= Angel in Disguise (Brandy song) =

Promotional single by Brandy

from the album Never Say Never
- Released: January 21, 1999
- Studio: Pacifique Recording Studios
- Genre: R&B
- Length: 4:48
- Label: Atlantic
- Songwriters: Rodney Jerkins; Fred Jerkins III; LaShawn Daniels; Traci Hale; Tye-V Turman
- Producers: Rodney Jerkins; Brandy

Audio video
- "Angel in Disguise" on YouTube

"Angel in Disguise" is a song recorded by American singer Brandy for her second studio album Never Say Never (1998). It was written by Rodney "Darkchild" Jerkins, Fred Jerkins III, LaShawn Daniels, Traci Hale, and Tye-V Turman, and was produced by Jerkins along with Brandy. The song was recorded and mixed by audio engineer Dave Way at the Pacifique Recording Studios in North Hollywood, California and features prominent backing vocals by singer Joe.

"Angel in Disguise" was well received by music critics. Billboard described it as "outstanding" and "spectacular" and said it would effectively shoot down all preconceived notions that Norwood only made bubblegum pop. The song was at one stage intended to be released as a single from Never Say Never but these plans did not materialize. It was instead released as a promo single on the North American music market on January 21, 1999.

The song peaked at number 72 on the US Billboard Hot 100. It became Brandy's first song to chart without an actual single release or a video. On the Hot R&B/Hip-Hop Songs chart the song peaked at number 17, becoming Brandy's 8th consecutive top-twenty song.

== Background and recording ==
"Angel in Disguise" was written by LaShawn Daniels, Fred Jerkins III, Rodney "Darkchild" Jerkins, Nycolia Turman, and Traci Haleett. It was produced by Rodney Jerkins and Norwood and recorded by Ken Deranteriasian and Victor McCoy at Pacifique Recording Studios in North Hollywood, California. Daniels arranged the background song of the song, which was recorded by Norwood. "Angel in Disguise" also has a background song performed by the American singer Joe which consists of a looped verse where he sings "And I love you baby".... but after Norwood heard the production and sampling with Joe, she wanted to make it a whole song. In an interview with Complex Magazine in 2012, she said: "'Angel in Disguise' is one of my absolute favorites. When I heard it, I said 'Oh my God. Are there really songs like this?' [...] At first it was only meant as an intro but I said 'Are you crazy, we have to make this a real song'."

== Composition and lyrics ==
"Angel in Disguise" is a slow-paced R&B song. It has a total playing time of four minutes and forty-eight seconds. It consists of a "dribbling bass line" that Chuck Taylor of Billboard compared to a "dreamlike, moonlit night". The harmonic background song, created using the so-called multi-track recording, was described as "enchanting" and "seductive". The lyrics of "Angel in Disguise" describe that the performer still loves her partner despite his infidelity. Norwood quoted: "An angel in disguise she was / But somehow you fell for her / Till she broke your heart that day / And left you in the rain / But still I love you".

== Release and critical reception ==
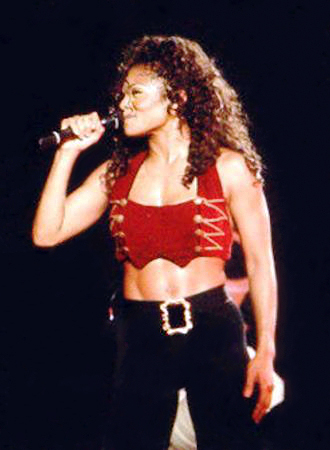
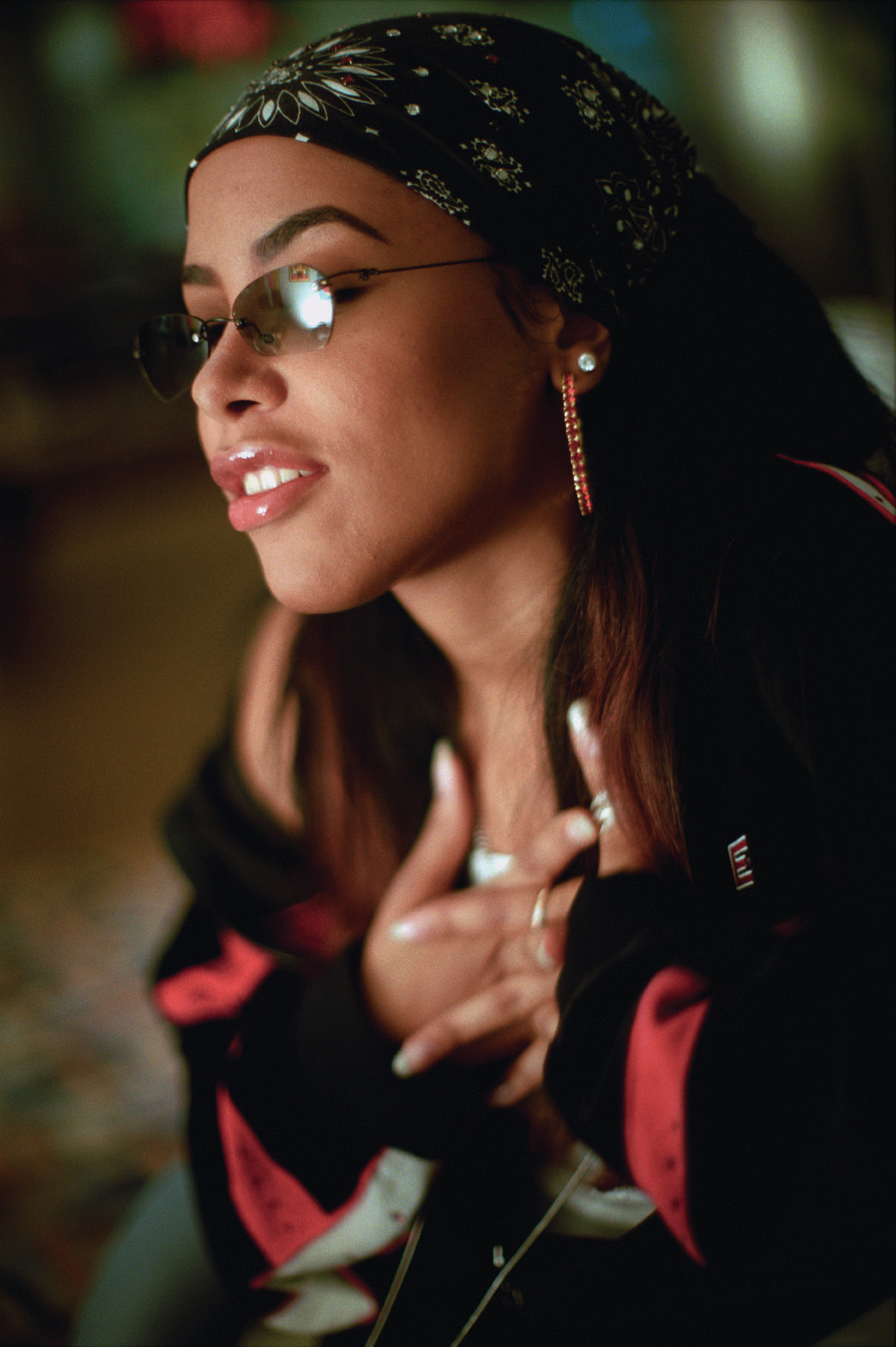
Music critics noted that "Angel in Disguise" was influenced by Janet Jackson (left) and compared it to Aaliyah's (right) "One in a Million" (1996).

In 1998, Never Say Never was certified triple platinum by the RIAA and sold three million copies in the United States. Her first two singles from the album were "The Boy Is Mine", a duet with Monica, and "Top of the World" with rapper Mase as the guest artist. Both of these songs were commercially successful and the former spent thirteen weeks at number one on the Billboard Hot 100. In early 1999, Atlantic Records planned to release "Angel in Disguise" as the third single from Never Say Never. The plans did not materialize when Atlantic considered the power ballad "Have You Ever?" was a safer card when it was written by the well-known lyricist Diane Warren and was already in great demand on the radio. "Angel in Disguise" was instead released as a promo single on January 21, 1999. The song was printed on 12" vinyl singles with the album mix, two acapella versions and an instrumental version.

"Angel in Disguise" was praised by music critics. Chuck Taylor of Billboard wrote that the song was a "spectacular and funky mid-tempo production that borrows ingredients from Janet Jackson's creative pantry." He said the song would effectively shoot down any preconceived notion that Norwood was just bubblegum pop and continued: "This is the kind of song that attacks as soon as it comes out of the speakers and is one of the most unique and provocative songs to date of this teenage sensation." Thomas Inskeep at Stylus Magazine described "Angel in Disguise" as "ridiculously good" and then went on to say: "It's definitely one of my Brandy favorites and a classic Darkchild production. In five, six years, some great, successful artist will, with great certainty, "Hopefully the song can then have a chance to be as big as it deserves to be." Daryl Easlea, writer for the British website BBC Music, was positive about Never Say Never as a whole and wrote that "Angel in Disguise" was "loaded with emotion" thanks to her gospel-trained voices. Aamir Yaqub from the British website Soul Culturewrote that Norwood's voice for the most part sounded restrained. He wrote: "The lyrics speak of betrayal and the pain that Brandy feels when her fears come true. Brandy emphasizes passion and longing with her artificial song that is instantly recognizable."

A writer at Epinions compared the song's drum production to Aaliyah's "One in a Million", written and produced by Timbaland. The writer continued his review by writing: "The album begins with tasteful 'Angel in Disguise' which has a touch of adult sensuality. It feels familiar as it has the same beat that made Timbaland famous a few years ago." The Spokesman wrote: "Brandy is obviously not Moesha but she lets a bit of that innocent character be heard on her record. Her young age and hence confusion towards love shines through on 'U Don't Know Me (Like U Used To)', the funky 'Happy' and 'Angel in Disguise'."

== Commercial performance ==
"Angel in Disguise" was released during the period when Norwood's popularity was at its peak. Without any music video or marketing of Atlantic, the song became a success on American radio. By November 21, 1998, several months before the song's official release date, it had reached a radio audience of over 22 million listeners. It reached tenth place on 28 November 1998, which became its top position on the list. The song entered Hot R&B/Hip-Hop Songs on January 23, 1999, where it peaked at number 17, becoming Norwood's eighth consecutive top 20 entry. The song was ranked nineteenth in the Top 20 Jet Songs by Jet Magazine.

== Track listings ==
US 12" singles
No.	Title	Length
1.	"Angel in Disguise" (Album Mix)	4:48
2.	"Angel in Disguise" (Percapella)	n/a
3.	"Angel in Disguise" (Instrumental)	n/a
4.	"Angel in Disguise" (Acapella)	n/a

== Credits and personnel ==
Credits adapted from the liner notes of Never Say Never.

- Brandy – vocals, background vocals, producer
- Joe – backing vocal
- LaShawn Daniels – songwriter, singer arranger
- Fred Jerkins III – songwriter
- Rodney "Darkchild" Jerkins – songwriter, producer
- Brian Gardner – mastering
- Nycolia Turman – songwriter
- Traci Haleett – songwriter
- Dave Way – mixing
- Brian Young – engineering
- Ken Deranteriasian – engineering

== Charts ==
=== Weekly charts ===
Chart (1999)	Peak position
US Billboard Hot 100	72
US Hot R&B/Hip-Hop Songs (Billboard)	17
US Rhythmic Airplay (Billboard)	32

=== Year-end charts ===
Chart (1999)	Position
US Hot R&B/Hip-Hop Songs (Billboard)	96
