= Almost Doesn't Count =

1999 single by Brandy

Single by Brandy

from the album Never Say Never
- Released: March 23, 1999
- Studio: Banana Boat (Burbank, California); Pacifique (North Hollywood, California)
- Genre: Pop; R&B
- Length: 3:37
- Label: Atlantic
- Songwriters: Shelly Peiken; Guy Roche
- Producers: Fred Jerkins III; Guy Roche

Brandy singles chronology
"Have You Ever?" (1998)	"Almost Doesn't Count" (1999)	"U Don't Know Me" (1999)

Music video
- "Almost Doesn't Count" on YouTube

"Almost Doesn't Count" is a song by American singer Brandy Norwood. It was written by Shelly Peiken and Guy Roche and recorded by Norwood for her second studio album, Never Say Never (1998). Atlantic Records consulted Fred Jerkins III to recut the song to be more consistent with the overall sound of the album. He would subsequently share production credit along with Roche. A pop and R&B-ballad combining elements of country, it incorporates Latin flavored riffs. The song's lyrics are based on an on-again, off-again relationship that Peiken had experienced during her college years.

The song was released as the fourth overall single from Never Say Never on March 23, 1999. "Almost Doesn't Count" received a positive response from most music critics, who called it one of the album highlights, with major praise for Norwood's vocal performance. A commercial success, "Almost Doesn't Count" hit the top twenty in New Zealand, the United Kingdom, and on the US Billboard Hot 100. It earned Norwood her third Best Female R&B Vocal Performance nomination at the 42nd Annual Grammy Awards and was awarded a BMI Pop Award in 2000.

The accompanying music video for "Almost Doesn't Count," filmed by Kevin Bray in the Lancaster area, depicts Norwood as an unnoticed wedding guest in the backyard of an expressway hotel, following the breakdown of her car in the Mojave Desert. Norwood performed the song in the 1999 made-for-television musical drama film Double Platinum, directed by Robert Allan Ackerman, and starring Diana Ross and herself. She included the song in the set-list of various live shows and future tours, including the Never Say Never World Tour, the Human World Tour and the Slayana World Tour.

== Background ==
"Almost Doesn't Count" was written by Shelly Peiken and Guy Roche. Inspired by a powerful but unfruitful on-again, off-again relationship she had with a man in her college years, Peiken recalled her emotions during a writing session with Roche decades later when she "dug up that laundry list of all the 'almosts' I felt we had, and we put it into the song." In a 2020 interview, she further elaborated about the lyrics: "It was a relationship that was more in my head than in his, and I always felt like we almost got there, he almost said I love you, he almost broke up with the girlfriend he had the whole time. He almost faced his feelings but he never quite got there – maybe that was all in my head too. Maybe he never had any of those feelings, maybe it was all my imagination."

Written in the thirty-two-bar form structure, which the pair considered "very sort of country," Peiken and Roche put the song on the back burner since they were not sure how to finish it, feeling undecided about the genre that they were looking for in the song. They resumed work on "Almost Doesn't Count" a few months later when, according to Peiken, "it was a lot clearer – not so much the genre, but that it was good enough that we couldn't leave it on the back burner – it was really good and we had to finish it. So we did, and then we sent it around." Picked up by Atlantic Records, the demo, produced by Roche, was eventually polished by producer Fred Jerkins III for Norwood's second album Never Say Never (1998). Recording took place at Banana Boat Studios in Burbank and at Pacifique Recording Studios in North Hollywood, California, with Peiken providing backing vocals. In 2019, Roche ranked the song among his favorite productions.

== Critical reception ==
In his review of parent album Never Say Never, Shaheen Chughtai, editor for The Daily Star Lebanon, wrote that "Brandy does have a fine voice, drenched in sex-appeal, and in good form on tracks like 'Almost Doesn’t Count'." San Francisco Chronicle's Lee Hildebrand described the song as "haunting" and added: "Brandy takes her time with the ballad, wrapping her warm, melismatic alto pipes around their melodic contours with womanly nuance." Stephen Thomas Erlewine from Allmusic cited the song one of the album's highlights along with "The Boy Is Mine" and "Have You Ever?." Billboard editor Chuck Taylor wrote that "breezy, sensual, straightforward, and drenched with those gorgeous harmonies that are recognizable in an instant, Miss Norwood serves up a tasty slow jam about letting go of love. While the single is a certain bull's-eye at mainstream R&B radio – where it'll first be worked – top 40 will undoubtedly be waiting in the wings, licking its chops."

Less impressed, Lorraine Ali from Rolling Stone declared "the Spanish guitar and chimes in "Almost Doesn't Count [...] the cheesiest moment" on Never Say Never. Her colleague Rob Sheffield ranked the song 67th on his The 98 Best Songs of 1998 listing for Rolling Stone and called it a "a doleful weeper where Ms. Norwood comes close to true love – but alas, not close enough – over a flourish of Latin acoustic guitar." Music Week labeled the song a "smoochy ballad" with "its typically Smooth production, Spanish guitars, Lazy groove and Brandy's breathy vocals." The publication also felt that it could be commercial success like her previously released singles from the same album. The Village Voice ranked "Almost Doesn't Count" 16th on its Pazz & Jop 1998 Singles listing. In 2020, Lela Olds from Vibe, ranked the song eighth on his Brandy's 15 Best Songs listing. One of the most-performed songs of the year, "Almost Doesn't Count" was honored with BMI Citations of Achievement at the BMI Pop Awards in 2000. In addition, the song earned Norwood her third nomination in the Best Female R&B Vocal Performance category at the 42nd Annual Grammy Awards, though she lost to Whitney Houston's "It's Not Right but It's Okay."

== Music video ==
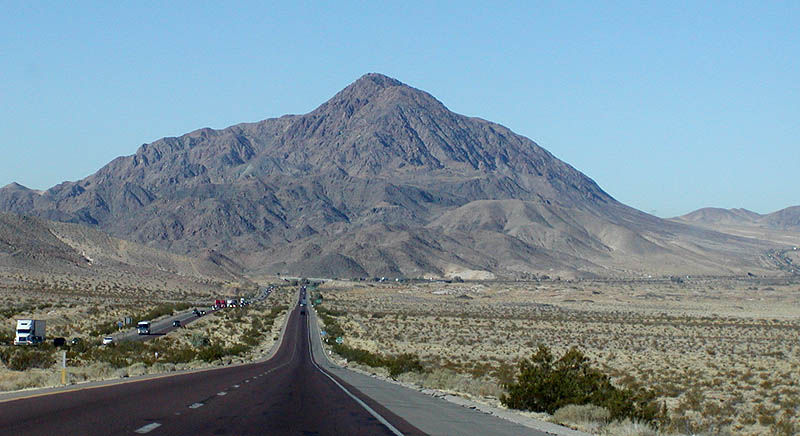
The video for "Almost Doesn't Count" was filmed in the Mojave Desert in California.

A music video for "Almost Doesn't Count" was directed by Kevin Bray in April 1999. It marked his second collaboration with Norwood following their work on the video for "Have You Ever?" (1998). Filmed in Lancaster, California and the surrounding Mojave Desert, it depicts Norwood as a wedding guest and singer whose oldtimer suffers from a breakdown prior to the wedding ceremony in the evening. After a walk of several miles, a pick up drives by and she climbs inside the back where a fellow passenger gives her his cowboy hat. At night, they drop her off at a gas station which Norwood finds closed, prompting her to check into a nearby hotel off the expressway. In the hotel room, she unpacks and changes her outfit when she, out from the window, watches a couple getting married in the courtyard across the street. The video ends with Norwood crashing the celebration, unnoticed, before joining the band who play to an empty courtyard.

== Track listings ==
Australian CD single
No.	Title	Writer(s)	Producer(s)	Length
1.	"Almost Doesn't Count" (Radio Remix)	Shelly Peiken; Guy Roche	Fred Jerkins III; Roche; Pull^{[a]}	3:37
2.	"Almost Doesn't Count" (Album Version)	Peiken; Roche	Jerkins; Roche	3:39
3.	"Almost Doesn't Count" (Pull Club Radio Edit)	Peiken; Roche	Jerkins; Roche; Pull^{[a]}	4:15
4.	"Almost Doesn't Count" (DJ Premier Remix)	Peiken; Roche	Jerkins; Roche; DJ Premier^{[a]}	3:47
5.	"Almost Doesn't Count" (Pull Club Extended Mix)	Peiken; Roche	Jerkins; Roche; Pull^{[a]}	8:21

Japan CD single
No.	Title	Writer(s)	Producer(s)	Length
1.	"Almost Doesn't Count" (Album Version)	Peiken; Roche	Jerkins; Roche	3:39
2.	"Have You Ever?" (Soul Skank Remix)	Diane Warren	David Foster; Soul Inside Productions 98^{[a]}	5:40
3.	"The Boy Is Mine" (duet with Monica) (Club Remix)	LaShawn Daniels; Rodney Jerkins; Fred Jerkins III; Japhe Tejeda; Brandy Norwood	Darkchild; Brandy; Dallas Austin^{[a]}	7:42
4.	"Almost Doesn't Count" (DJ Premier Remix)	Peiken; Roche	Jerkins; Roche; DJ Premier^{[a]}	3:47
5.	"Almost Doesn't Count" (Club Remix)	Peiken; Roche	Jerkins; Roche; Pull^{[a]}	4:37

UK CD single I
No.	Title	Writer(s)	Producer(s)	Length
1.	"Almost Doesn't Count" (Radio Remix)	Peiken; Roche	Jerkins; Roche; Pull^{[a]}	3:37
2.	"Almost Doesn't Count" (Album Version)	Peiken; Roche	Jerkins; Roche	3:39
3.	"Almost Doesn't Count" (DJ Premier Remix)	Peiken; Roche	Jerkins; Roche; DJ Premier^{[a]}	3:47

UK CD single II
No.	Title	Writer(s)	Producer(s)	Length
1.	"Almost Doesn't Count" (Pull Club Radio Edit)	Peiken; Roche	Jerkins; Roche; Pull^{[a]}	4:15
2.	"Almost Doesn't Count" (Club Remix)	Peiken; Roche	Jerkins; Roche; Pull^{[a]}	4:37
3.	"Have You Ever?" (Soul Skank Remix)	Warren	Foster; Soul Inside Productions 98^{[a]}	5:40

Notes

- ^{^a} denotes additional producer

== Personnel ==
Personnel are lifted from the album's liner notes.

- Anas Allaf – guitar
- Gerry Brown – mixing
- Fred Jerkins III – engineering, mixing, production
- Mario Luccy – engineering
- Brandy Norwood – vocals
- Shelly Peiken – background vocals, writing
- Moana Suchard – engineering
- Guy Roche – production, writing

== Charts ==
=== Weekly charts ===
Chart (1999)	Peak position
Canada Top Singles (RPM)	34
Canada Adult Contemporary (RPM)	24
Canada CHR/Top 40 (BDS)	27
Europe (European Hot 100 Singles)	61
Germany (GfK)	88
New Zealand (Recorded Music NZ)	13
Scottish Singles Sales (Official Charts)	40
UK Singles (Official Charts)	15
UK Hip Hop/R&B (Official Charts)	2
US Billboard Hot 100	16
US Hot R&B/Hip-Hop Songs (Billboard)	16
US Pop Airplay (Billboard)	15
US Rhythmic Airplay (Billboard)	8

=== Year-end charts ===
Chart (1999)	Position
US Billboard Hot 100	76
US Hot R&B/Hip-Hop Singles & Tracks (Billboard)	73
US Mainstream Top 40 (Billboard)	59
US Rhythmic Top 40 (Billboard)	36

== Release history ==
Region	Date	Format(s)	Label(s)	Ref.
United States	March 23, 1999	Rhythmic contemporary; urban radio	Atlantic	
United States	April 13, 1999	Contemporary hit radio	Atlantic	
United Kingdom	June 7, 1999	CD; cassette	Atlantic	
Japan	June 9, 1999	CD	Atlantic	

== Mark Wills version ==
"Almost Doesn't Count"

Single by Mark Wills

from the album Permanently
- B-side: "Permanently"
- Released: April 3, 2000
- Genre: Country
- Length: 3:37
- Label: Mercury Nashville
- Songwriters: Shelly Peiken; Guy Roche
- Producer: Carson Chamberlain

Mark Wills singles chronology
"Back at One" (1999)	"Almost Doesn't Count" (2000)	"I Want to Know (Everything There Is to Know About You)" (2000)

In April 2000, American country music artist Mark Wills released a cover of the song as the second single from his third studio album, Permanently. His version reached number 19 on the Billboard Hot Country Singles & Tracks chart. Wills' cover marked his second R&B cover following his late-1999 cover of Brian McKnight's "Back at One". An accompanying music video was directed by Michael Salomon and premiered in March 2000. It was filmed in Atlanta, Georgia. There are two different videos, both with the same concept but with different scenes.

=== Charts ===
==== Weekly charts ====
Chart (2000)	Peak position
US Hot Country Songs (Billboard)	19

==== Year-end charts ====
Chart (2000)	Position
US Hot Country Singles & Tracks (Billboard)	72

== Other cover versions ==
- In 2007, the song was sampled by Ali & Gipp in the single "Almost Made Ya," featuring vocals by LeToya Luckett and production by Jermaine Dupri.
- In 2023, singer Alex Vaughn covered "Almost Doesn't Count" as part of Spotify's Black Music Month. Her version was produced by Bryan-Michael Cox.
