= Top of the World (Brandy song) =

1998 single by Brandy

Single by Brandy featuring Mase

from the album Never Say Never
- Released: July 7, 1998
- Studio: Pacifique (North Hollywood, California)
- Genre: R&B; pop; funk
- Length: 4:41
- Label: Atlantic
- Songwriters: LaShawn Daniels; Fred Jerkins III; Rodney Jerkins; Isaac Phillips; Nycolia Turman; Mason Betha
- Producers: Rodney Jerkins; Brandy

Brandy singles chronology
"The Boy Is Mine" (1998)	"Top of the World" (1998)	"Have You Ever?" (1998)

Mase singles chronology
"Lookin' at Me" (1998)	"Top of the World" (1998)	"Take Me There" (1998)

Music video
- "Top of the World" on YouTube

"Top of the World" is a song by American singer and actress Brandy Norwood, from her second studio album, Never Say Never (1998). The song was written by Rodney "Darkchild" Jerkins, Fred Jerkins III, LaShawn Daniels, Isaac Phillips, Nycolia "Tye-V" Turman, and Mason Betha, with Darkchild and Norwood producing and Mase having featured vocals. Released as the album's second international single in July 1998, by Atlantic Records, the track peaked at number two on the UK Singles Chart and reached the top 20 in Iceland, Ireland, and New Zealand.

The music video for "Top of the World" was directed by Paul Hunter in June 1998 and became a huge success on the music video channels, BET and MTV. In the video, Norwood floats in the air where she does somersaults and other gymnastic movements.

== Critical reception ==
Larry Flick from Billboard magazine felt the song was a fitting follow up to "The Boy is Mine" and that Brandy now "proves that she has the chops to take on the most seasoned champs of R&B and pop". He also praised the lyrics and production, saying "the smart lyrics are couched in chunky funk beats and smooth guitar/keyboard interplay. Music Week described the song as "another slick piece of Rodney Jerkins (Boy Is Mine) R&B" and felt that "the best bits comes from Mase".

== Chart performance ==
"Top of the World" topped the UK R&B Singles Chart for six weeks and reached number two on the UK Singles Chart. The song became the second consecutive European success for Brandy and peaked at number 20 on the Eurochart Hot 100. "Top of the World" also charted at number 11 on the New Zealand Singles Chart and 21 on the Canadian RPM Top Singles chart. In the United States, it was a modest hit on the Billboard charts, peaking at number 44 on the Hot 100 Airplay chart, number 19 on the Hot R&B Singles chart, and number 10 on the Rhythmic Top 40 chart.

== Music video ==
A music video for "Top of the World" was directed by American director Paul Hunter and filmed in June 1998. A surrealistic clip built on digital effects, it features Norwood floating in the air, flipping and somersaulting above various objects such as telephone poles and vehicles—as passersby stopped to stare—and balancing vertically and horizontally alongside skyscrapers and other buildings.

== Remix ==
A remix version with Latin rappers Fat Joe and Big Pun appeared on Pun's 2001 compilation album Endangered Species. The Darkchild-produced song was previously released on the remix EP U Don't Know Me (Like U Used To) - The Remix EP (1999). The remix samples Ahmad's single "Back in the Day."

== Live performances ==
She performed the song live at the MTV Movie Awards and the remix version with Big Pun and Fat Joe at the Soul Train Awards which aired in 1999. Norwood performed the song on her first world tour Never Say Never World Tour (1998-1999), the TV special Brandy in Concert: A Special for the Holidays (1999) and on her second world tour, Human World Tour (2009) where it was part of a "1990s medley".

== Samples ==
On 1 June 2023, Nigerian singer Burna Boy released the single "Sittin' On Top Of The World" featuring Atlanta rapper 21 Savage, which heavily samples "Top of the World". It earned a nomination for Best Melodic Rap Performance at the 66th Annual Grammy Awards.

== Track listings ==
Australian CD single
No.	Title	Writer(s)	Producer(s)	Length
1.	"Top of the World" (No Rap Edit)	LaShawn Daniels; Fred Jerkins III; Rodney Jerkins; Isaac Phillips; Nycolia Turman; Mason Betha	Darkchild; Brandy^{[a]}	3:32
2.	"Top of the World" (Edit featuring Mase)	Daniels; F. Jerkins; R. Jerkins; Phillips; Turman; Betha	Darkchild; Brandy^{[a]}	4:11
3.	"Top of the World" (LP Version)	Daniels; F. Jerkins; R. Jerkins; Phillips; Turman; Betha	Darkchild; Brandy^{[a]}	4:41
4.	"Top of the World" (Boogiesoul Remix Radio Edit)	Daniels; F. Jerkins; R. Jerkins; Phillips; Turman; Betha	Darkchild; Brandy^{[a]}; Boogiemann^{[a]}	4:16
5.	"The Boy Is Mine" (Radio Edit With Intro; duet with Monica)	Daniels; R. Jerkins; F. Jerkins; Japhe Tejeda; Brandy Norwood	Darkchild; Dallas Austin; Brandy	4:00

UK Part I CD single
No.	Title	Writer(s)	Producer(s)	Length
1.	"Top of the World" (Edit featuring Mase)	Daniels; F. Jerkins; R. Jerkins; Phillips; Turman; Betha	Darkchild; Brandy^{[a]}	4:11
2.	"Top of the World" (No Rap Edit)	Daniels; F. Jerkins; R. Jerkins; Phillips; Turman; Betha	Darkchild; Brandy^{[a]}	3:32
3.	"Top of the World" (Instrumental)	Daniels; F. Jerkins; R. Jerkins; Phillips; Turman; Betha	Darkchild; Brandy^{[a]}	4:41

Remix single
No.	Title	Writer(s)	Producer(s)	Length
1.	"Top of the World" (Edit featuring Mase)	Daniels; F. Jerkins; R. Jerkins; Phillips; Turman; Betha	Darkchild; Brandy^{[a]}	4:11
2.	"Top of the World" (Boogiesoul Remix Radio Edit)	Daniels; F. Jerkins; R. Jerkins; Phillips; Turman; Betha	Darkchild; Brandy^{[a]}; Boogiemann^{[a]}	4:16
3.	"Top of the World" (Part II featuring Fat Joe & Big Pun)	Daniels; F. Jerkins; R. Jerkins; Phillips; Turman; Betha; Ahmad Lewis; Christopher Rios; Stephan Gordy; Joseph Cartagena	Darkchild	4:07

Notes

- ^{^a} denotes additional producer

Sample credits

- "Top of the World (Part II)" samples "Back in the Day" (1994) by Ahmad, written by Ahmad Lewis and Stephan Gordy.

== Personnel ==
Personnel are adapted from the liner notes of Never Say Never.

- Mason Betha — vocals, writing
- LaShawn Daniels — vocal production, recording, writing
- Brian Gardner — mastering
- Jean-Marie Horvat — recording
- Fred Jerkins III — writing
- Rodney Jerkins — production, instruments, mixing, recording, writing
- Brandy Norwood — additional production, vocals, writing
- Isaac Phillips — recording
- Rick Sigel — recording
- Dexter Simmons — mixing
- Nycolia "Tye-V" Turman — writing
- Brian Young — assistant engineer

== Charts ==
=== Weekly charts ===
Chart (1998)	Peak position
Australia (ARIA)	39
Canada (Nielsen SoundScan)	21
Canada CHR/Top 40 (BDS)	27
Canada Top Singles (RPM)	22
Canada Dance (RPM)	1
Canada Urban (RPM)	1
Europe (European Hot 100 Singles)	20
France (SNEP)	39
Germany (GfK)	42
Iceland (Íslenski Listinn Topp 40)	3
Ireland (IRMA)	18
Netherlands (Dutch Top 40 Tipparade)	5
Netherlands (Single Top 100)	52
New Zealand (Recorded Music NZ)	11
Scottish Singles Sales (Official Charts)	17
Sweden (Sverigetopplistan)	52
Switzerland (Schweizer Hitparade)	42
UK Singles (Official Charts)	2
UK Hip Hop/R&B (Official Charts)	1
US Radio Songs (Billboard)	44
US R&B/Hip-Hop Airplay (Billboard)	4
US Rhythmic Airplay (Billboard)	10

=== Year-end charts ===
Chart (1998)	Position
Canada Top Singles (RPM)	81
Canada Urban (RPM)	7
UK Singles (OCC)	107
UK Urban (Music Week)	23
US Rhythmic Top 40 (Billboard)	43

== Certifications ==
Region	Certification	Certified units/sales
United Kingdom (BPI)	Silver	200,000^{^}
^{^} Shipments figures based on certification alone.

== Release history ==
List of release dates, showing region, release format, and label
Region	Date	Format(s)	Label	Ref.
United States	July 7, 1998	Rhythmic contemporary radio; urban contemporary radio	Atlantic	
Japan	September 5, 1998	CD	Atlantic	
United Kingdom	September 28, 1998	12-inch vinyl; CD; cassette	Atlantic	
Canada	October 27, 1998	CD	Atlantic	
