= Have You Ever? =

1998 single by Brandy

Single by Brandy

from the album Never Say Never
- B-side: "Happy"
- Released: October 6, 1998
- Studio: Chartmaker (Malibu, California); Record Plant (Hollywood, California)
- Genre: Pop
- Length: 4:33 (album version); 3:33 (radio edit)
- Label: Atlantic
- Songwriter: Diane Warren
- Producer: David Foster

Brandy singles chronology
| "Top of the World" (1998) | "Have You Ever?" (1998) | "Almost Doesn't Count" (1999) |

Music video
- "Have You Ever?" on YouTube

"Have You Ever?" is a song by American recording artist Brandy for her second studio album, Never Say Never (1998). The song was written by Diane Warren, while production was handled by David Foster. It was released as the album's third single by Atlantic Records in October 1998. The song became Brandy's second song to reach the top position on the US Billboard Hot 100, following "The Boy Is Mine". "Have You Ever?" further reached number one in New Zealand, number two in Iceland, number eight in Australia, and the top 30 in Canada, Ireland, and the United Kingdom.

The song's music video, directed by Kevin Bray, depicts Brandy looking after the empty house of her best friend, whom she is secretly in love with, waiting for his return while she watches the videos of the two of them. At the 1999 MTV Video Music Awards, the video was nominated for Best R&B Video, but eventually lost to Lauryn Hill's "Doo Wop (That Thing)". The visual was a great success on the music video channels BET and MTV, where it reached fourth and third place, respectively. Following the release of the song, Brandy performed it on several televised programs, including the American Music Awards of 1999, The Tonight Show with Jay Leno and VH1 Divas 1999. After the release, "Have You Ever?" was later included frequently on the setlists for the singer's concerts and tours, including the Never Say Never World Tour and the Human World Tour.

== Background and recording ==
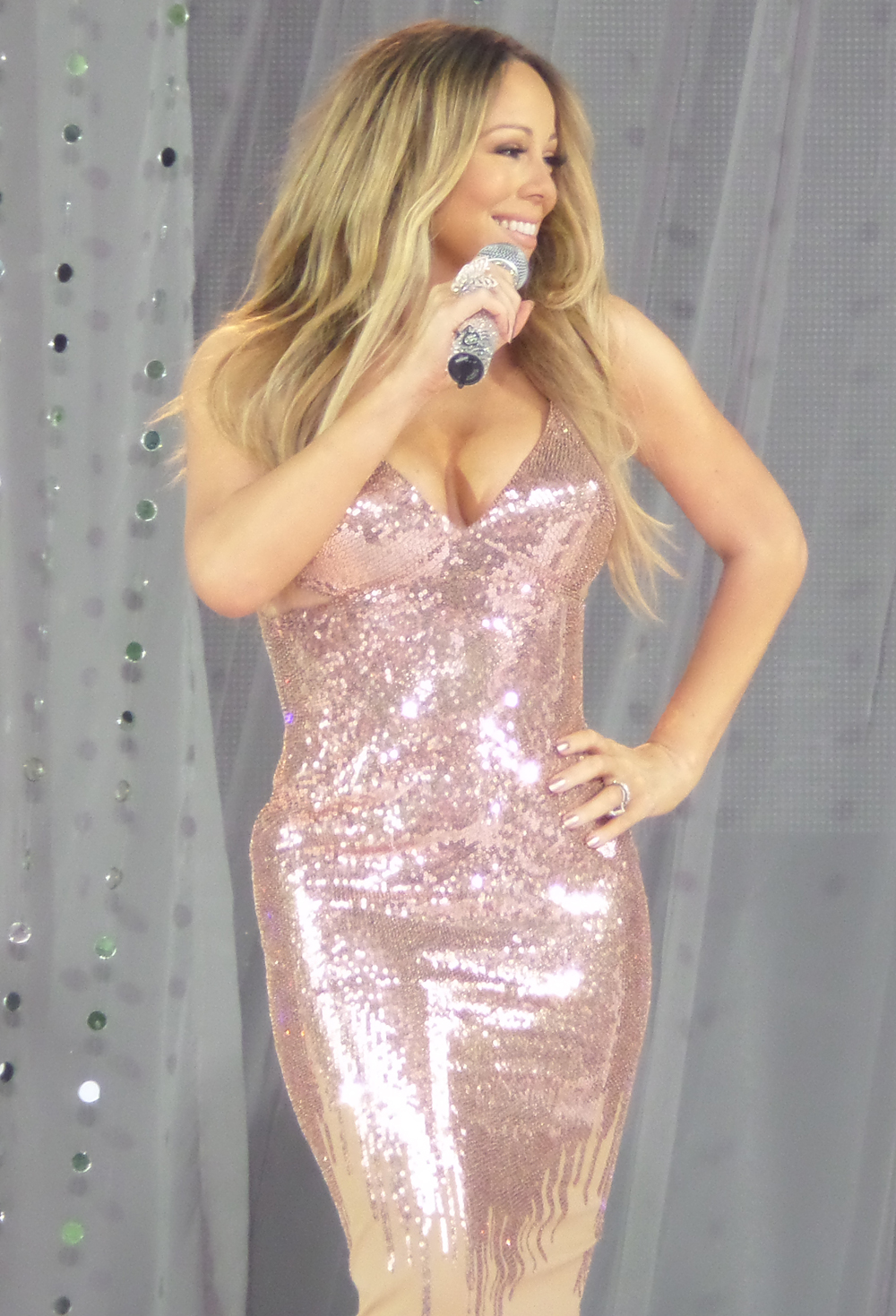
Mariah Carey (pictured in 2013) inspired Brandy to create more adult material for Never Say Never.

In 1997, Brandy began work on her second studio album Never Say Never, which served as a sequel to her platinum-selling self-titled debut album (1994). For Never Say Never, Brandy chose to work with other music producers, as she wanted to create more adult material, being partly inspired by her idols, Whitney Houston and Mariah Carey. She had greater creative control than on the previous album and became one of the lead producers for the project.

"Have You Ever?" was written by Diane Warren, and while produced by David Foster. While Brandy had worked with a wide range of different producers on previous tracks for her debut album and several soundtrack contributions, the recording of the song marked the first time she "had been in the studio with a producer like David Foster", Brandy stated in a 2005 interview. "My voice wasn't as developed as it is now and the song required what producers call 'money notes' — the kind that get you a No. 1 on the charts! I was nervous but it all worked just fine." On September 5, 2012, Warren revealed in an interview that she considers the track "a classic song. She sang it amazingly. I'm still waiting for the country version. "Have You Ever?" was recorded at Chartmaker Studios in Malibu, California and The Record Plant in Hollywood, California.

Prior to the collaboration with Brandy, Foster listened to her previous music and especially focused on "Sittin' Up in My Room" from 1995. He was inspired by the background singing of the song and wanted to find the person who created it. "I liked those background vocals. I wanted to get the same person to do them on our song, so I asked who it was and I found out it was all Brandy. I couldn't believe it!" Foster continued: "I have to say, I have never worked with anyone who can do backgrounds so easily." Brandy had arranged and recorded the background vocals for "Have You Ever" in less than two hours.

In 2005, when "Have You Ever?" was included on her first compilation album The Best of Brandy, Brandy recounted the recording of the song: "It was the first time I was in a recording studio with David Foster. In an interview with Complex, she elaborated on the recording process: "It did not take so many shots but they definitely took over a few times to have some to choose from. But again, I admired these people so immensely. I think it helped me, because I wanted to do well. "I wanted to impress them. So I tried everything possible. I was not afraid to be ashamed, I have never been. Sometimes my voice broke and I missed tones but I tried."

== Composition and lyrics ==
"Have You Ever?"
30-second chorus of "Have You Ever?"

According to the sheet music published at Musicnotes.com, the song is set in the time signature of common time and has a tempo of 72 beats per minute. The song was written in the key of A major, and Brandy's voice ranges from the tone of F_{3} and D_{5}. Tom Breihan of Stereogum found Foster's production on the track sparse compared with his established style, suggesting that the producer "had evidently absorbed at least a little bit of the spaciousness that was coming to define commercial R&B". According to Rolanje D. Armstead of the TimesDaily, it has a "low-pitched, beat-based tune" consisting of keyboards and guitars.

The song opens with an a cappella rendition of what is later revealed to be its chorus. Music journalist, Chuck Taylor from Billboard considered "Have You Ever?" to be Brandy's "restrained song," which has a "searching and abandoned texture" that makes the listener understand she "draws emotions far from within herself.In the song's lyrics, Brandy sings about unrequited love with lyrics such as "Have you finally found the one you've given your heart to / Only to find that one will not give their heart to you.".

== Release and critical reception ==
The song was met generally positive reviews from music critics. In his single review for Billboard, journalist Chuck Taylor noted that it is hard "to imagine this single as anything but another jewel in the pop and Contemporary R&B princess' crown." He called the song's melody "instantly gratifying, with a harmony-soaked hook that's dedicated to memory after just a couple listens," and concluded that "Have You Ever?" is "a prime example of how, in the course of just a few short years, Brandy has proved to be one of the most versatile and promising stars on the fast real track to superstar royalty." Richard Harrington of The Spokesman-Review called the song a "luxurious [...] inevitable Diane Warren-penned power ballad," which was "begging to be redone as a duet, perhaps with Usher?"

In a generally negative review of Never Say Never, Angela Lewis of The Independent found that Brandy's "voice is pure honey, but she lacks real command of tracks like 'Have You Ever?', showing she's better at playing by the rules than anything else." Daryl Easlea of BBC Music wrote that [w]orking with session players the calibre of bassist Nathan East and David Foster on keyboards, Never Say Never was aimed at the widest audience possible. This was most evident on 'Have You Ever?'. She elaborated, writing that "the ballad sounds a little too formulaic and off-the-peg, aimed for the summit of the hit parade". Music Week called "Have You Ever?" a highlight from the album and felt that it was bound to achieve the same success as her previous singles. Grant Rindner of Oprah Magazine called that song is "slowburning and soulful throwback" and Brandy's voice sing in a "complex and knotted harmony."

== Commercial performance ==
"Have You Ever?" debuted on the UK Singles Chart, at number 13 on the chart dated December 12, 1998. On January 9, 1999, Fred Bronson of Billboard announced that the commercial release had made the single climb from ninth to third place on the Billboard Hot 100 list with sales of 250,000 copies. The song eventually reached the top position on the Billboard Hot 100 following the worldwide number-one success of "The Boy Is Mine". In the week of January 16, 1999, "Have You Ever?" reach the top 5 on Billboard

The song also reached number one in New Zealand, peaked within the top ten in Australia, and managed to reach the top 30 in Canada and the United Kingdom and the top 30 in Ireland.

== Music video ==
A scene of the music video showing Brandy dressed in a man's suit.

An accompanying music video was filmed by director Kevin Bray who in Los Angeles, California during the week of October 31, 1998. In the clip, Brandy looks after her best friend's empty house, waiting for his return while she watches videos of the two of them in the bedroom. In the first sequences of the video, Brandy drives into the driveway to the house and remains in the car as she gives up before the song's first verses. In other scenes, a video plays that sees Brandy hanging out with her love interest. The sequences alternate between scenes showing her in front of a pool, wearing the man's jacket. Brandy sits in his living room, walks around his closet, and dresses in his suit. Towards the end of the video, she sings to the man from a TV screen and performs the climax of the song in different clothes and in different places in the house. The music video became a success on America's largest music video channels. The video was sent to MTV and VH1 on October 10, 1998, and to BET the following week. The visual entered at number 21 on BET's Video Top List that was released towards the weekend of October 24, 1998. The following week, "Have You Ever?" also on MTV in place 13. It reached the top ten on the list in early November 1998. On December 5, 1998, the video reached the third place on the list, which became its top position. "Have You Ever?" finally reached number four on BET's list on December 19, 1998, and number 14 on VH1's list on May 1, 1999. At the MTV Video Music Awards, held September 9, 1999, at the Metropolitan Opera House in New York, the song nominated in the category of Best R&B Video. However, it lost the award to Lauryn Hill's Doo Wop (That Thing).

== Live performances ==
Brandy performed the song on several televised shows in the United States. On January 11, 1999, she hosted the American Music Awards of 1999, where she was also nominated in two categories. During that evening, she performed "Have You Ever?" in a gold-colored evening dress while accompanied by an orchestra. Brandy also performed the song on the American talk show The Tonight Show with Jay Leno. On April 13, 1999, the American gala, Divas Live '99 aired, where she performed three songs from Never Say Never in a white evening gown. "Have You Ever?" was the opening number which after a few minutes turned into "Almost Doesn't Count" and then "(Everything I Do) I Do It for You". The performance was seen by over nine million Americans and received a positive response from Jet magazine which described her performance of the song as "enchanting." The track was later included on the DVD of the same name. On May 16, 1999, Brandy performed the song in the TV movie Double Platinum, in which she played the lead role as the singer Kayla, daughter of the superstar Olivia King, played by Diana Ross. Since the release of "Have You Ever?," the song has often been included on the setlists for Brandy's concerts and tours, including the TV special, Brandy in Concert: A Special for the Holidays, which aired on UPN on November 20, 1999, and her two world tours Never Say Never World Tour and the Human World Tour.

== Track listings ==
US CD, 7-inch, and cassette single
| No. | Title | Length |
|---|---|---|
| 1. | "Have You Ever?" (single edit) | 3:32 |
| 2. | "Top of the World" (remix single edit featuring Fat Joe and Big Pun) | 4:07 |

UK CD and cassette single
| No. | Title | Length |
|---|---|---|
| 1. | "Have You Ever?" (radio edit) | 4:10 |
| 2. | "Happy" | 4:06 |
| 3. | "Have You Ever?" (LP version) | 4:31 |

European CD single
| No. | Title | Length |
|---|---|---|
| 1. | "Have You Ever?" (radio edit) | 4:10 |
| 2. | "Have You Ever?" (album version) | 4:36 |

Australian and Japanese CD single
| No. | Title | Length |
|---|---|---|
| 1. | "Have You Ever?" (radio edit) | 3:33 |
| 2. | "Have You Ever?" (album version) | 4:31 |
| 3. | "Top of the World" (Boogie Soul remix featuring Mase) | 4:43 |
| 4. | "Top of the World (Part II)" (club mix featuring Fat Joe and Big Pun) | 5:15 |

== Credits and personnel ==
Credits are adapted from the liner notes of Never Say Never.

- Brandy – vocals, background vocals
- Diane Warren – writing
- David Foster – production, arrangement, keyboards
- Felipe Elgueta – sound engineering
- Mick Guzauski – sound mixing
- Tom Bender – assistant sound mixing
- Simon Franglen – Synclavier programming
- Michael Thompson – guitar

== Charts ==
=== Weekly charts ===
Weekly chart performance for "Have You Ever?"
| Chart (1998–1999) | Peak position |
|---|---|
| Australia (ARIA) | 8 |
| Belgium (Ultratip Bubbling Under Flanders) | 3 |
| Canada CHR/Top 40 (BDS) | 6 |
| Canada Top Singles (RPM) | 13 |
| Canada Adult Contemporary (RPM) | 15 |
| Canada Dance/Urban (RPM) | 9 |
| Canada (Nielsen SoundScan) | 20 |
| Europe (Eurochart Hot 100) | 59 |
| France (SNEP) | 85 |
| Germany (GfK) | 58 |
| Iceland (Íslenski Listinn Topp 40) | 2 |
| Ireland (IRMA) | 25 |
| Netherlands (Dutch Top 40) | 22 |
| Netherlands (Single Top 100) | 23 |
| New Zealand (Recorded Music NZ) | 1 |
| Scottish Singles Sales (Official Charts) | 26 |
| Sweden (Sverigetopplistan) | 57 |
| UK Singles (Official Charts) | 13 |
| UK Hip Hop/R&B (Official Charts) | 4 |
| US Billboard Hot 100 | 1 |
| US Adult Contemporary (Billboard) | 25 |
| US Hot R&B/Hip-Hop Songs (Billboard) | 2 |
| US Pop Airplay (Billboard) | 3 |
| US Rhythmic Airplay (Billboard) | 1 |

=== Year-end charts ===
1998 year-end chart performance for "Have You Ever?"
| Chart (1998) | Position |
|---|---|
| US Rhythmic Top 40 (Billboard) | 84 |

1999 year-end chart performance for "Have You Ever?"
| Chart (1999) | Position |
|---|---|
| Australia (ARIA) | 47 |
| Canada Top Singles (RPM) | 68 |
| Canada Adult Contemporary (RPM) | 83 |
| Netherlands (Dutch Top 40) | 146 |
| US Billboard Hot 100 | 14 |
| US Hot R&B/Hip-Hop Singles & Tracks (Billboard) | 39 |
| US Mainstream Top 40 (Billboard) | 14 |
| US Rhythmic Top 40 (Billboard) | 8 |

== Certifications ==
Certifications for "Have You Ever"
| Region | Certification | Certified units/sales |
|---|---|---|
| Australia (ARIA) | Platinum | 70,000^{^} |
| New Zealand (RMNZ) | Platinum | 30,000^{‡} |
^{^} Shipments figures based on certification alone.^{‡} Sales+streaming figures based on certification alone.

== Release history ==
Release dates and formats for "Have You Ever?"
| Region | Date | Format(s) | Label(s) | Ref. |
|---|---|---|---|---|
| United States | October 6, 1998 | Contemporary hit radio; rhythmic contemporary radio; urban contemporary radio | Atlantic | |
| Japan | November 5, 1998 | CD | Atlantic | |
| United Kingdom | November 30, 1998 | CD; cassette | Atlantic | |
| Germany | December 29, 1998 | CD | Atlantic | |

== Cover versions ==
- In 2003, American Idol finalist Trenyce, performed this song on the Final 6 Diane Warren show. She eventually placed fifth in the competition.
- In 2006, Dutch singer Esmée Denters covered the song on YouTube, which led to her getting a record deal with Justin Timberlake's Tennman Records.
- On Australian Idol season 4 in 2006, eventual runner-up Jessica Mauboy performed Have You Ever on the Final 7 performance show.
- In 2007, Irish boy band Westlife remade a version of the song on their album Back Home
- In 2008, Filipino pop singer Nina Girado released her rendition of the song on her fourth studio album Nina Sings The Hits of Diane Warren
- In 2009, another Filipino pop singer Sarah Geronimo did a cover version of the song for seventh album Music and Me.
- In 2014, The X Factor contestant Stephanie Nala covered the song in the bottom two sing off.
- July 2025 American girl group 3Quency performed Have You Ever? on Netflix's Building_the_Band
- In 2019, Idols South Africa contestant Sneziey Msomi covered the song for the Top 7 show with the Love Songs theme.
