= Divas Live '99 =

VH1 Divas Live 99

Live album by VH1 Divas Live
- Released: November 2, 1999
- Recorded: April 13, 1999
- Genres: Soul, pop
- Length: 73:00
- Label: Arista

VH1 Divas Live chronology
VH1 Divas 1998 (1998)	VH1 Divas Live 99 (1999)	VH1 Divas 2000 (2000)

VH1 Divas Live 2: An Honors Concert for VH1's Save the Music Foundation, aired live from New York's Beacon Theatre on April 13, 1999, the second installment in VH1's successful VH1 Divas concert series. The concert was released as an album in November 1999.

== Performers ==
(in order of appearance)

- Tina Turner
- Elton John
- Cher
- LeAnn Rimes
- Brandy
- Faith Hill
- Whitney Houston
- Mary J. Blige
- Treach
- Chaka Khan

== Presenters ==
- Sarah Michelle Gellar
- Gloria Reuben
- Elizabeth Hurley
- Ashley Judd
- Cheri Oteri
- Ana Gasteyer
- Molly Shannon
- Claudia Schiffer

== Set list ==
- Tina Turner - "The Best"
- Tina Turner - "Let's Stay Together"
- Tina Turner & Elton John - "The Bitch Is Back"
- Tina Turner, Elton John, & Cher - "Proud Mary"
- Elton John - "I'm Still Standing"
- Elton John & LeAnn Rimes - "Written in the Stars"
- LeAnn Rimes - "How Do I Live"
- Elton John - "Like Father Like Son" – Not released on CD or DVD
- Cher - "If I Could Turn Back Time"
- Cher - "Believe"
- Brandy - "Have You Ever?"/"Almost Doesn't Count"
- Brandy & Faith Hill - "(Everything I Do) I Do It for You"
- Faith Hill - "This Kiss"
- Whitney Houston - "It's Not Right, But It's Okay"
- Whitney Houston & Mary J. Blige - "Ain't No Way"
- Whitney Houston & Treach - "My Love Is Your Love"
- Whitney Houston - "I Will Always Love You"
- Whitney Houston & Chaka Khan - "I'm Every Woman"
- Whitney Houston, Chaka Khan, Faith Hill, Brandy, LeAnn Rimes & Mary J. Blige - "I'm Every Woman (reprise)"

== CD track listing ==
No.	Title	Performer(s)	Length
1.	"The Best"	Tina Turner	5:39
2.	"The Bitch Is Back"	Tina Turner & Elton John	3:46
3.	"Proud Mary"	Tina Turner, Elton John & Cher	6:02
4.	"If I Could Turn Back Time"	Cher	4:13
5.	"How Do I Live"	LeAnn Rimes	4:20
6.	"I'm Still Standing"	Elton John	3:13
7.	"Have You Ever?/Almost Doesn't Count"	Brandy	4:45
8.	"(Everything I Do) I Do It for You"	Brandy & Faith Hill	4:23
9.	"This Kiss"	Faith Hill	3:23
10.	"Ain't No Way"	Whitney Houston & Mary J. Blige	5:53
11.	"I Will Always Love You"	Whitney Houston	6:48
12.	"I'm Every Woman"	Whitney Houston & Chaka Khan	5:03
13.	"I'm Every Woman" (reprise)	Whitney Houston, Chaka Khan, Faith Hill, Brandy, Mary J. Blige & LeAnn Rimes	2:00

== Personnel ==
- Guitar: David Barry, Paul Jackson Jr., Davey Johnstone, John Miles, James Ralston, Ira Seigel, Lou Toomey
- Bass: Jerry Barnes, Bob Birch, Ricky Minor
- Drums: Jack Bruno, Rocky Bryant
- Keyboards: Guy Babylon, Jerry Barnes, Tim Cappello, Jetro da Silva, Barry Eastman, Steve Hornbeak, Herman Jackson, Paul Mikorich, John Miles, Leon Pendarvis, Darrell Smith, Bette Sussman
- Percussion: Bashiri Johnson, John Mahon, Willie Martinez
- Saxophone: Gerald Albright, Tim Capello
- Backing Vocals: Terry Aydelott, Kathy Almon, Katreese Barnes, Christopher Bryant, Stacy Campbell, LaVerta Cooks, Deborah Floyd, Gary Garland, Sharlotte Gibson, Lisa Gregg, Patricia Darcy Jones, Audrey Martells, Jenny Douglas McRae, Cindy Mizelle, Bettina Pennon, Valerie Pinkston, Mica Roberts, Andrea Rodgers, Mike Snowden, Audrey Wheeler, Frank White

== Charts and certifications ==
=== Charts ===
Chart (2000)	Peak position
Austrian Albums (Ö3 Austria)	43
Dutch Albums (Album Top 100)	41
French Albums (SNEP)	42
German Albums (Offizielle Top 100)	60
Swiss Albums (Schweizer Hitparade)	14
US Billboard 200	90
US Top R&B/Hip-Hop Albums (Billboard)	78

== Certifications ==
Region	Certification	Certified units/sales
Brazil (Pro-Música Brasil)	Gold	100,000^{*}
United States (RIAA)	Gold	500,000^{^}
United States (RIAA) DVD	Gold	50,000^{^}
^{*} Sales figures based on certification alone.^{^} Shipments figures based on certification alone.
