= List of number-one R&B albums of 1998 (Canada) =

This is a list of the R&B albums that ranked number one in Canada during 1998 according to SoundScan. Each weekly chart is based on sales "compiled from a national sample of retail store and mass merchants' reports."

== Chart history ==
Key
†	Best-selling R&B album of 1998

Week ended	Album	Artist	Label	Ref.
January 4, 1998	Harlem World	Mase	Arista	
January 11, 1998	My Way	Usher	Arista	
January 18, 1998	My Way	Usher	Arista	
January 25, 1998	Money, Power & Respect	The Lox	Arista	
February 1, 1998	Big Willie Style	Will Smith	Columbia	
February 8, 1998	Big Willie Style	Will Smith	Columbia	
February 15, 1998	Big Willie Style	Will Smith	Columbia	
February 22, 1998	Big Willie Style	Will Smith	Columbia	
March 1, 1998	Big Willie Style	Will Smith	Columbia	
March 8, 1998	Big Willie Style	Will Smith	Columbia	
March 15, 1998	Big Willie Style	Will Smith	Columbia	
March 22, 1998	Big Willie Style	Will Smith	Columbia	
March 29, 1998	Big Willie Style	Will Smith	Columbia	
April 5, 1998	The Pillage	Cappadonna	Columbia	
April 12, 1998	Big Willie Style	Will Smith	Columbia	
April 19, 1998	Big Willie Style	Will Smith	Columbia	
April 26, 1998	Big Willie Style	Will Smith	Columbia	
May 3, 1998	Capital Punishment	Big Pun	RCA	
May 10, 1998	Bulworth	Various Artists	Interscope	
May 17, 1998	Bulworth	Various Artists	Interscope	
May 24, 1998	Bulworth	Various Artists	Interscope	
May 31, 1998	Bulworth	Various Artists	Interscope	
June 7, 1998	Bulworth	Various Artists	Interscope	
June 14, 1998	Never Say Never†	Brandy	Atlantic	
June 21, 1998	Never Say Never†	Brandy	Atlantic	
June 28, 1998	Never Say Never†	Brandy	Atlantic	
July 5, 1998	Never Say Never†	Brandy	Atlantic	
July 12, 1998	Never Say Never†	Brandy	Atlantic	
July 19, 1998	Never Say Never†	Brandy	Atlantic	
July 26, 1998	Never Say Never†	Brandy	Atlantic	
August 2, 1998	Never Say Never†	Brandy	Atlantic	
August 9, 1998	Da Game Is to Be Sold, Not to Be Told	Snoop Dogg	Virgin	
August 16, 1998	Never Say Never†	Brandy	Atlantic	
August 23, 1998	Never Say Never†	Brandy	Atlantic	
August 30, 1998	Never Say Never†	Brandy	Atlantic	
September 6, 1998	Never Say Never†	Brandy	Atlantic	
September 13, 1998	Can-I-Bus	Canibus	Universal	
September 20, 1998	Never Say Never†	Brandy	Atlantic	
September 27, 1998	Never Say Never†	Brandy	Atlantic	
October 4, 1998	The Miseducation of Lauryn Hill	Lauryn Hill	Columbia	
October 11, 1998	The Miseducation of Lauryn Hill	Lauryn Hill	Columbia	
October 18, 1998	The Miseducation of Lauryn Hill	Lauryn Hill	Columbia	
October 25, 1998	The Miseducation of Lauryn Hill	Lauryn Hill	Columbia	
November 1, 1998	The Miseducation of Lauryn Hill	Lauryn Hill	Columbia	
November 8, 1998	The Miseducation of Lauryn Hill	Lauryn Hill	Columbia	
November 15, 1998	The Miseducation of Lauryn Hill	Lauryn Hill	Columbia	
November 22, 1998	Tical 2000: Judgement Day	Method Man	Def Jam	
November 29, 1998	#1's	Mariah Carey	Columbia	
December 6, 1998	#1's	Mariah Carey	Columbia	
December 13, 1998	#1's	Mariah Carey	Columbia	
December 20, 1998	#1's	Mariah Carey	Columbia	
December 27, 1998	#1's	Mariah Carey	Columbia	
