= Never Say Never (Brandy album) =

Studio album by Brandy
- Released: June 9, 1998
- Recorded: May 1997 – April 1998
- Studios: Pacifique; Record One; Sony (Los Angeles); Chartmaker Studios (Malibu); Banana Boat; The Enterprise (Burbank); The Hit Factory (New York City); DARP (Atlanta)
- Genres: R&B; pop
- Length: 66:34
- Label: Atlantic
- Producers: Brandy Norwood; Rodney Jerkins; Dallas Austin; David Foster; Fred Jerkins III; Brad Gilderman; Harvey Mason, Jr.; Marc Nelson; Guy Roche

Brandy chronology
| Brandy (1994) | Never Say Never (1998) | Full Moon (2002) |

Singles from Never Say Never
- 1. "The Boy Is Mine" Released: May 4, 1998; 2. "Top of the World" Released: July 7, 1998; 3. "Have You Ever?" Released: October 6, 1998; 4. "Almost Doesn't Count" Released: March 23, 1999; 5. "U Don't Know Me (Like U Used To)" Released: September 14, 1999; 6. "(Everything I Do) I Do It for You" Released: November 1999

Never Say Never is the second studio album by American singer Brandy. It was released on June 9, 1998, by Atlantic Records. Atlantic consulted David Foster, as well as producer Rodney "Darkchild" Jerkins and his team to work with Norwood on the record; Jerkins went on to craft the majority of the album and would evolve as Norwood's mentor and lead producer on her subsequent projects.

The lyrical themes on the album include the singer's personal experiences with love, monogamy, media bias, and maturity. Influenced by singers Mariah Carey and Whitney Houston, Norwood wanted to present a more mature facet of herself with the album, incorporating a ballad-heavy style and an adult contemporary feel into her urban pop sound for the album.

Upon its release, Never Say Never facilitated Norwood in becoming a viable recording artist with media-crossing appeal. It debuted at No. 3 on the US Billboard 200 chart, selling 160,000 copies in its first week, and peaked at No. 2 the following week, remaining within the chart's top 20 for 28 weeks. Six of the album's 16 songs were chosen as singles, including the US Billboard Hot 100 number-one singles "The Boy Is Mine" (with Monica) and "Have You Ever?", as well as the global hit "Top of the World".

Never Say Never became Norwood's highest-selling and highest-charting album to date in most international markets, being certified quintuple platinum by the Recording Industry Association of America (RIAA) and selling over 16 million copies worldwide. It won numerous awards and accolades, including a Grammy Award for Best R&B Performance by a Duo or Group with Vocals for "The Boy Is Mine". The album was supported by the Never Say Never World Tour (1999), which included sold-out shows in North America, Europe, and Asia.

== Background and development ==
Following the release of her multi-platinum eponymous debut album (1994) and several equally successful soundtrack contributions such as "Sittin' Up in My Room" from Waiting to Exhale (1995) and "Missing You" from Set It Off (1996), Norwood took a lengthy musical break in which she graduated from high school, enrolled in college and established a flourishing acting career. In 1995, she was cast in the titular role in the UPN sitcom Moesha, and in the following two years, she appeared opposite her idol Whitney Houston in the musical television film Cinderella (1997) and filmed the slasher film sequel I Still Know What You Did Last Summer (1998). While she enjoyed her acting profile accomplishments, Norwood felt that her transition had caused people to recognize her more as an actress than as a singer. At one point she even considered giving up singing to concentrate on acting due to the ever changing music industry and losing her passion for it. According to her, "I think the music industry has changed so much... I don't know how to look at my first video... There was so much happening... And I'd rather go out with the first album, bang, and not have to come back and not be able to do the same thing again. Nevertheless, after Brandy's commercial success, she was heavily pressured, stating: "It's very important to me that my music connects with the general public.

For a while, she placed the recording of the album on the "back burner" because she was "barely satisfied" with the material that was presented to her. She found that many songs would not express what she wanted to say at that point of her career. According to her, "Many of the songs I heard were not 'me'," the singer stated during a promotional interview with Jet in 1999, "And If I can't feel it, then I won't sing it." Also, after Brandy, she felt she needed to do something different, while exploring her voice and playing with different sounds. Elaborating on her desire for progression and a more mature sound, Norwood added, that "I'm not the little girl I was when I made my first record. My voice is a strong instrument now; my vocals come from both my heart and my diaphragm. My heart because I matured in the four years since the last album; I'm more emotionally there." Her interest in her music was renewed when she met then-upcoming producer Rodney Jerkins and his production team. "They really turned it around. When I met Rodney, his tracks were so mean, so unbelievable, and the writing that LaShawn and Japhe did, they came to the table and they really brought a lot of the fill ins that I had inside of me out. They changed my whole perspective on the music thing. When I started to work with them, I wanted to go to the studio every day. I wanted to sing every day. I didn't want to act anymore after that", says Norwood.

== Recording and production ==
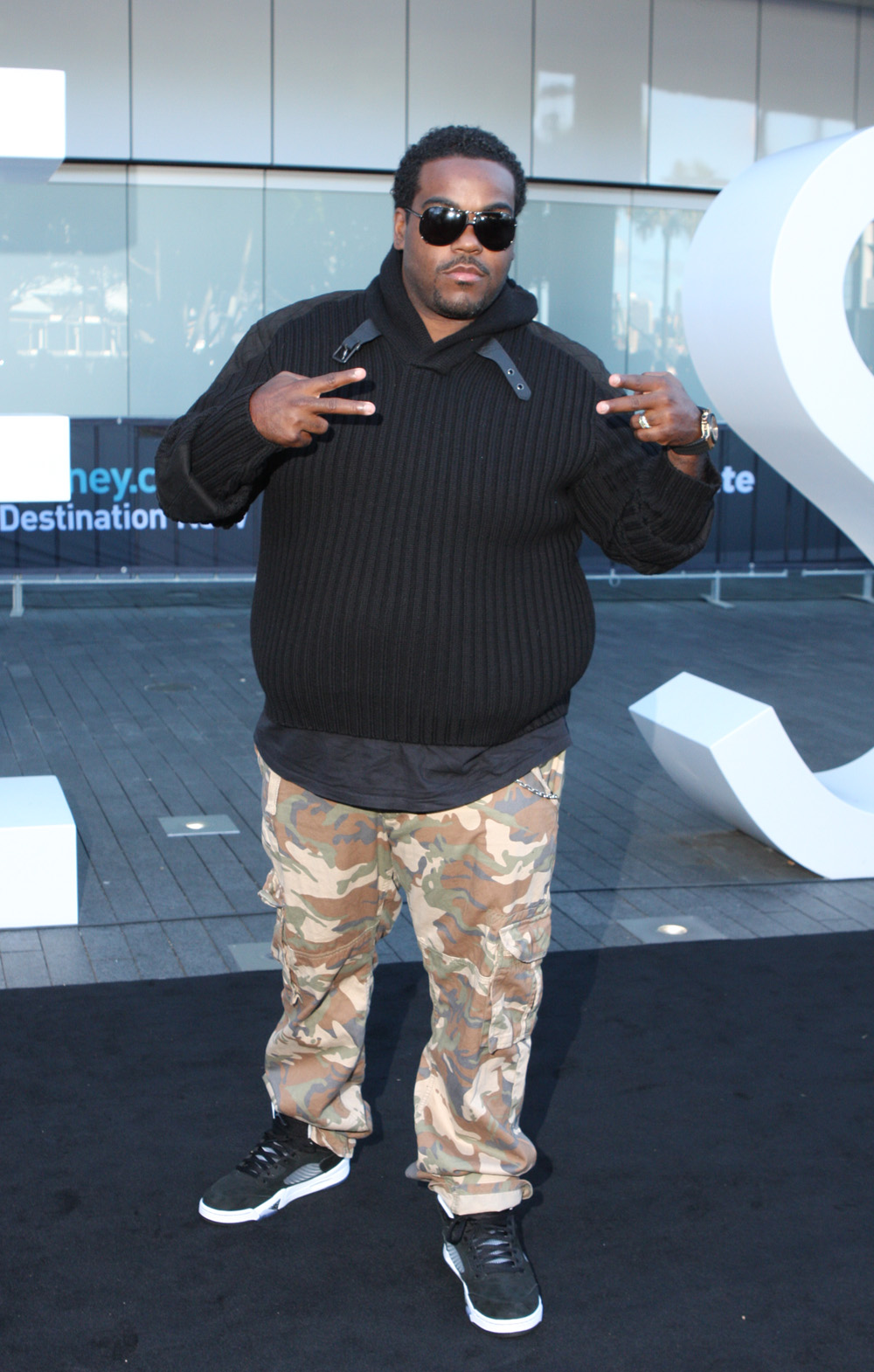
Never Say Never was executive produced by Rodney Jerkins (pictured) and his team.

Production for the album dates back as early as May 1997, during this time MTV News reported that Norwood was "taking up two recording studios in both New York and Los Angeles, and is working on what she hopes will be a fall release". Producers that were slated to work on the album at that point were Sean "Puffy" Combs, Babyface, David Foster, and Keith Crouch. During the early recording stages she recorded a few songs with Puffy but didn't finish them due to their hectic schedules. The plan was for the pair to resume what they had started. According to her: "I'm going to go back in the studio with him. I'm really excited to work with Puffy. I'm more nervous than excited because I'm like the biggest Puffy fan. The last time I worked with Puffy, I couldn't even sing right". Norwood was also planning to record a song with Wyclef Jean, in which she expressed that she had heard that his track was "so hot" and she was "ready to go in there and sing it, master it, get it done, and put it on the album". Rapper and songwriter-producer Missy Elliott was also requested as a producer at one point.

Recording for the album resumed in October 1997, with Norwood confirming that she was "right in the middle" of completing the album. She stated that the material was going to be "sophisticated a little, a little sexy, a little edge, but I'm still gonna be innocent, you know, I still have to give 'em that America's sweetheart thing. I have to do that, can't never get rid of that". The albums mature direction can be attributed to Norwood being influenced by Celine Dion, Mariah Carey, Whitney Houston, and Jewel. "I look at all these other female artists that are coming out and who've done so well. I get to see what they're doin' with they self, you know, and the imaging and the songs, and I get to take bits and pieces from everybody and put it into my own style", says Norwood.

Eventually, Rodney Jerkins jumped on board and the pair recorded "The Boy Is Mine"; the sixth track recorded for the album. Norwood stated that the song was not a friendship type of duet, "you've seen friendship duets like Whitney, Cece and different duets. This is Brandy and Monica, like, they're, we're just gettin' it on". Jerkins was brought in when Atlantic Records A&R Paris Davis called him to meet with Norwood at Georgia's, a restaurant in Los Angeles. Accompanied by his brother Fred Jerkins III and songwriter LaShawn Daniels, he ended up completing five songs in five days with her, including “Learn the Hard Way”, “Happy”, “Put That on Everything,” and title track “Never Say Never.” Satisfied with their output, Atlantic Records secured a production deal with Jerkins's team and encouraged them to work on more material for the album. With Jerkins and his team producing the majority on the album, he was eventually promoted to executive producer on the album.

Jerkins and his circle worked excessively on the album, with typical sessions starting in the afternoon and lasting until the early morning hours. Despite the physical distance between the recording studios and Jerkins's native in New Jersey, he brought many of his family and friends to Los Angeles to help work on the album. His brother Fred quit his steady job working at Prudential Insurance Company to work with Norwood on Never Say Never, while his sister Sybil received co-writing credits on the album. Drawing from their own experiences, many titles of Never Say Never were built on a cliché book in the studio. With Jerkins being inspired by the singer/producer partnerships of Jimmy Jam & Terry Lewis and Janet Jackson as well as the influence of DeVante Swing on Jodeci's sound, he envisioned a full body of work for Norwood's second album, telling: "I wanted to make records where you fell in love with and heard the journey of the artists from beginning to end. The intro is just as important as the song, the outro is just as important. Once I got Brandy to believe in that vision, then we just locked in."

Apart from Jerkins and Darkchild crew, Norwood also worked with Canadian producer David Foster on the album. Lending a certain level of adult contemporary–pop crossover credibility to the project, he would produce three songs on Never Say Never, including "Have You Ever?," written by his frequent collaborator Diane Warren, the Gordon Chambers-penned "One Voice" and "(Everything I Do) I Do It for You," a cover version of Canadian singer Bryan Adams's 1991 song. Initially she was scared to record "huge" pop ballads because she didn't know if she "could pull it off", however Foster showed her "the insides of doing a pop ballad". Norwood recorded songs multiple times if she wasn't satisfied with them. She stated: "I'll do a song, and then go in my car and listen to someone's CD and if that sounds better than what I did, I'll have to go do it again. Like I listened to number 4 on Mariah's album, I said, "Oh my God, I have to do the slow song again, it has to be just like this, it has to be this type of quality." Ultimately, she credits the chemistry with Jerkins and Foster for her musical growth: "They brought out the best in me, the vocals I didn't know I had," she said. Aside from improving vocally, she further showed musical growth by co-writing and producing songs on the album.

== Music and lyrics ==
The album's opening track "Angel in Disguise" is a Rodney Jerkins-produced mid-tempo track that features backing vocals by fellow R&B singer Joe. It consists of a "dribbling bass line" that Chuck Taylor of Billboard compared to a "dreamlike, moonlit night". The harmonic background song, created using the so-called multi-track recording, was described as "enchanting" and "seductive". The lyrics of "Angel in Disguise" describe a protagonist who still loves her partner despite his infidelity, with Norwood quoted: "An angel in disguise she was / But somehow you fell for her / Till she broke your heart that day / And left you in the rain / But still I love you". Set as the album's lead single, "The Boy Is Mine" was originally intended to be a solo song for Brandy, but due to Monica's success at the time, it was conceived as a duet. Inspired by Michael Jackson and Paul McCartney's 1982 duet "The Girl Is Mine", the lyrics of the mid-tempo R&B track revolve around two women fighting over a man. "Learn the Hard Way" is the album's fourth track and shares similarities with the album's title track. The song's background revolves around Norwood telling a man "it's a shame you had to learn the hard way", and the lyrics quote: "You did me wrong / You told me lies / Treated me bad / All of the time." The lyrics also show Norwood does not feel sympathy for him after all he's done. The Guy Roche-produced "Almost Doesn't Count" follows; its lyrics revolve around its writer Shelly Peiken's powerful but unfruitful on-again, off-again relationship she had with a man while in college. Peiken recalled her emotions during a writing session with Roche decades later when she "dug up that laundry list of all the 'almosts' I felt we had, and we put it into the song." In a 2020 interview, she further elaborated about the lyrics: "It was a relationship that was more in my head than in his, and I always felt like we almost got there, he almost said I love you, he almost broke up with the girlfriend he had the whole time. He almost faced his feelings but he never quite got there – maybe that was all in my head too. Maybe he never had any of those feelings, maybe it was all my imagination." Brandy performed the song in the 1999 television film Double Platinum, starring Diana Ross and herself. The international single "Top of the World" is the album's sixth track. It is a collaboration with Mase and talks about Brandy as a popstar "just trying to be her" and not feeling like being in her own world.

The Darkchild-produced "U Don't Know Me (Like U Used To)", which is the album's seventh and final single, is noted for its remix version with Shaunta and Da Brat. The title track, also produced by Rodney Jerkins, is the eighth song of the album. "Truthfully", a ballad about a broken relationship, was written by former Boyz II Men member, singer-songwriter Marc Nelson. Recorded in a single take, it took Nelson five different sessions to get Norwood in the recording studio as she felt initially nervous about working with him. Main production on the song was helmed by Harvey Mason, Jr., who received his first major placement as a producer on "Truthfully". Mason was consulted by Jerkins after he had shopped around several tracks for record executives. The No. 1 single "Have You Ever?" is the album's tenth track. Brandy states that it was the first time she had been in the studio with a producer like David Foster, initially being nervous about recording the song. In the song's lyrics, Norwood sings about unrequited love with lyrics such as "Have you finally found the one you've given your heart to / Only to find that one will not give their heart to you". "Put That on Everything", a mid-tempo ballad, is the album's eleventh track. The album's twelfth track "In the Car Interlude" is actually a phone conversation in the car between Brandy, Rodney and Fred Jerkins. "Happy", an R&B up-tempo song, was the album's thirteenth track. It was also featured in Double Platinum and received positive reception from Rolling Stone. It also served as the theme song of the 2002 MTV reality television series Brandy: Special Delivery. "One Voice", the fourteenth track, was the official UNICEF theme song during its 50th anniversary celebration. Entertainment Weekly describes her voice in the song as "soft and smoky" and as a "gospel-fired ballad that finds her effortlessly raising the roof". "Tomorrow", a nearly six-minutes-long ballad, is the fifteenth track and the album's longest song. The final song on the album is the Bryan Adams cover "(Everything I Do) I Do It for You".

== Release and promotion ==
Never Say Never was released in the United States on June 9, 1998, by Atlantic Records; its double-disc limited edition was released exclusively in Australia on July 13, 1999. Promotion for Never Say Never began with Brandy's appearance on music magazine Vibe's April 1998 cover, followed by a massive print campaign, including cover shoots for Teen People and Ebony as well as coverage in fanzines. The co-marketing venture between Vibe and Atlantic Records resulted in a number of joint projects, such as a Vibe–Brandy website, a college marketing tour, and several retail and radio promotions. With television channel MTV, Brandy hosted the network's spring break shows in Jamaica on March 13–15.

On May 14, Brandy performed "The Boy Is Mine" for the first time, solo on The Tonight Show with Jay Leno. In June, Brandy performed "Top of the World" alongside Mase at the 1998 MTV Movie Awards. On June 13, MTV aired a special in which Brandy presented a video countdown that consisted of her favorite music videos. The following day, MTV produced a 30-minute Ultra Sound segment special about her. On June 16, Brandy appeared on CBS This Morning. On July 17, Brandy went on The View; Three days later, she appeared on Live with Regis and Kathie Lee. On July 22, Brandy appeared on Late Night with Conan O'Brien. On August 28, she made yet another appearance on The Tonight Show with Jay Leno; this time performing "Have You Ever". On September 3, Brandy performed the remix version of "Top of the World" alongside rappers Big Pun and Fat Joe at the Soul Train Lady of Soul Awards. Also in September, Brandy and Monica performed "The Boy Is Mine" live for the first time together at the 1998 MTV Video Music Awards. On September 26, Brandy performed at the Hip-Hop Unity Festival held at the Los Angeles Memorial Coliseum. On October 11, Brandy performed at the 1998 International Achievement in Arts Awards. Two days later she made an appearance on The Rosie O'Donnell Show.

On January 11, 1999, Brandy and actress Melissa Joan Hart hosted the 1999 American Music Awards at the Shrine Auditorium in Los Angeles. During the award ceremony, she performed her song "Have You Ever?". On January 31, Brandy and rapper LL Cool J hosted Miami radio station WEDR's Super Bowl concert, surrounding Super Bowl XXXIII. In March 1999, Brandy joined former First Lady Hillary Rodham Clinton and Attorney General Janet Reno at the National Museum of Women in the Arts to recognize six young women that were selected for the second annual Volunteerism Awards. On April 13, Brandy performed alongside Whitney Houston, Tina Turner, Cher, Chaka Khan, and Faith Hill, among others, at VH1 Divas Live '99. By May 1999, Brandy had embarked on a world tour with shows in France, Germany, the Netherlands, and Japan. Also in May, she performed "Almost Doesn't Count" on The Tonight Show with Jay Leno In June, Brandy returned to the US for the North American leg of her tour which was originally scheduled to run from June 18 to August 2. The tour was cut short because she had to film the then-upcoming fifth season of her UPN sitcom Moesha. On September 8, 1999, she performed "U Don't Know Me (Like U Used To)", on The Tonight Show with Jay Leno.

In retail, a Brandy standee was provided to merchants, while the album was made part of "price and positing" programs at all major national accounts and urban indie accounts nationally upon its release. Other marketing items for Never Say Never included a partnering with DC Comics, which created a Brandy comic book in September 1998 for junior high and high school students. Atlantic also discussed plans with Disney for a cross-promotion between the home video version of Cinderella (1997) and the album, as well as the production of a major TV special, involving corporate sponsors.

== Singles ==
"The Boy Is Mine", a duet with singer Monica, was the first song to be lifted from Never Say Never in May 1998. Released to generally positive reviews from contemporary music critics, it became the first No. 1 pop record for both artists, both stateside and internationally. In the United States, "The Boy Is Mine" became the best-selling song of the year, spending 13 weeks on top of the US Billboard Hot 100 during the summer of 1998. It was certified double platinum by the Recording Industry Association of America (RIAA) and ranked eighth on Billboard's decade-end chart. Internationally, the single also achieved a strong charting, peaking at No. 1 in Canada, the Netherlands and New Zealand, while reaching the top five on most of the other charts on which it appeared. "Top of the World" featuring rapper Mase served as the album's second single. The song was less successful around the world, but reached No. 2 on the UK Singles Chart. It was certified silver by the British Phonographic Industry (BPI) on October 23, 1998.

"Have You Ever?" was released as the album's third single throughout fall 1998. It became the second song from Never Say Never to reach the top position on both the Billboard Hot 100 and the New Zealand Singles Chart, while reaching the top twenty in most English-speaking countries. The ballad garnered a generally mixed reception from critics and was ranked 14th on Billboard's 1999 year-end chart. Midtempo track "Angel in Disguise" featuring prominent backing vocals by singer Joe, was released as a radio single on January 21, 1999, in the United States only. It reached the top twenty on the Billboard's Hot R&B/Hip-Hop Songs based on airplay alone. "Almost Doesn't Count" was released in the second quarter of 1999, serving as the album's fifth single. The ballad reached the top twenty on the majority of all charts it appeared on and was promoted by a performance in the 1999 film Double Platinum, starring Diana Ross and Brandy herself.

"U Don't Know Me (Like U Used To)" was selected as the album's fifth single and marked the final single to be released from Never Say Never in North America. A minor commercial success, the song reached No. 79 on the Billboard Hot 100 and the top thirty on the Hot R&B/Hip-Hop Songs chart. In support of the single, a remix version of the track featuring female rappers Shaunta and Da Brat was released, accompanied by a remix EP entitled U Don't Know Me... Like U Used To – The Remix EP. In German-speaking Europe, "U Don't Know Me (Like U Used To)" appeared as a B-side on the promotional single "Never Say Never". It failed to chart, however. In Oceania, the Bryan Adams cover "(Everything I Do) I Do It for You" was released as the album's sixth single instead. It reached No. 28 on the New Zealand Singles Chart.

== Critical reception ==
Professional ratings
Review scores
| Source | Rating |
|---|---|
| AllMusic | 3.5/5 stars |
| Entertainment Weekly | B |
| The Independent | 2/4 |
| Los Angeles Times | 2/4 stars |
| Robert Christgau | (2-star Honorable Mention) |
| Rolling Stone | 3/5 stars |
| The Rolling Stone Album Guide | 3.5/5 stars |
| The Sydney Morning Herald | 2.5/4 stars |
| Q | 4/5 stars |

Never Say Never received mixed reviews from music critics. Stephen Thomas Erlewine of AllMusic gave the album four out of five stars, calling it a "better, more adventurous record than her debut" and noting that Brandy "wisely decides to find a middle ground between Mariah Carey and Mary J. Blige — it's adult contemporary with a slight streetwise edge." He praised her improved delivery, writing that her "subdued vocals can make mediocre material sound convincing," and concluded that the album's strength lay in its quality songs and production rather than Brandy's performance alone. Richard Harrington of The Spokesman-Review highlighted Brandy's involvement as co-writer on six of the album's sixteen tracks and noted that she sounded grown-up and confident, navigating the material without taking any false steps. Lorraine Ali from Rolling Stone complimented Brandy's natural charm and effervescence, and writing that she exudes more personality than some of her contemporaries, bringing a lively energy to the record. Similarly, Daryl Easlea of BBC Music described the album as "the epitome of a mixed bag" but recognized it as an intelligent interpretation of late-1990s commercial R&B that deviated enough from the era's typical "ornate musical box" productions to play to both Brandy and executive producer Rodney Jerkins's considerable strengths.

However, several critics were less impressed with the album. Paul Verna of Billboard observed that, while Brandy showed moments of maturity and confidence on tracks like "The Boy Is Mine," the album was filled with "trend-conscious moves," including guest raps from Mase and melodies reminiscent of Janet Jackson, suggesting that Brandy should focus on developing her own artistic identity rather than imitating other performers. J. D. Considine of Entertainment Weekly criticized Brandy's performance for lacking vocal passion, writing that much of the material "end up[s] sounding pretty much the same," which flattened the emotional range of the album despite technically competent singing. Angela Lewis of The Independent echoed this sentiment, calling the album "pop R&B without the soul" and questioning Brandy's potential in the adult music market. She noted that Brandy lacked command on tracks like "Have You Ever?" and seemed better suited to following the rules of pop R&B than innovating within it. Robert Christgau gave the album a two-star honorable mention, highlighting only three tracks—"The Boy Is Mine," "U Don't Know Me," and "Almost Doesn't Count"—and implying that the rest of the album was largely forgettable. Even Music Week observed that while Brandy's previous success would likely ensure chart performance in the UK, the album offered little beyond her established image and maturity, suggesting limited artistic growth. Mary Tartaglione from The Sydney Morning Herald described Brandy as a promising young artist, but concluded that Never Say Never, despite a strong opening and the standout track "Top of the World," ultimately suffered from inconsistency and limited lasting impact.

== Accolades ==
| Year | Award | Category | Nominee(s) | Result | Ref. |
|---|---|---|---|---|---|
| 1998 | MTV Video Music Awards | Video of the Year | "The Boy Is Mine" | Nominated | |
| 1998 | MTV Video Music Awards | Best R&B Video | "The Boy Is Mine" | Nominated | |
| 1998 | Billboard Music Video Awards | Best R&B/Urban Clip | "The Boy Is Mine" | Won | |
| 1999 | Grammy Awards | Record of the Year | "The Boy Is Mine" | Nominated | |
| 1999 | Grammy Awards | Best R&B Song | "The Boy Is Mine" | Nominated | |
| 1999 | Grammy Awards | Best R&B Performance by a Duo or Group with Vocals | "The Boy Is Mine" | Won | |
| 1999 | Grammy Awards | Best R&B Album | Never Say Never | Nominated | |
| 1999 | Echo Awards | Newcomer of the year, International | Never Say Never | Nominated | |
| 1999 | Soul Train Music Awards | Best Female R&B/Soul Album, Female | Never Say Never | Nominated | |
| 1999 | Soul Train Music Awards | Best R&B/Soul Single, Group, Band or Duo | "The Boy Is Mine" | Nominated | |
| 1999 | MTV Video Music Awards | Best R&B Video | "Have You Ever?" | Nominated | |
| 2000 | Grammy Awards | Best Female R&B Vocal Performance | "Almost Doesn't Count" | Nominated | |

== Commercial performance ==
Never Say Never debuted at No. 3 on the Billboard 200 for the week of June 16, 1998, selling 160,000 units in its first week–Norwood's largest first-week sales. The following week, the album managed to climb up to its peak position at No. 2, even though its sales had dipped slightly to 152,000 copies. On the US Top R&B/Hip-Hop Albums chart the album debuted and peaked at No. 2; where it charted for 68 consecutive weeks. By its 14th week on the Billboard 200 chart, Never Say Never had sold 1.4 million copies. By December 1998, Never Say Never sold 2.6 million copies in the United States. In January 1999 the album was ranked as the 13th best-selling album of 1998 with total sales at 2.9 million. The following year in January 2000, the album was the 62nd best-selling album of 1999 selling 1.3 million copies during that year. In March 2002 sales for the album stood at over 4.4 million copies sold. In February 2003 the album sold an additional 665,000 copies through BMG Music Club. By June 2004, Never Say Never sold 4.5 million copies. In total it has spent 72 consecutive weeks on the Billboard 200—28 of which were within the top 20—and as of 2012, the album has sold 4.6 million copies in the United States according to Nielsen Soundscan. In December 1999, the album was certified quintuple platinum by the Recording Industry Association of America (RIAA) for five million shipped units.

In Canada, Never Say Never debuted on RPM' s Top Albums/CDs chart at No. 3 on the issue dated June 29, 1998. The album remained at No. 3 for two additional weeks on the weeks ending on July 6 and July 13, 1998. Overall, the album has spent a total of 54 consecutive weeks on the Top Albums/CDs chart. On August 27, 1999, the album was certified Quadruple platinum by Music Canada for denoting shipments of 400,000 units. In the UK the album debuted at No. 21 on the UK Albums Chart on June 14, 1998. In its tenth week, the album climbed to a new peak of No. 19. The album went on to sell 260,000 copies in the United Kingdom, and was eventually certified platinum by the British Phonographic Industry (BPI), denoting shipments of 300,000 copies. By May 1999, Never Say Never had sold seven million copies worldwide, according to Billboard. To date, the album remains Norwood's biggest-selling effort with worldwide sales in excess of 16 million copies.

== Impact and legacy ==
While her debut album had been a major success in the United States, Never Say Never was credited with Norwood's international breakthrough and facilitated her in becoming a viable recording artist with media–crossing appeal in music, film, and television. Claire Lobenfeld from Fact found that while "Brandy's self-titled debut was sweet and flirty, its follow-up separated her from being just a pop singer with an accelerating star to one with something to say." HipHopDX's Aaron McKrell remarked that "Brandy's newfound maturity was reflected in her music, and audiences and critics alike raved about the pop-tinged R&B that permeated the album," with Lela Olds, writing for The Boombox, further reporting that she "grew confident as both an artist and a young woman on Never Say Never, creating an album that showed both personal and vocal growth." Never Say Never is Norwood's most successful album to date, with worldwide sales of 14 million records, including singles and album copies. One of the biggest-selling album of the year for WEA Music, Billboard ranked Never Say Never among the most successful comeback albums of 1998.

Musically, Never Say Never blueprinted Norwood's signature "silky, smooth sound" which would also dominate on following projects. In a 2018 anniversary retrospective, Vibe editor Brittney Fennell declared Never Say Never as Norwood's "career-defining magnum opus." She felt that "it is arguably one of the best R&B albums of the 90s [...] There were a plethora of young female R&B singers at this time, but Brandy's star power allowed her to transcend genres by transforming her style of R&B into pop music." In a similar article, Da’Shan Smith from Revolt noted that while the album "had an electric sensibility directed towards the approaching new millennium, they helped finalize the standard for what a pop&B diva's midtempos and ballads should consist of [...] Looking back at Never Say Never, one could argue that Brandy remodeled the construct of a teen-star-pushing-20." Critics noted that her ability to grow musically while simultaneously balancing life as an actress served as role model material for other teen singers such as Britney Spears and Christina Aguilera who had upcoming studio debuts. In fact, both Spears and Aguilera referred to Norwood and Never Say Never, as one of their influences during the recording sessions for their debut albums.

Aside from boosting Norwood's own success, Never Say Never became instrumental in promoting the careers of many from those involved in the making of the album who were relatively unknown prior to its release, notably chief producer Rodney Jerkins, his brother Fred and songwriter LaShawn Daniels. The trio would go on to work with industry veterans such as Michael Jackson, Whitney Houston, and Toni Braxton as well as upcoming performers such as Jennifer Lopez and Destiny's Child, while reteaming with Norwood – to varying commercial and critical success – on her third and fifth studio albums Full Moon (2002) and Human (2008). Norwood herself commented in a 2018 interview with music website Okayplayer: "Never Say Never changed the course of my life. I found one of the best producers [Rodney Jerkins] in the world to help me find my new sound. I was so free to try things vocally and the Darkchild team gave me their best work and sweet support." In 2020, she ranked the album among her three favorite releases.

== Track listing ==
Credits adapted from the liner notes of Never Say Never.

Never Say Never – Standard edition
| No. | Title | Writer(s) | Producer(s) | Length |
|---|---|---|---|---|
| 1. | "Intro" | | | 0:49 |
| 2. | "Angel in Disguise" | Rodney "Darkchild" Jerkins; Fred Jerkins III; LaShawn Daniels; Traci Hale; Nycolia "Tye-V" Turman; Joseph Lewis Thomas | R. Jerkins | 4:48 |
| 3. | "The Boy Is Mine" (duet with Monica) | Brandy Norwood; Monica Arnold; R. Jerkins; F. Jerkins III; Daniels; Japhe Tejeda | R. Jerkins; Dallas Austin; Norwood | 4:55 |
| 4. | "Learn the Hard Way" | Norwood; R. Jerkins; F. Jerkins III; Daniels; Sybil Jerkins Cherry; Rick Williams | R. Jerkins; Norwood^{[a]} | 4:51 |
| 5. | "Almost Doesn't Count" | Guy Roche; Shelly Peiken | F. Jerkins III; Roche | 3:37 |
| 6. | "Top of the World" (featuring Mase) | R. Jerkins; F. Jerkins III; Mason Betha; Daniels; Isaac Phillips; Turman | R. Jerkins; Norwood^{[a]} | 4:41 |
| 7. | "U Don't Know Me (Like U Used To)" | Norwood; R. Jerkins; Sean Bryant; Paris Davis; Phillips | R. Jerkins; Norwood^{[a]} | 4:28 |
| 8. | "Never Say Never" | Norwood; R. Jerkins; F. Jerkins; Daniels; Tejeda; Williams | R. Jerkins; Norwood^{[a]} | 5:10 |
| 9. | "Truthfully" | Brad Gilderman; R. Jerkins; Harvey Mason Jr.; Marc Nelson | Gilderman; R. Jerkins; Mason, Jr.; Nelson | 4:58 |
| 10. | "Have You Ever?" | Diane Warren | David Foster | 4:32 |
| 11. | "Put That on Everything" | Norwood; R. Jerkins; F. Jerkins III; Daniels; Tejeda | R. Jerkins; F. Jerkins III; Norwood^{[a]} | 4:51 |
| 12. | "In the Car Interlude" | | R. Jerkins | 1:10 |
| 13. | "Happy" | R. Jerkins; F. Jerkins III; Tejeda | R. Jerkins; Norwood^{[a]} | 4:06 |
| 14. | "One Voice" | Phil Galdston; Gordon Chambers | Foster | 4:08 |
| 15. | "Tomorrow" | Norwood; R. Jerkins; F. Jerkins III; Daniels; Tejeda | R. Jerkins; F. Jerkins III; Norwood^{[a]} | 5:21 |
| 16. | "(Everything I Do) I Do It for You" | Bryan Adams; Michael Kamen; Robert John Lange | Foster | 4:10 |
| Total length: | | | | 66:34 |

Never Say Never – Japanese edition (bonus track)
| No. | Title | Writer(s) | Producer(s) | Length |
|---|---|---|---|---|
| 17. | "The Boy Is Mine (Radio edit without intro)" (duet with Monica) | Norwood; Arnold; R. Jerkins; F. Jerkins III; Daniels; Japhe Tejeda | R. Jerkins; Austin; Norwood | 4:01 |
| Total length: | | | | 70:35 |

Never Say Never – Australian limited edition (bonus disc)
| No. | Title | Writer(s) | Producer(s) | Length |
|---|---|---|---|---|
| 1. | "Have You Ever (Soul Skank Remix)" | Warren | Foster; Soul Inside Productions 98^{[a]} | 3:59 |
| 2. | "Top of the World (Boogiesoul Remix Radio Edit)" | R. Jerkins; F. Jerkins III; Betha; Daniels; Phillips; Turman | R. Jerkins; Norwood^{[a]}; Boogieman^{[a]} | 3:53 |
| Total length: | | | | 7:52 |

Notes

- ^{^[a]} denotes additional producer

== Personnel ==
Credits adapted from the liner notes of Never Say Never.

- Anas Allaf – guitar
- Monica Arnold – lead vocals, backing vocals (Note: Monica was co-credited as a lead artist on "The Boy Is Mine"; the song was also included on her second studio album of the same title (1998).)
- Tom Bender – mixing assistance
- Chuckii Booker – drums
- Leslie Brathwaite – engineer
- Thomas Bricker – art director
- Alex Brown – backing vocals
- Gerry Brown – mixing
- Bridgette Bryant – backing vocals
- Carmen Carter – backing vocals
- Paris Davis – executive producer
- Ken Deranteriasian – engineer, mixing
- Nathan East – bass
- Felipe Elgueta – engineer
- David Foster – keyboard
- Brian Gardner – mastering
- Ben Garrison – engineer
- Brad Gilderman – engineer, mixing
- Nikisha Grierf – backing vocals
- Bernie Grundman – mastering
- Mick Guzauski – mixing
- Dorian Holley – backing vocals
- LaTonya Holman – backing vocals
- Jean-Marie Horvat – engineer
- Richard Jackson – backing vocals
- Bobette Jamison-Harrison – backing vocals
- Rodney Jerkins – executive producer
- Donyle Jones – backing vocals
- Craig Kallman – executive producer
- Vatrena King – backing vocals
- Mario Lucy – engineer
- Carlton Lynn – assistant engineer
- Harvey Mason, Jr. – keyboard
- Harvey Mason, Sr. – percussion
- Victor McCoy – engineer, assistant engineer
- James McCrary – backing vocals
- Kristle Murden – backing vocals
- Brandy Norwood – lead vocals, backing vocals, executive producer, engineer
- Willie Norwood – backing vocals
- Kayla Parker – backing vocals
- Dean Parks – guitar
- Shelly Peiken – backing vocals
- Isaac Phillips – guitar
- Al Schmitt – engineer
- Rick Sigel – engineer
- Alfie Silas – backing vocals
- Dexter Simmons – mixing
- Moana Suchard – engineer, assistant engineer
- Chris Tergesen – engineer
- Joseph Thomas – backing vocals
- Meri Thomas – backing vocals
- Greg Thompson – assistant engineer
- Michael Thompson – guitar
- Carmen Twillie – backing vocals
- Mervyn Warren – backing vocals
- Maxine Waters – backing vocals
- Oren Waters – backing vocals
- Rick Williams – guitar
- Yvonne Williams – backing vocals
- BeBe Winans – backing vocals
- Monalisa Young – backing vocals

== Charts ==
=== Weekly charts ===
Weekly chart performance for Never Say Never
| Chart (1998–1999) | Peak position |
|---|---|
| Australian Albums (ARIA) | 13 |
| Austrian Albums (Ö3 Austria) | 17 |
| Belgian Albums (Ultratop Flanders) | 21 |
| Canada Top Albums/CDs (RPM) | 3 |
| Canadian R&B Albums (SoundScan) | 1 |
| Dutch Albums (Album Top 100) | 5 |
| European Top 100 Albums (Music & Media) | 12 |
| French Albums (SNEP) | 12 |
| German Albums (Offizielle Top 100) | 10 |
| Japanese Albums (Oricon) | 14 |
| New Zealand Albums (RMNZ) | 16 |
| Norwegian Albums (VG-lista) | 25 |
| Scottish Albums (Official Charts) | 64 |
| Swedish Albums (Sverigetopplistan) | 15 |
| Swiss Albums (Schweizer Hitparade) | 11 |
| UK Albums (Official Charts) | 19 |
| UK R&B Albums (Official Charts) | 1 |
| US Billboard 200 | 2 |
| US Top R&B/Hip-Hop Albums (Billboard) | 2 |

=== Year-end charts ===
1998 year-end chart performance for Never Say Never
| Chart (1998) | Position |
|---|---|
| Canadian Albums (RPM) | 13 |
| Canadian Albums (SoundScan) | 18 |
| Canadian R&B Albums (SoundScan) | 1 |
| Dutch Albums (Album Top 100) | 64 |
| European Top 100 Albums (Music & Media) | 69 |
| French Albums (SNEP) | 59 |
| German Albums (Offizielle Top 100) | 55 |
| UK Albums (OCC) | 68 |
| US Billboard 200 | 29 |
| US Top R&B/Hip-Hop Albums (Billboard) | 18 |

1999 year-end chart performance for Never Say Never
| Chart (1999) | Position |
|---|---|
| Australian Albums (ARIA) | 95 |
| US Billboard 200 | 26 |
| US Top R&B/Hip-Hop Albums (Billboard) | 21 |

=== Decade-end charts ===
Decade-end chart performance for Never Say Never
| Chart (1990–1999) | Position |
|---|---|
| US Billboard 200 | 79 |

== Certifications and sales ==
Certifications for Never Say Never
| Region | Certification | Certified units/sales |
|---|---|---|
| Australia (ARIA) | Platinum | 70,000^{^} |
| Canada (Music Canada) | 4× Platinum | 400,000^{^} |
| France (SNEP) | Gold | 100,000^{*} |
| Ghana | — | 3,000 |
| Iceland | — | 3,294 |
| Japan (RIAJ) | Platinum | 200,000^{^} |
| Kenya | — | 6,500 |
| New Zealand (RMNZ) | Gold | 7,500^{^} |
| New Zealand (RMNZ) digital | Gold | 7,500^{‡} |
| United Kingdom (BPI) | Platinum | 300,000^{*} |
| United States (RIAA) | 5× Platinum | 4,600,000 |
^{*} Sales figures based on certification alone.^{^} Shipments figures based on certification alone.^{‡} Sales+streaming figures based on certification alone.

== Release history ==
Release dates and formats for Never Say Never
| Region | Date | Edition(s) | Format(s) | Label(s) | Ref. |
|---|---|---|---|---|---|
| France | June 4, 1998 | Standard | CD | Warner Music | |
| Germany | June 8, 1998 | Standard | CD | Warner Music | |
| United Kingdom | June 8, 1998 | Standard | CD | Atlantic | |
| Canada | June 9, 1998 | Standard | CD | Warner Music | |
| United States | June 9, 1998 | Standard | CD | Atlantic | |
| Japan | June 15, 1998 | Standard | CD | East West | |
| Australia | July 13, 1999 | Limited | Double CD | Warner Music | |

== See also ==
- Album era
- List of UK R&B Albums Chart number ones of 1998

== Bibliography ==
- Brackett, Nathan; Hoard, Christian David (2004). The New Rolling Stone Album Guide. Simon & Schuster. p. 103. ISBN 9780743201698 – via Internet Archive.
- Peiken, Shelly (March 1, 2016). Confessions of a Serial Songwriter. Backbeat Books. ISBN 9781495063619.
