= Isaac Phillips =

American songwriter

Isaac J. Phillips
- Genres: R&B; soul; hip-hop; gospel
- Occupations: Songwriter; producer; guitarist
- Label: Sipho Productions

Isaac Phillips is an American songwriter, producer, and guitarist, best known for his work with producer Rodney "Darkchild" Jerkins. Phillips has written for Whitney Houston and Brandy, among others.

== Songwriting and guitarist credits ==
Credits are courtesy of Discogs, Spotify and AllMusic.

Title	Year	Artist	Album
"Yeah! Yeah! Yeah!"	1997	Simone Hines	Simone Hines
"Top of the World" (Featuring Mase)	1998	Brandy	Never Say Never
"U Don't Know Me (Like U Used To)"	1998	Brandy	Never Say Never
"It's Not Right but It's Okay"	1998	Whitney Houston	My Love Is Your Love
"That's Why I Lie"	1998	Ray J	Dr. Dolittle OST
"She Wasn't Last Night"	1998	Jesse Powell	'Bout It
"I Never Knew"	1998	Deborah Cox	One Wish
"I Should Cheat On You"	1998	J'Son	Non-album single
"I Ain't Feelin You"	1999	Coko	Hot Coko
"When You Think Of Me"	1999	Eric Benét	A Day in the Life
"Love Of My Own"	1999	Eric Benét	A Day in the Life
"Yes"	2000	So Plush	So Plush
"He Loves Me"	2000	So Plush	So Plush
"Hatin' On Me"	2000	So Plush	So Plush
"You Be Alright"	2000	Musiq Soulchild	Aijuswanaseing
"Let Me Be"	2001	Britney Spears	Britney
"Lonely"	2001	Britney Spears	Britney
"Intimidated"	2001	Britney Spears	Jimmy Neutron: Boy Genius (Soundtrack)
"Take You High"	2002	Glenn Lewis	World Outside My Window
"Love/Hate"	2002	Kelly Rowland	Simply Deep
"When You Touch Me"	2002	Brandy	Full Moon
"Like This"	2002	Brandy	Full Moon
"Anybody"	2002	Brandy	Full Moon
"Emotional Rollercoaster"	2002	Vivian Green	A Love Story
"Cornbread, Fish & Collard Greens"	2003	Anthony Hamilton	Comin' from Where I'm From
"I Tried"	2003	Anthony Hamilton	Comin' from Where I'm From
"Afrodisiac"	2004	Brandy	Afrodisiac
"Focus"	2004	Brandy	Afrodisiac
"Sadiddy"	2004	Brandy	Afrodisiac
"Melody"	2005	Ray J	Raydiation
"Unbelievable"	2007	Sunshine Anderson	Sunshine at Midnight
"Alive"	2013	Jessie J	Alive
"Tell Me" (Featuring Kojo Funds & Jahlani)	2017	Wretch 32	FR32
"Love Me Like This" (Featuring Maia Wright)	2021	Tinie Tempah	Non-album single
"Rather Be Alone"	2022	Shane Codd	Non-album single
"Okay (It's Not Right)" (Featuring Oxlade & Pheelz)	2022	Whitney Houston	Whitney: New, Classic and Reimagined
"Tears" (With Joker and Sleepn)	2023	Skrillex	Quest for Fire
"Sittin' on Top of the World" (Featuring 21 Savage)	2023	Burna Boy	I Told Them...
"Tears Lost Drop" (With Joker and Sleepn)	2025	Skrillex	Fuck U Skrillex You Think Ur Andy Warhol but Ur Not!!
"Jungundra"	2025	Skrillex	Fuck U Skrillex You Think Ur Andy Warhol but Ur Not!!

== Awards and nominations ==
Year	Ceremony	Award	Result	Ref
2000	42nd Annual Grammy Awards	Best R&B Song (It's Not Right but It's Okay)	Nominated	
2023	2023 Soul Train Music Awards	Ashford & Simpson Songwriter's Award (Sittin' on Top of the World)	Nominated	
2024	ASCAP Rhythm & Soul Awards	Most Performed R&B/Hip-Hop Songs (Sittin' on Top of the World)	Won	
