= U Don't Know Me (Like U Used To) =

Single by Brandy

from the album Never Say Never
- Released: September 14, 1999
- Recorded: 1998 – July 12, 1999
- Studio: Enterprise (Burbank, California); Pacifique (North Hollywood, California)
- Genre: Electrohop
- Length: 4:29
- Label: Atlantic
- Songwriters: Brandy Norwood; Rodney Jerkins; Isaac Phillips; Paris Davis; Sean Bryant
- Producer: Rodney Jerkins

Brandy singles chronology
"Almost Doesn't Count" (1999)	"U Don't Know Me (Like U Used To)" (1999)	"(Everything I Do) I Do It for You" (1999)

Music video
- "U Don't Know Me (Like U Used To)" on YouTube

"U Don't Know Me (Like U Used To)" is a song by American recording artist Brandy. It was written by Isaac Phillips, Paris Davis, Sean Bryant, Rodney "Darkchild" Jerkins, and Brandy for her second studio album, Never Say Never (1998). Production was handled by Jerkins, with additional production from Brandy.

The song was released as the album's fifth single from Never Say Never in September 1999. The track peaked at number 79 on the US Billboard Hot 100 and number 25 on the Hot R&B Singles & Tracks chart, also reaching the top 20 of the UK Dance Singles and UK R&B Singles charts. A remix version of the track featuring female rappers Shaunta and Da Brat was accompanied by a remix EP entitled U Don't Know Me... Like U Used to – The Remix EP and a second music video, directed by Martin Weisz, featuring alternative visuals.

== Critical reception ==
Billboard editor Chuck Taylor called "U Don't Know Me (Like U Used To)" a "summery, you-can-sing-along-with-the-hook record." He compared it favorably to Brandy's debut single "I Wanna Be Down," calling it "hypnotic," and found that her "rougher-than-usual vocals styles at times even sound like Mary J. Blige." Da’Shan Smith from Revolt declared the song one of Never Say Never's "outstanding cuts" and found that it recalls "the '94 days of Brandy, but elevated it for the '98 present and subsequent future."

== Music video ==
A music video for "U Don't Know Me (Like U Used To)" was filmed by German director Martin Weisz. A Matrix-themed clip, it begins with people walking in front of a building and later on a sidewalk. They pause periodically and speed up as Brandy sings. Weisz also directed a video for the remix version of the song, featuring Brandy, Shaunta, and Da Brat singing as people walk by on a pedestrian walk.

== Track listings ==
US CD single
No.	Title	Length
1.	"U Don't Know Me (Like U Used To)" (remix radio edit)	4:03
2.	"U Don't Know Me (Like U Used To)" (album version)	4:29
3.	"U Don't Know Me (Like U Used To)" (remix instrumental)	4:05

International CD single
No.	Title	Length
1.	"Never Say Never" (Jazz Animal Remix)	4:25
2.	"U Don't Know Me (Like U Used To)" (remix)	3:59
3.	"U Don't Know Me (Like U Used To)" (album version)	4:27
4.	"Never Say Never" (album version)	5:09

== Personnel ==
Personnel are lifted from the album's liner notes.

- Brandy Norwood – writing, lead vocals, additional production
- Rodney Jerkins – writing, all music, production
- Sean Bryant – writing
- Paris Davis – writing
- Isaac Phillips – writing
- LaShawn Daniels – recording
- Brad Gilderman – recording
- Victor McCoy – recording
- Dexter Simmons – mixing

== Charts ==
Chart (1999)	Peak position
UK Singles (OCC)	180
UK Dance (OCC)	13
UK Hip Hop/R&B (OCC)	19
US Billboard Hot 100	79
US Hot R&B/Hip-Hop Songs (Billboard)	25

== Release history ==
Region	Date	Format(s)	Label	Ref.
United States	September 14, 1999	Rhythmic contemporary; urban; urban adult contemporary radio	Atlantic	
United Kingdom	November 8, 1999	CD; cassette	Atlantic	
