= Never Say Never World Tour =

1999 concert tour by Brandy

- Tour by Brandy
- Associated album: Never Say Never
- Start date: May 23, 1999
- End date: July 6, 1999
- Legs: 3
- No. of shows: 9 in Europe; 4 in Asia; 12 in North America; 25 total

Brandy concert chronology
- Never Say Never World Tour (1999); Human World Tour (2009)

The Never Say Never World Tour was the first concert tour by American R&B singer Brandy to support her second studio album, Never Say Never. The tour became Norwood's first world tour, reaching North America, Asia, and Europe. The tour began in Paris, France, on May 23, 1999; However the American leg of the tour concluded earlier than expected on July 6 due to Brandy's obligations of filming Moesha.

Her showcase in Illinois on July 7th was also taped, and aired later that year in December on UPN, entitled "Brandy in Concert: A Special for the Holidays". The June 10th show at the Shibuya Public Hall in Tokyo, Japan; was filmed and aired exclusively on WOWOW. The special was titled, "Brandy: Live in Japan 1999".

== Crew ==
- Keyboard: Eric Daniels, Stan Jones
- Percussion: Ebenezer DaSilva
- Bass: Ethan Farmer
- Drums: Jaime Gamble
- Guitar: Glenn McKinney
- Backing vocals: Gromyko Collins, Demetrice O’Neal
- Dancers: Denosh Bennett, Edwin Morales, Leticia Roman, Lamar Tribble, Robert Vinson, Lejon Walker, Earl Wright, Russel Wright
- Tour Manager: Fred Kharazi
- Production Manager: Mike Carter
- Lighting Director: John Labbriola
- Drum Tech: John Lopez
- Hair & Makeup: Kanika Morgan
- FOH Sound Engineer: Elliot Peters
- Programmer: Steve Lu
- Monitor Engineer: Mike Mule
- Wardrobe: Barbie Baptist

== Opening acts ==
- Tyrese (North America, select dates)
- Silk (North America, select dates)
- C-Note (North America, select dates)
- 702 (North America, select dates)

== Set list ==
This set list is from the concert in Holmdel, NJ on June 20, 1999.

1. "Overture (contains elements of “Never Say Never”)"
2. "Happy"
3. "Baby"
4. "I Wanna Be Down"
5. "Sittin’ Up in My Room"
6. "Best Friend"
7. "Angel in Disguise"
8. "U Don’t Know Me (Like U Used To)"
9. "Have You Ever?"
10. "Almost Doesn’t Count"
11. "Never Say Never"
12. "Learn the Hard Way"
13. "Top of the World"
14. "The Boy Is Mine"
15. "(Everything I Do) I Do It for You"

== Tour dates ==
Date	City	Country	Venue
Europe
May 23, 1999	Paris	France	Palais des Sports
May 24, 1999	Paris	France	Palais des Sports
May 26, 1999	Munich	Germany	Zenith die Kulturhalle
May 27, 1999	Berlin	Germany	Arena Berlin
May 28, 1999	Hamburg	Germany	Große Freiheit 36
May 29, 1999	London	England	Royal Albert Hall
May 30, 1999	Utrecht	Netherlands	Muziekcentrum Vredenburg
June 1, 1999	London	England	Hammersmith Apollo
June 2, 1999	London	England	Hammersmith Apollo
Asia
June 7, 1999	Tokyo	Japan	Shibuya Public Hall
June 10, 1999	Tokyo	Japan	Shibuya Public Hall
June 12, 1999	Yokohama	Japan	Kanagawa Prefectural Civic Hall
June 14, 1999	Osaka	Japan	Kōsei Nenkin Kaikan
North America
June 18, 1999	Camden	United States	Blockbuster-Sony Music Entertainment Centre
June 19, 1999	Wallingford	United States	SNET Oakdale Theatre
June 20, 1999	Holmdel Township	United States	PNC Bank Arts Center
June 23, 1999	Wantagh	United States	Jones Beach Amphitheater
June 25, 1999	Mansfield	United States	Tweeter Center for the Performing Arts
June 26, 1999	Columbia	United States	Merriweather Post Pavilion
June 27, 1999	Raleigh	United States	Alltel Pavilion
June 30, 1999	Cincinnati	United States	Riverbend Music Center
July 1, 1999^{[A]}	Milwaukee	United States	Marcus Amphitheater
July 2, 1999	Detroit	United States	Joe Louis Arena
July 3, 1999	Cleveland	United States	CSU Convocation Center
July 6, 1999	Rosemont	United States	Rosemont Theatre

Festivals and other miscellaneous performances
^{A} This concert was a part of "Summerfest"

Cancellations and rescheduled shows

July 7, 1999	Rosemont, Illinois	Rosemont Theatre	Cancelled
July 9, 1999	Maryland Heights, Missouri	Riverport Amphitheatre	Cancelled
July 10, 1999	Bonner Springs, Kansas	Sandstone Amphitheater	Cancelled
July 11, 1999	Noblesville, Indiana	Deer Creek Music Center	Cancelled
July 13, 1999	Columbus, Ohio	Polaris Amphitheater	Cancelled
July 14, 1999	Grand Rapids, Michigan	Van Andel Arena	Cancelled
July 15, 1999	Burgettstown, Pennsylvania	Coca-Cola Star Lake Amphitheater	Cancelled
July 16, 1999	Charlotte, North Carolina	Blockbuster Pavilion	Cancelled
July 17, 1999	Virginia Beach, Virginia	Virginia Beach Pavilion Theater	Cancelled
July 19, 1999	Atlanta, Georgia	Chastain Park Amphitheater	Cancelled
July 20, 1999	Birmingham, Alabama	Boutwell Memorial Auditorium	Cancelled
July 21, 1999	West Palm Beach, Florida	Coral Sky Amphitheater	Cancelled
July 23, 1999	Memphis, Tennessee	Mud Island Amphitheatre	Cancelled
July 24, 1999	New Orleans, Louisiana	Lakefront Arena	Cancelled
July 25, 1999	The Woodlands, Texas	Cynthia Woods Mitchell Pavilion	Cancelled
July 27, 1999	Dallas, Texas	Starplex Amphitheatre	Cancelled
July 29, 1999	Concord, California	Concord Pavilion	Cancelled
July 30, 1999	Irvine, California	Irvine Meadows Amphitheatre	Cancelled
July 31, 1999	Phoenix, Arizona	Blockbuster Desert Sky Pavilion	Cancelled
August 2, 1999	Paso Robles, California	Mid-State Fair Main Grandstand	Cancelled This concert was a part of the "California Mid-State Fair".
