= The Boy Is Mine (Brandy and Monica song) =

1998 duet single by Brandy and Monica

Single by Brandy and Monica

from the album Never Say Never and The Boy Is Mine
- Released: May 4, 1998
- Recorded: October 1997
- Studio: Record One (Los Angeles); DARP (Atlanta, Georgia)
- Genre: R&B
- Length: 4:54 (album version); 4:03 (radio version)
- Label: Atlantic
- Songwriters: Brandy Norwood; LaShawn Daniels; Rodney Jerkins; Fred Jerkins III; Japhe Tejeda
- Producers: Darkchild; Brandy; Dallas Austin

Brandy singles chronology
"Missing You" (1996)	"The Boy Is Mine" (1998)	"Top of the World" (1998)

Monica singles chronology
"For You I Will" (1997)	"The Boy Is Mine" (1998)	"The First Night" (1998)

Music video
- "The Boy Is Mine" on YouTube

"The Boy Is Mine" is a duet by the American singers Brandy and Monica. It was written by Brandy, LaShawn Daniels, Japhe Tejeda, Fred Jerkins III and Rodney "Darkchild" Jerkins, while production was helmed by Jerkins and Dallas Austin. It was released as the lead single from both singers' second albums from 1998, Never Say Never by Brandy and the album The Boy Is Mine by Monica. The lyrics of the mid-tempo R&B track revolve around two women fighting over a man, with critics comparing it to Michael Jackson and Paul McCartney's 1982 duet "The Girl Is Mine."

The song received generally positive reviews from music critics and was the first number-one pop hit for both artists, in the US and internationally. Exploiting the media's presumption of a rivalry between the two young singers, "The Boy Is Mine" became the best-selling song of the year in the US, selling 2.6 million copies, and spending 13 weeks at the top of the US Billboard Hot 100. Internationally, the single peaked at number one in Canada, the Netherlands and New Zealand, while reaching the top five on most of the other charts on which it appeared.

The accompanying music video, directed by Joseph Kahn, starred the singers and Mekhi Phifer. It was nominated for two MTV Video Music Awards, including Video of the Year and Best R&B Video. In addition, "The Boy Is Mine" was awarded the Grammy Award for Best R&B Vocal Performance by a Duo or Group and received nominations for both Record of the Year and Best R&B Song in 1999. Billboard named it the Hot 100 Sales Single of Year and also listed it 54th on its 50th Anniversary All-Time Hot 100 Top Songs chart, as well as 18th on the All-Time Top R&B/Hip-Hop Songs countdown. The singers reunited on the 2012 single "It All Belongs to Me" and the remix of American singer Ariana Grande's identically titled 2024 single "The Boy Is Mine".

== Background ==
"The Boy Is Mine" was a song Brandy wrote with Rodney "Darkchild" Jerkins, his brother Fred Jerkins III, Japhe Tejeda, and LaShawn Daniels during early recording sessions for her second album, Never Say Never. The singer came up with its concept while watching an episode of The Jerry Springer Show tabloid talk show, where love triangles among the guests was the theme. Initially conceived as a solo recording, Brandy recorded the track alone. However, upon reviewing the original, comparatively stripped-down version, both she and Jerkins concluded that the composition would be more effective as a duet. At Brandy's request, her label Atlantic Records approached fellow R&B teen singer Monica to participate in the project. The pair had seen each other in passing at award shows and other live events, and Brandy thought a duet would help combat ongoing rumors that the singers were rivals. Despite opposition from her management, who expressed concern that such a collaboration might exacerbate the alleged feud, Monica ultimately agreed to contribute to the track with the approval of Clive Davis, then head of Monica's record company Arista Records.

The artists initially recorded their vocals together with Jerkins and Daniels following a visit to a Six Flags amusement park near Atlanta, where they had spent time becoming better acquainted. Prior to the session, Jerkins revised the track, most notably increasing its tempo, while reproducing it in his parents' New Jersey basement, where he constructed the instrumental using an Akai MPC60 for the bass and drum patterns and a keyboard set to a harp tone for the song's opening motif. While some critics suggested that the song was inspired by Michael Jackson and Paul McCartney's duet "The Girl Is Mine", Jerkins has denied that neither the music nor the lyrics of "The Boy Is Mine" were conceived with that track in mind, stating that they only recognized the similarity in their themes after the recordings were completed. Although the initial joint recording session was completed successfully, Monica later chose to re-record her vocals independently with her frequent collaborator Dallas Austin, citing a desire to temper her performance due to the strength of her voice. The decision initially disappointed Brandy, who felt their joint session version had been particularly cohesive and special, though she later acknowledged that Monica's revised performance provided a stronger counterbalance to her own "measured delivery." As a result of his work on Monica's vocal production, Austin later received a producer credit on "The Boy Is Mine."

Though both Brandy and Monica consistently denied that the song reflected any genuine rivalry between them, emphasizing that its intent was to convey the opposite, tabloid media often portrayed their collaboration as evidence of a feud. Fueled by media attention and label politics, their relationship reportedly became strained after Davis opted to take the name of the duet for the title of Monica's second album, a decision that Brandy perceived as a calculated move to assert ownership of the song. Monica, in turn, was allegedly upset when Brandy performed the song solo on The Tonight Show with Jay Leno after scheduling conflicts prevented her from appearing. Following reports that the pair had come to blows during a rehearsal for a performance at the MTV Video Music Awards in September 1998, discussion of the supposed rivalry intensified, prompting the singers' managers to issue a joint statement condemning the press for its "disturbing behavior" and describing the ongoing negativity as "totally unfair." In fact, their relationship reportedly mended somewhat after their shared performance, leading the two to attend the 41st Annual Grammy Awards together. Jerkins later confirmed that both singers "didn’t get along" during production and that he and Dexter Simmons remixed the track seven times to maintain balance. In a 2012 interview with WZMX, Monica reflected on her past relationship with Brandy, stating, "We were young. We could barely stay in the room with each other. By no means was it jealousy or envy. She and I are polar opposites, and instead of embracing that, we used our differences as reasons not to be amongst each other."

== Composition ==
"The Boy Is Mine"
25 second sample to "The Boy Is Mine" featuring the second chorus that has Monica performing the ad-libs.

"The Boy Is Mine" was written by Brandy Norwood, LaShawn Daniels, Japhe Tejeda, Fred Jerkins III, and his brother Rodney "Darkchild" Jerkins. Musically, the song has been described as "R&B-pop." Written in thirty-two-bar form, "The Boy Is Mine" starts off with a twinkling yet stormy synthesized harp line, produced through the harp setting of a keyboard. When the two protagonists initiate a conversation that depicts their first meeting as rivals, the track adds a pulsing beat and a countermelody of cello strings before the chorus kicks in. Similar to McCartney and Jackson's "The Girl Is Mine", Jerkins and his team structured "The Boy Is Mine" with spaces. During the constructing of the lyrics, they settled on a call and response form, giving each singer two bars a piece to sing.

According to the sheet music published at Musicnotes.com by Sony/ATV Music Publishing, the song is set in the time signature of common time, with a tempo of 93 beats per minute. It is written in the key of C♯ minor, and it follows a chord progression of F♯m9–C♯m9, and the vocals span from C♯_{3} to E_{5}. The song's lyrics chronicle a catfight between two young women who try to convince each other that they are the object of a man's affection. On the track, each trades increasingly escalating remarks about how the other must be mistaken, jealous or delusional about her importance to the man in question. The chorus runs as follows: "You need to give it up, had about enough, it's not hard to see, the boy is mine." Critics noted that the lyrics almost take on the heated fell of a political debate or even a reality show."

== Critical reception ==
The song has garnered positive reviews from critics and fans. AllMusic editor Stephen Thomas Erlewine ranked the duet among the best songs on both album, Never Say Never (1998) and The Boy Is Mine (1998). Larry Flick from Billboard called it a "surprisingly subdued, ultimately sleek and soulful jam." He added, "Joined by fellow jeep ingénue Monica, TV's "Moesha" reveals a markedly matured style and a far more flexible range. Meanwhile, Monica whets appetites for her own forthcoming disc with a deliciously diva-driven performance that is rife with subtext." He complimented the producers for dressing the singers in "plush synths and quietly insinuating beats that will have seasoned listeners reminiscing about the heyday of Barry White and the Love Unlimited Orchestra. This isn't the obviously poppy or immediately infectious single one might have expected as the preview to Brandy's new disc, but after a second spin, you won't be able to shake the subtle hook from your brain." Entertainment Weekly's J.D. Considine felt that "there's none of the soul-baring theatrics we'd get if Faith Evans and Mary J. Blige had gone at it. Instead, the two younger women play second fiddle to the steady-thumping bass, keeping their voices so low you'd think they were afraid a teacher might overhear them."

In a different review for Entertainment Weekly, Matt Diehl wrote, "No, this isn't an estrogen flip on the Michael Jackson hit. Nor is it the soul-sista catfight that the pairing of these teen-dream divas-in-training promised (the too-silky production delivers a TKO to any gritty R&B tension). Still, child star Brandy sings like a woman for the first time, making her potential for an adult career à la Toni Braxton a distinct possibility." Lorraine Ali, writing for Rolling Stone, complimented Jerkins' production for its "sweeping orchestration." Craig Seymour from The Village Voice said that the song "creeps up on you with a harp sound that's like light twinkling on a reflective pool." He found that "You don't groove to it so much as you vibe in it, as Brandy and Monica kick a rather standard script [...] in their surprisingly complementary styles. Brandy is to groove what Monica is to rhythm. Where Brandy rides the contour of a melody like a wave, Monica advances and recedes, spontaneously creating then dismissing parallel rhythms."

== Chart performance and impact ==
On June 5, 1998, "The Boy Is Mine" became both singers' first number-one hit and fifth top-10 entry for each on the US Billboard Hot 100. Bouncing from number 23 to the number-one spot, Billboard noted that it was very unusual for a single to ascend directly to number one from a previous position beneath the top 20. In addition, it was the first number-one collaboration between solo women since 1979's "No More Tears (Enough Is Enough)," performed by Barbra Streisand and Donna Summer. The same week, "The Boy Is Mine" also moved to number one on the Hot R&B Singles and Maxi-Singles Sales charts. On the Maxi-Singles Sales chart, it spent 21 weeks at number one, setting the record for most weeks at number one until Nine Inch Nails spent 36 weeks at number one with "Every Day Is Exactly the Same" throughout 2006, 2007, and 2008. Within the first month of its purchasable release, "The Boy Is Mine" went on to sell 605,000 units. It spent 13 consecutive weeks atop the Billboard Hot 100 and was, at the time, the third-longest running number-one song in US chart history, sharing this record with Boyz II Men's "End of the Road" (1992). "The Boy Is Mine" was the best-selling single of 1998 in the US, with sales of 2.6 million. It was certified double Platinum by the Recording Industry Association of America (RIAA) and was ranked eighth on Billboard's Decade-End Charts.

Outside the US, "The Boy Is Mine" reached the top 10 in over 14 countries and topped the chart in Canada, the Netherlands and New Zealand. In Canada, the song debuted on the RPM 100 Hit Tracks chart at number 74 on the RPM issue dated June 1, 1998, and reached the top spot of the chart on August 21, 1998. It was present on the chart for a total of 45 weeks. It reached the top two in Belgium, France, Ireland, Norway, and the United Kingdom; the top five in Australia, Germany, Sweden, and Switzerland; and the top 10 in Austria and Italy.

== Awards and recognitions ==
The single won many awards throughout 1998 and 1999. It was nominated for three Grammy Awards at the 41st annual ceremony, winning both singers their first prize by the National Academy of Recording Arts and Sciences in the Best R&B Performance by a Duo or Group with Vocals category. It, however, lost in its nominations for Record of the Year and Best R&B Song to Celine Dion's "My Heart Will Go On" and Lauryn Hill's "Doo Wop (That Thing)" respectively. The song garnered three Billboard Music Awards.

It was listed as number 55 of the Hot 100 singles of all time by Billboard in 1998. This position was raised to number 54 in 2008. In addition, it was listed 18th on the All-Time Top R&B/Hip-Hop Songs countdown. In 2008, Billboard ranked the song third on a special The 40 Biggest Duets of All Time listing. The song is the best-selling song of 1998 in the United States with 4.5 million copies sold.

== Music video ==
A music video for "The Boy Is Mine" was directed by Joseph Kahn. Filmed in Los Angeles in April 1998, it uses 90-degree tilts to depict the drama and the playfulness between the two. Making its debut on April 22, 1998, it uses the radio edit of the song, removing the intro. It was nominated for two MTV Video Music Awards at the 1998 ceremony, including Best R&B Video and Video of the Year, but lost to both Wyclef Jean's "Gone Till November" and Madonna's "Ray of Light" respectively.

=== Synopsis ===
Brandy and Monica in the video for "The Boy Is Mine".

The video begins with Brandy watching an episode of The Jerry Springer Show. Next Monica who, using her remote, accidentally turns Brandy's TV along with her own to watch an old romantic movie. Confused, Brandy changes her channel back. Much to their dismay, whenever one of them turns the channel, the other's TV is also turned. They begin singing. The next scene shows the two discussing their problem among their separate groups of friends. The titular boy himself (played by Mekhi Phifer) then appears outside adjacent apartments, 6 and 7, where we later discover the two girls live; all their friends walk by him as they exit their respective friend's place. The girls are seen next arguing through their adjoining bedroom wall, until the boy phones them one after the other. They each overhear the other's conversation through the wall, realizing that they've both been played. They proceed to gather up all gifts and memorabilia related to the boy and toss them out the door. After Brandy and Monica sing more through the song's lyrics, the boy knocks on Brandy's door. The door opens showing Brandy for a brief moment before she opens the door wider to reveal Monica beside her. Noticing that he had been caught, the boy is taken aback, and the door is slammed in his face before he even gets a chance to talk to them, ending the video.

== Live performances ==
Brandy first performed the song by herself on The Tonight Show. Following that, she and Monica first performed it together at the 1998 MTV Video Music Awards in Los Angeles at the Gibson Amphitheatre on September 10, 1998, an event which remains, to date, Brandy and Monica's only television broadcast performance of the song. The pair came together a second time on December 16, 2008, for a surprise performance at Atlanta's V103 Soul Session, singing it a cappella.

In 2012, they performed the song with their new duet "It All Belongs To Me" at V-103's "Conversation/Soul Session".

== Accolades ==
Accolades for "The Boy Is Mine"
Accolade	Year	Rank
Bruce Pollock – The 7,500 Most Important Songs of 1944-2000	2005	—
(*) designates lists that are unordered.

== Track listings ==
US 12-inch single

A1. "The Boy Is Mine" (extended mix) – 7:40
A2. "The Boy Is Mine" (a cappella) – 4:30
B1. "The Boy Is Mine" (album version) – 4:52
B2. "The Boy Is Mine" (album instrumental) – 4:52

US and Canadian maxi-CD single

1. "The Boy Is Mine" (album version)
2. "The Boy Is Mine" (club mix)
3. "The Boy Is Mine" (radio with intro)
4. "The Boy Is Mine" (album instrumental)
5. "The Boy Is Mine" (a cappella)

US CD, 7-inch, and cassette single

1. "The Boy Is Mine" (radio edit with intro) – 4:00
2. "The Boy Is Mine" (instrumental) – 4:52

UK CD and 12-inch single, Australian CD single

1. "The Boy Is Mine" (radio edit without intro) – 4:00
2. "The Boy Is Mine" (radio edit with intro) – 4:00
3. "The Boy Is Mine" (LP version) – 4:51
4. "The Boy Is Mine" (club version) – 7:40

UK cassette single and European CD single

1. "The Boy Is Mine" (radio edit without intro) – 4:00
2. "The Boy Is Mine" (club version) – 7:40

== Credits and personnel ==
Credits are taken from the Never Say Never liner notes.

- Brandy Norwood – music production, songwriting, lead vocals, background vocals
- Monica Arnold – lead vocals, background vocals
- Dallas Austin – Monica's vocal production
- Leslie Brathwaite – recording engineer
- LaShawn Daniels – Brandy's vocal production, vocal arrangements, songwriting
- The Darkchild Orchestra – strings
- Ben Garrison – music recording
- Larry Gold – string arrangements
- Rodney Jerkins – music production, Brandy's vocal production, vocal arrangements, string arrangements, songwriting, mixing
- Carlton Lynn – engineering assistant
- Victor McCoy – engineering assistant
- Isaac Phillips – guitar
- Dexter Simmons – music recording, audio mixing
- Chris Tergesen – string section recording engineer
- Greg Thompson – engineering assistant

== Charts ==
=== Weekly charts ===
1998 weekly chart performance for "The Boy Is Mine"
Chart (1998)	Peak position
Australia (ARIA)	3
Austria (Ö3 Austria Top 40)	6
Belgium (Ultratop 50 Flanders)	4
Belgium (Ultratop 50 Wallonia)	2
Canada (Nielsen SoundScan)	1
Canada Top Singles (RPM)	1
Canada Dance (RPM)	1
Canada Urban (RPM)	1
Denmark (IFPI)	3
Europe (Eurochart Hot 100)	2
France (SNEP)	2
Germany (GfK)	5
Greece (IFPI Greece)	4
Iceland (Íslenski Listinn Topp 40)	2
Ireland (IRMA)	2
Italy (Musica e dischi)	10
Netherlands (Dutch Top 40)	1
Netherlands (Single Top 100)	1
New Zealand (Recorded Music NZ)	1
Norway (VG-lista)	2
Scottish Singles Sales (Official Charts)	22
Sweden (Sverigetopplistan)	3
Switzerland (Schweizer Hitparade)	3
UK Singles (Official Charts)	2
UK Dance (Official Charts)	7
UK Hip Hop/R&B (Official Charts)	1
US Billboard Hot 100	1
US Dance Singles Sales (Billboard)	1
US Hot R&B/Hip-Hop Songs (Billboard)	1
US Pop Airplay (Billboard)	3
US Rhythmic Airplay (Billboard)	1

2012 weekly chart performance for "The Boy Is Mine"
Chart (2012)	Peak position
UK Hip Hop/R&B (Official Charts)	36

=== Year-end charts ===
1998 year-end chart performance for "The Boy Is Mine"
Chart (1998)	Position
Australia (ARIA)	17
Austria (Ö3 Austria Top 40)	22
Belgium (Ultratop 50 Flanders)	35
Belgium (Ultratop 50 Wallonia)	10
Canada Top Singles (RPM)	7
Canada Dance (RPM)	7
Canada Urban (RPM)	1
Europe (Eurochart Hot 100)	9
France (SNEP)	5
Germany (Media Control)	17
Iceland (Íslenski Listinn Topp 40)	13
Netherlands (Dutch Top 40)	8
Netherlands (Single Top 100)	8
New Zealand (RIANZ)	3
Sweden (Hitlistan)	20
Switzerland (Schweizer Hitparade)	13
UK Singles (OCC)	18
UK Urban (Music Week)	10
US Billboard Hot 100	2
US Hot R&B Singles (Billboard)	3
US Mainstream Top 40 (Billboard)	19
US Maxi-Singles Sales (Billboard)	1
US Rhythmic Top 40 (Billboard)	3

1999 year-end chart performance for "The Boy Is Mine"
Chart (1999)	Position
US Maxi-Singles Sales (Billboard)	18

=== Decade-end charts ===
Decade-end chart performance for "The Boy Is Mine"
Chart (1990–1999)	Position
Canada (Nielsen SoundScan)	2
Netherlands (Dutch Top 40)	76
US Billboard Hot 100	8

=== All-time charts ===
All-time chart performance for "The Boy Is Mine"
Chart (1958–2018)	Position
US Billboard Hot 100	70

== Certifications and sales ==
Certifications for "The Boy Is Mine"
Region	Certification	Certified units/sales
Australia (ARIA)	Platinum	70,000^{^}
Belgium (BRMA)	Platinum	50,000^{*}
France (SNEP)	Platinum	500,000^{*}
Germany (BVMI)	Gold	250,000^{^}
Netherlands (NVPI)	Platinum	75,000^{^}
New Zealand (RMNZ)	2× Platinum	60,000^{‡}
Norway (IFPI Norway)	Gold	
Sweden (GLF)	Platinum	30,000^{^}
Switzerland (IFPI Switzerland)	Gold	25,000^{^}
United Kingdom (BPI)	2× Platinum	1,200,000
United States (RIAA)	2× Platinum	2,591,000
^{*} Sales figures based on certification alone.^{^} Shipments figures based on certification alone.^{‡} Sales+streaming figures based on certification alone.

== Release history ==
Release dates and formats for "The Boy Is Mine"
Region	Date	Format(s)	Label(s)	Ref(s).
United States	May 4, 1998	Urban contemporary radio	Atlantic	
United States	May 5, 1998	Rhythmic contemporary; contemporary hit radio	Atlantic	
United States	May 19, 1998	CD	Atlantic	
United Kingdom	May 25, 1998	12-inch vinyl; CD; cassette	Atlantic	
Japan	June 5, 1998	CD	Atlantic	
Germany	June 8, 1998	Maxi-CD	Atlantic	

== Cover versions and remixes ==
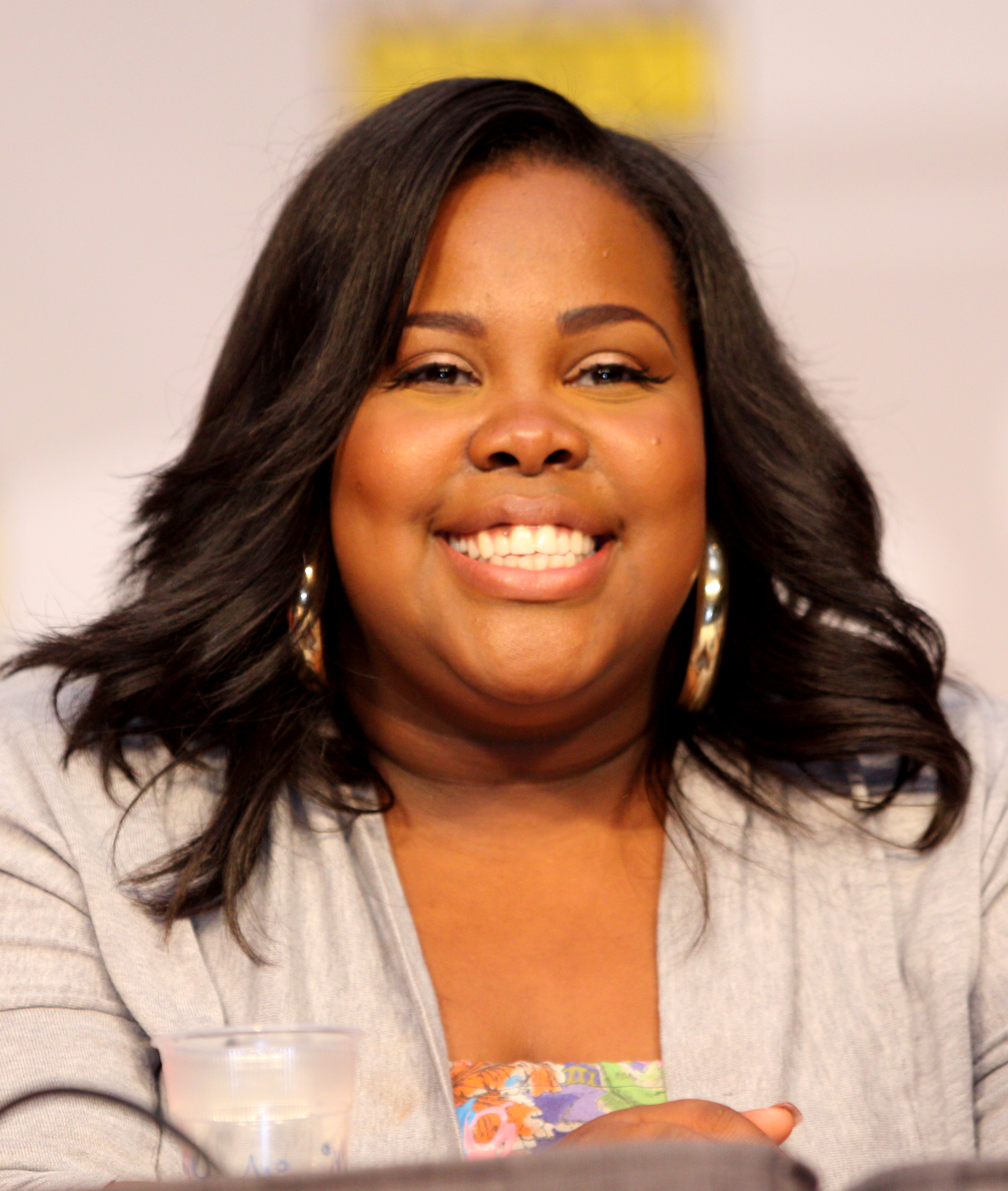
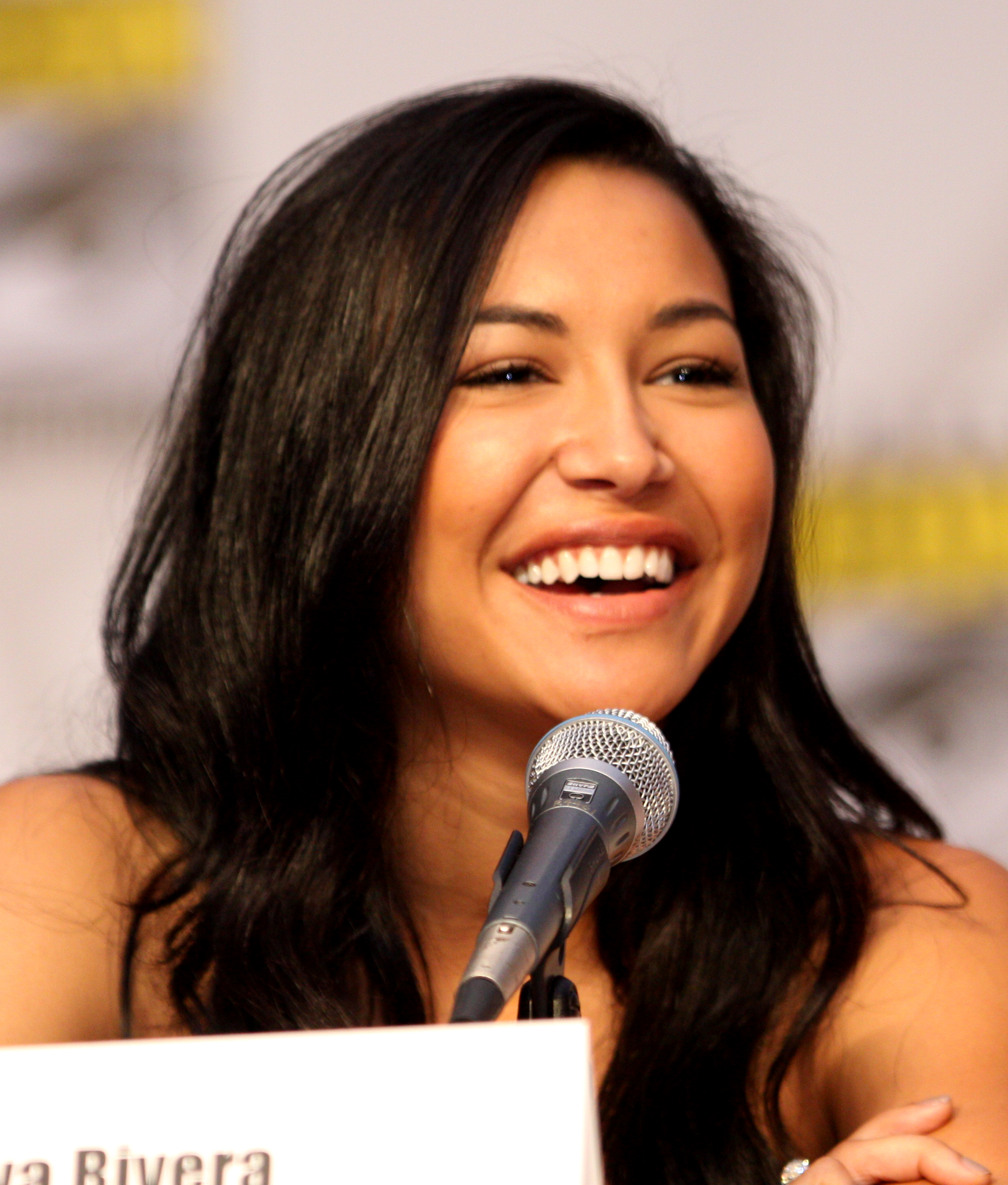
Riley as Mercedes (left) and Rivera as Santana (right) recorded a cover version of the song.
- In 1998, UK garage group Architechs remixed "The Boy Is Mine", and released it as a white label record which eventually sold 20,000 copies. This remix became highly popular due to incessant airplay on pirate radio.
- In 2001, Brandy and Monica's vocals were merged with Modjo's 2000 dance hit single "Lady (Hear Me Tonight)" by British DJs Stuntmasterz. Starting as an underground hit, "The Ladyboy Is Mine" was later commercially released to become a moderate hit across Europe, reaching the top 10 in the United Kingdom, Belgium and the top forty in France and Switzerland. The commercial release didn't include the vocal sample from Modjo's "Lady" as Warner Brothers label East West were unable to clear it. Instead the release used the same sample from Chic's "Soup for One" and created an alternate version that only featured Brandy and Monica.
- In 2009, Japanese singer BENI and American singer Tynisha Keli covered this song.
- The song was covered in 2010 by Amber Riley and Naya Rivera for the TV show Glee as their respective characters, Mercedes Jones and Santana Lopez. Their version hit number 76 on the Billboard Hot 100.
- In 2014, the British production duo 99 Souls made a house music mash-up called "The Girl Is Mine", which used the record alongside "Girl" by Destiny's Child. After the duo got official approvals from the singers involved, the duo released the record via RCA Records in 2015 with a re-recorded vocal by Brandy (but not Monica), resulting in a Top 5 position in the Official Charts' UK Singles listings.
- In 2018, Postmodern Jukebox released a 1940s vintage cover of the song, starring the sisters Emily and Juliette Goglia. The YouTube video has received 1.6 million views as of December 21, 2020.
- On the October 14, 2019, episode of reality television singing competition show The Voice, Team (John) Legend members Khalea Lynee of St. Petersburg, Florida, and Zoe Upkins of Nashville, Tennessee, performed the song in a Battle round. Coaches Kelly Clarkson, Gwen Stefani, and Blake Shelton were all divided, with Stefani preferring Upkins's performance, Shelton preferring Lynee's performance, and Clarkson abstaining from naming her preference. Legend chose to agree with Shelton and named Lynee the winner of the Battle, advancing her to the Knockout rounds. Soon after, Legend also attempted to save Upkins and keep her on his team, as well, although Clarkson and Stefani both attempted to steal her instead, with the three coaches' attempts saving her from elimination regardless of her choice. Ultimately, Upkins opted to remain on Team Legend, advancing to the Knockouts on his team.
- In August 2024, British girlgroup FLO covered the song in a mash up with the 2024 single The Boy is Mine for BBC Radio 1Xtra's Live Lounge.
- In September 2024, Audrey Nuna sampled and interpolated the song with her single 'Mine' off her sophomore album 'Trench'.

=== Weekly charts ===
2010 weekly chart performance for Glee's cover of "The Boy Is Mine"
Chart (2010)	Peak position
Australia (ARIA)	97
Canada Hot 100 (Billboard)	60
Ireland (IRMA)	46
Scottish Singles Sales (Official Charts)	50
UK Singles (Official Charts)	62
US Billboard Hot 100	76

== See also ==
- List of Billboard Hot 100 chart achievements and milestones
- List of Hot 100 number-one singles of 1998 (U.S.)
