= Fred Jerkins III =

- Also known as: Uncle Freddie
- Genres: R&B, gospel
- Occupation(s): Songwriter, record producer

Fred Jerkins III, also known as Uncle Freddie, is an American songwriter and record producer.

== Career ==
Jerkins is best known for his work with his brother Rodney "Darkchild" Jerkins. Jerkins has co-written several hit songs with Rodney Jerkins and LaShawn Daniels, among them "The Boy Is Mine" by Brandy and Monica, "Say My Name" and "Lose My Breath" by Destiny's Child, "It's Not Right but It's Okay" by Whitney Houston, "He Wasn't Man Enough" by Toni Braxton, and multiple tracks from Michael Jackson's album Invincible. He has also produced a number of songs under the Darkchild imprint for artists such as Brandy, Shola Ama, Men of Vizion, Keith Washington, and JoJo.

On his own, Jerkins is a noted producer of gospel music. He and his family are residents of Atlanta, Georgia.

=== Production ===
Jerkins has written or produced for Brandy, Michael Jackson, Beyoncé, Toni Braxton, Jessica Simpson, Jennifer Lopez, Aaliyah, Mary Mary, Destiny's Child, Spice Girls, Mel B, Shola Ama, TLC, Will Smith, Janet Jackson, Whitney Houston, Mary J. Blige, Men of Vizion, Keith Washington, Lionel Richie, Kirk Franklin, Kierra Sheard, Virtue, Papa San, Trin-i-tee 5:7 and Deitrick Haddon.

== Awards ==
- Grammy Award for Best R&B Song – "Say My Name" By Destiny's Child.
- Dove Award for Urban Album of the Year – "Church on the Moon" By Deitrick Haddon.
- Dove Award for Urban Album of the Year – "This Is Me" By Kierra "Kiki" Sheard.
- Dove Award for Urban Recorded Song of the Year – "You Don’t Know" By Kierra "Kiki" Sheard.
