= Pacifique Recording Studios =

Recording studio

Coordinates: 34.1647°N 118.3622°W

Pacifique Recording Studios is a mixing and recording studio based in North Hollywood, California that was launched by Joe, Ken, and Vic Deranteriassian in 1984. In 1999, Pacifique installed its second SSL console, the 9000 J Series. In 2003, Pacifique housed two SSL K 9000 (96 input) consoles, which is still sought after by engineers and artists who prefer analog boards over digital ones. Pacifique has been featured in Billboard, Mix, and Audio magazines for its mixing and recording achievements over the past 25 years. The company sold to new ownership in late 2015.

== List of gold/platinum albums recorded or mixed at Pacifique ==
- Trompe le Monde (Pixies, 1991)
- Unforgettable… with Love (Natalie Cole, 1991)
- Big Willie Style (Will Smith, 1997)
- Men in Black: The Album (1997)
- Never Say Never (Brandy, 1998)
- Cosas del Amor (Enrique Iglesias, 1998)
- Mi respuesta (Laura Pausini, 1998)
- Christina Aguilera (Christina Aguilera, 1999)
- The Writing's on the Wall (Destiny's Child, 1999)
- On the 6 (Jennifer Lopez, 1999)
- Amarte Es Un Placer (Luis Miguel, 1999)
- It Was All a Dream (Dream, 2001)
- Aaliyah (Aaliyah, 2001)
- Karma (Tarkan, 2001)
- In the Zone (Britney Spears, 2003)
- Musicology (Prince, 2004)
- Oral Fixation Vol. 2 (Shakira, 2005)
- The Dutchess (Fergie, 2006)
- Shock Value (Timbaland, 2007)
- Curtis (50 Cent, 2007)
- 808s & Heartbreak (Kanye West, 2008)
- Paper Trail (T.I., 2008)
- Before I Self Destruct (50 Cent, 2009)
- Lemonade (Beyoncé, 2016)

== Notable clients ==
- 50 Cent
- Aaliyah
- Ameriie
- André 3000
- B2K
- Beyoncé
- The Black Eyed Peas
- Bone Thugs-n-Harmony
- Bow Wow
- Boyz II Men
- Britney Spears
- Busta Rhymes
- Cee Lo Green
- Ciara
- Chamillionaire
- Chingy
- Christina Aguilera
- Common
- D'Angelo
- Destiny's Child
- Dr. Dre
- Duffy
- Enrique Iglesias
- Eric Benét
- Erykah Badu
- Eve
- Fergie (singer)
- The Game
- G-Unit
- Green Day
- Immature
- Jennifer Lopez
- John Legend
- JoJo
- Joss Stone
- Justin Timberlake
- Juvenile
- Kanye West
- Kelis
- Kelly Rowland
- Laura Pausini
- Lil Wayne
- LL Cool J
- Luis Miguel
- Lupe Fiasco
- Marques Houston
- Mary J. Blige
- Mos Def
- Mýa
- Nas
- Natalie Cole
- Natasha Bedingfield
- Ne-Yo
- New Boyz
- 98 Degrees
- Omarion
- Pussycat Dolls
- Prince
- Queen Latifah
- Ray J
- Redman
- Rihanna
- Rodney Jerkins
- Ron Fair
- Seal
- Scott Storch
- Shakira
- Shania Twain
- Sisqó
- Snoop Dogg
- Stevie Wonder
- Soulja Boy
- Tarkan
- Tatyana Ali
- Taylor Dayne
- T.I.
- Toni Braxton
- Toto
- Tricky Stewart
- Warren G
- will.i.am
- Will Smith
- Wyclef Jean
- Xzibit
- Young Jeezy
