= Greatest Hits (Evelyn "Champagne" King album) =

Evelyn "Champagne" King: Greatest Hits

Greatest hits album by Evelyn "Champagne" King
- Released: 2001
- Recorded: 1977–2001
- Genres: Disco; soul; post-disco
- Label: BMG

Evelyn "Champagne" King chronology
Let's Get Funky (1997)	Evelyn "Champagne" King: Greatest Hits (2001)	Platinum & Gold Collection (2003)

Greatest Hits contains some of Evelyn "Champagne" King's biggest hits, including "Shame," "I Don't Know If It's Right," "Love Come Down" and "I'm in Love". Other hits, such as "Get Loose," "I'm So Romantic" and "Give Me One Reason", are not included.

== Track listing ==
1. "Shame" (12" version)
2. "I Don't Know If It's Right" (7" version)
3. "Music Box" (12" version)
4. "Out There" (7" version)
5. "Let's Get Funky Tonight"
6. "I'm in Love" (12" version)
7. "Don't Hide Our Love" (7" version)
8. "Spirit of the Dancer"
9. "Love Come Down" (12" version)
10. "Betcha She Don't Love You" (12" version)
11. "Action"
12. "Shake Down"
13. "Teenager"
14. "Just for the Night" (12" version)
15. "Out of Control"
16. "Till Midnight"
17. "Your Personal Touch" (Dance Version)
18. "High Horse"
