= Love Come Down: The Best of Evelyn "Champagne" King =

Greatest hits album by Evelyn "Champagne" King
- Released: March 23, 1993
- Recorded: 1977–1993
- Genres: R&B; disco; pop; soul; post-disco
- Length: 65:22
- Label: RCA

Evelyn "Champagne" King chronology
The Best of Evelyn "Champagne" King (1990)	Love Come Down: The Best of Evelyn "Champagne" King (1993)	Let's Get Funky (1997)

Love Come Down: The Best of Evelyn "Champagne" King is a greatest hits album by American singer Evelyn "Champagne" King. It includes the songs "Shame", "I Don't Know If It's Right", "Love Come Down" and "I'm in Love."

AllMusic noted about the album, "Those who remember King's hits will savor this collection, while others who missed her prime period will hear why she was so dominant."

== Track listing ==
Side one

1. "Shame" – 6:31
2. "I Don't Know If It's Right" – 3:45
3. "Music Box" – 3:22
4. "I'm in Love" – 5:01
5. "Don't Hide Our Love" – 4:10
6. "Love Come Down" – 6:04
7. "Betcha She Don't Love You" – 3:57

Side two

8. "Get Loose" – 4:05
9. "Action" – 3:25
10. "Shake Down" – 3:52
11. "Teenager" – 3:57
12. "Just for the Night" – 4:44
13. "Give Me One Reason" – 3:56
14. "High Horse" – 4:00
15. "Your Personal Touch" – 3:58
