= Japhe Tejeda =

American singer, songwriter, guitarist, producer

- Born: New York City, U.S.
- Education: University at Albany, SUNY
- Musical career
- Genres: R&B; soul; hip-hop
- Occupations: Singer; songwriter; guitarist; producer
- Labels: T.W.IsM.; A&M Records; PolyGram

Japhe Cecilio Tejeda (August 4, 1976 - May 31, 2005) was an American singer, songwriter, guitarist, and producer, best known for co-writing "Don't Wanna Be a Player" and "The Boy Is Mine", as well as other various work with Rodney "Darkchild" Jerkins and his brother Fred Jerkins III. Tejeda, alongside friends Jermaine Paul, Danny Martinez, and Charles Paul, were former members of the R&B vocal quartet 1 Accord, one of the first signees on Shaquille O'Neal's short-lived The World Is Mine (T.W.IsM.) imprint in collaboration with A&M Records.

Not much is known about Tejeda's private life, but as reported by industry friends, R&B bloggers, and other close associates, Tejeda died on May 31, 2005.

== Career ==
=== 1990s: 1 Accord and songwriting ===
Tejeda and Charles Paul both attended University at Albany, SUNY in the early 1990s, and formed 1 Accord after recruiting Paul's younger brother Jermaine, performing at local Albany talent shows, coffeehouses, and live music venues in New York City. By the time Jermaine had graduated from high school in 1996, and Martinez was added to the group, their demo had landed the group a recording contract with Shaquille O’Neal’s label. After signing with O’Neal and building a relationship with producer Rodney Jerkins, the group was asked to contribute to the soundtrack of Jamie Foxx film Booty Call, as well as other film soundtracks, label compilations, unofficial radio DJ mixtapes, and the debut album of Lord Tariq and Peter Gunz. 1 Accord's 1996 debut album The New Era, executive-produced by Jerkins, was shelved in 1997 after numerous delays, leading Tejeda to move further into songwriting. The group disbanded, and Tejeda would subsequently join Jerkins' camp of songwriters, first appearing as a background vocalist on Jerkins' singles for Simone Hines and Jason Weaver, and then co-writing notable Jerkins productions including "Everything's Gonna Be Alright" from Aaliyah album One in a Million, more than fifty percent of the 1997 debut album for Michael Jackson-signed boyband No Authority, Top 30 Joe single "Don't Wanna Be a Player", and 13-week Brandy/Monica number-one single "The Boy Is Mine", earning Tejeda an ASCAP Pop Award and a Grammy nomination for Best R&B Song at the 41st Annual Grammy Awards in 1999. Tejeda subsequently appeared as a co-writer on multiple Jerkins-produced albums in 1998, including blockbuster album Never Say Never, as well as albums KW and 'Bout It. Both hit singles Tejada co-wrote have been sampled on multiple singles by other artists, charting internationally.

== Songwriting and production credits ==
Title	Year	Artist	Album
"Everything's Gonna Be Alright"	1996	Aaliyah	One in a Million
"You Got Me Goin'"	1996	II D Extreme	From I Extreme II Another
"Don't Wanna Be a Player"	1997	Joe	All That I Am
"Don't Stop"	1997	No Authority	Keep On
"Up And Down"	1997	No Authority	Keep On
"Girlfriend"	1997	No Authority	Keep On
"Please Don't Break My Heart"	1997	No Authority	Keep On
"If You Want Me"	1997	No Authority	Keep On
"Never Let You Go"	1997	No Authority	Keep On
"The Boy Is Mine"	1998	Brandy & Monica	Never Say Never & The Boy Is Mine
"Never Say Never"	1998	Brandy	Never Say Never
"Put That on Everything"	1998	Brandy	Never Say Never
"Happy"	1998	Brandy	Never Say Never
"Tomorrow"	1998	Brandy	Never Say Never
"I Warned You"	1998	Keith Washington	KW
"Tell Me (Are You with It)"	1998	Keith Washington	KW
"You Let Me Down"	1998	Keith Washington	KW
"Still Not A Player" (Featuring Joe)	1998	Big Pun	Capital Punishment
"Are You Missin' My Love?"	1998	Jesse Powell	'Bout It
"Up and Down"	1998	Jesse Powell	'Bout It
"Oogie Boogie"	1998	MC Lyte	Seven & Seven
"It's Mine"	1999	Mobb Deep	Murda Muzik
"Why?"	2001	Ashley Ballard	Get In The Booth
"Don't Leave"	2005	N2U	Issues
"The Girl Is Mine" (Featuring Destiny's Child & Brandy)	2015	99 Souls	Non-album single
"Right Back" (Featuring A Boogie wit da Hoodie)	2019	Khalid	Free Spirit
"Playa" (Featuring H.E.R.)	2022	A Boogie wit da Hoodie	Me vs. Myself
"Bionic Boy"	2022	Jamie Jones	Non-album single
"Mine"	2022	Tink	Pillow Talk
"Need Me"	2023	Lil Tecca	Tec
"Mazacote"	2024	Farruko & Ñengo Flow	CVRBON VRMOR

== Guest & miscellaneous vocal appearances ==
List of guest appearances as a member of 1 Accord and/or with other performing artists, showing year released and album name
Title	Year	Other performer(s)	Album
"Don't Wanna Be Alone"	1996	1 Accord, Shaquille O'Neal	You Can't Stop the Reign
"Stay With Me (LP Version)"	1996	Jason Weaver & Horace Brown	Stay With Me (Shelved)
"Yeah! Yeah! Yeah!"	1997	Simone Hines	Simone Hines
"A Dream"	1997	Mary J. Blige, 1 Accord, Darkchild Choir	Money Talks: The Album
"Don't Stop, Don't Quit"	1997	1 Accord	Booty Call: The Soundtrack
"Shortie Girl"	1997	1 Accord, Lord Tariq and Peter Gunz	The New Era (Shelved)
"River (Interlude)"	1998	1 Accord, Shaquille O'Neal	Respect
"Startin' Somethin'"	1998	1 Accord, Chauncey Black, Lord Tariq and Peter Gunz	Make It Reign
"A Night in the Bronx With Lord & Gunz"	1998	1 Accord, Lord Tariq and Peter Gunz	Make It Reign
"My Time to Go"	1998	1 Accord, Lord Tariq and Peter Gunz	Make It Reign
"Ooh Ooh Baby"	2000	1 Accord, DJ Capone	The Cartel Compilation Mixtape

== Awards and nominations ==
Year	Ceremony	Award	Result	Ref
1999	41st Annual Grammy Awards	Grammy Award for Best R&B Song (The Boy Is Mine)	Nominated	
1999	ASCAP Pop Awards	Most Performed Songs (The Boy Is Mine)	Won	
