= All That I Am =

All That I Am may refer to:

- All That I Am (Santana album), 2005
- All That I Am (Joe album), 1997
- All That I Am (Cynthia Johnson album), 2013
- All That I Am (Deborah Allen album), 1994
- "All That I Am" (Elvis Presley song), 1966
- "All That I Am" (Joe song), 1998
- "All That I Am", a song by Parachute from Losing Sleep
- All That I Am (novel), by Anna Funder
