= Call on Me =

Call on Me may refer to:

== Music ==
=== Albums ===
- Call on Me (album), a 1980 album by Evelyn King
- Call on Me, a 1963 album by Bobby Bland, and the title song

=== Songs ===
- "Call on Me" (Chicago song), 1974
- "Call on Me" (Eric Prydz song), 2004
- "Call on Me" (Janet Jackson song), featuring Nelly, 2006
- "Call on Me" (Starley song), 2016
- "Call on Me" (Tanya Tucker song), 1989
- "Call on Me", by 1927 from The Other Side
- "Call on Me", by Andy Bell from Non-Stop
- "Call on Me", by Bad Company from Straight Shooter
- "Call on Me", by Bebe Rexha from Bebe
- "Call on Me", by Big Brother and the Holding Company from Big Brother & the Holding Company
- "Call on Me", by Bread from On the Waters
- "Call on Me", by Captain Beefheart from Safe as Milk
- "Call on Me", by Eddie Money from Life for the Taking
- "Call on Me", by Four Tops, B-side of the single "Baby I Need Your Loving"
- "Call on Me", by Gilbert O'Sullivan
- "Call on Me", by James Ingram from It's Real
- "Call on Me", by Jody Watley from Affairs of the Heart
- "Call on Me", by John Anderson from All the People Are Talkin'
- "Call on Me", by Keke Wyatt from Soul Sista
- "Call on Me", by Laleh from Prinsessor
- "Call on Me", by Legend Seven from Blind Faith
- "Call on Me", by Lou Reed from The Raven
- "Call on Me", by Maze from Inspiration
- "Call on Me", by Michael Jackson from Farewell My Summer Love
- "Call on Me", by Primal Scream from Give Out But Don't Give Up
- "Call on Me", by Quicksilver Messenger Service from What About Me
- "Call on Me", by Spirit from California Blues
- "Call on Me", by Switch from Switch V
- "Call on Me", by Whitesnake from Good to Be Bad

== See also ==
- Call Me (disambiguation)
- "Valerie" (Steve Winwood song) (1982), which features the refrain "Call on me"
