= A Change Is Gonna Come (disambiguation) =

"A Change Is Gonna Come" is a song by Sam Cooke.

A Change Is Gonna Come may also refer to:

- A Change Is Gonna Come (Leela James album)
- A Change Is Gonna Come (Jack McDuff album), 1966
- "A Change Is Gonna Come" (The West Wing), title of an episode in the West Wing television series, in which the song was performed by James Taylor
- "A Change Is Gonna Come" (Grey's Anatomy)
- "Change Is Gonna Come", a song from Olly Murs, by Olly Murs
- "A Change Is Gonna Cum", a song from Smooth Noodle Maps, by Devo
- A Long Time Coming (A Change Is Gonna Come), an album by Evelyn "Champagne" King
