= Call Me =

Call Me may refer to:

== Music ==
=== Albums ===
- Call Me (Al Green album), and the title song, "Call Me (Come Back Home)" (see below)
- Call Me (Sylvester album)
- Call Me (EP), by Diamond Head, and the title song

=== Songs ===
- "Call Me" (Andrea True Connection song), 1976
- "Call Me" (Anna Vissi song), 2004
- "Call Me" (Aretha Franklin song), 1970; notably covered by Diana Ross (1971) and by Phil Perry (1991)
- "Call Me" (Blondie song), theme from the film American Gigolo, 1980
- "Call Me" (The Chambers Brothers song), 1965
- "Call Me" (Deee-Lite song), 1994
- "Call Me" (Deejay Jay feat. Pandora song), 2008
- "Call Me" (Feminnem song), the Bosnian and Herzegovinian entry in the Eurovision Song Contest 2005
- "Call Me" (Go West song), 1985
- "Call Me" (Jamelia song), 2000
- Call Me (Johnny Mathis song), 1958
- "Call Me" (Le Click song), 1997
- "Call Me" (Nav and Metro Boomin song), 2017
- "Call Me" (Petula Clark song), 1965; notably covered by Chris Montez (1965) and Frank Sinatra (1966)
- "Call Me" (Shinedown song), 2008
- "Call Me" (Skyy song), 1981
- "Call Me" (Spagna song), 1986
- "Call Me" (Too Short and Lil' Kim song), 1997
- "Call Me" (Tweet song), 2002
- "Call Me (Come Back Home)", by Al Green, 1973
- "Call Me", by Bonnie Tyler from Angel Heart, 1992
- "Call Me", by BoyNextDoor from 19.99, 2024
- "Call Me", by Carly Pearce from Carly Pearce, 2020
- "Call Me", by Dennis DeYoung from Back to the World, 1986
- "Call Me", by Golden Earring from Winter-Harvest, 1967
- "Call Me", by Groove Coverage from 21st Century, 2006
- "Call Me", by Imelda May from Life Love Flesh Blood, 2017
- "Call Me", by Kimbra from Vows, 2011
- "Call Me", by the Louvin Brothers from Encore, 1961
- "Call Me", by Luke Combs from Growin' Up, 2022
- "Call Me", by Marcos Hernandez
- "Call Me", by Neiked, 2017
- "Call Me", by Queen + Paul Rodgers from The Cosmos Rocks, 2008
- "Call Me", by Ringo Starr from Goodnight Vienna, 1974
- "Call Me", by Sarah Klang, 2019
- "Call Me", by St. Paul and The Broken Bones, 2014
- "Call Me", by Taegoon from 1st Mini Album, 2009
- "Call Me", by Throwing Muses from Throwing Muses, 1986
- "Call Me", by Tricky from Juxtapose, 1999
- "Call Me", by UFO from You Are Here, 2004
- "Call Me", by Way Out West from Intensify, 2001
- "Call Me", by Yeat from 2 Alive, 2022
- "Call Me (Late at Night)" by Ansonbean, 2023
- "Call Me (Late at Night), Pt. 2" by Ansonbean and Thaimay from One Dance, 2024
- "Call Me (She Said)", by Joell Ortiz from Free Agent, 2011

== Other uses ==
- The name in the Unicode database for the gesture emoji 🤙
- Call Me (film), a 1988 erotic thriller
- Call Me: The Rise and Fall of Heidi Fleiss, a 2004 TV movie about "Hollywood Madam" Heidi Fleiss
- "Call Me", an episode of the TV series Pocoyo

== See also ==
- Call on Me (disambiguation)
