= No One Else Comes Close =

Single by Joe

from the album All That I Am
- Released: April 1, 1998
- Recorded: 1997
- Studio: The Crib (Maplewood, New Jersey); BearTracks Studios (Suffern, New York)
- Genre: R&B
- Length: 3:52
- Label: Jive
- Songwriters: Joe Thomas; Gary Baker; Wayne Perry
- Producers: Joe; Edwin Nicholas

Joe singles chronology
"All That I Am" (1998)	"No One Else Comes Close" (1998)	"Thank God I Found You" (1999)

"No One Else Comes Close" is a song by American R&B singer Joe. It was written by Joe, Gary Baker, and Wayne Perry for his second studio album All That I Am, featuring production from Joe and Edwin Nicholas. Released as the album's fifth single, the song peaked at number 41 on the UK Singles Chart.

== Track listings ==
CD single
No.	Title	Length
1.	"No One Else Comes Close" (album version)	3:50
2.	"All the Things" (edit)	3:22

CD maxi single
No.	Title	Length
1.	"No One Else Comes Close"	3:52
2.	"No One Else Comes Close" (Steve Antony's R&B mix)	4:44
3.	"Watcha Gotta Do"	4:32

== Cover versions ==
The Backstreet Boys covered the song as the eleventh track on their 1999 album Millennium. In an interview with Billboard, co-writer Gary Baker discussed development of the song:

I had a writing day with Joe Thomas and Wayne Perry, then I played it to Clive and he said, "I want Joe to do this, but I also want to put it on Millennium." It was extremely exciting because I love Joe and his version is unbelievable, but that Millennium record -- man, that was the record to be on!

== Credits and personnel ==
Credits adapted from the liner notes of All That I Am.

- Vocals by Joe Thomas
- Written by Gary Baker, Joe Thomas, and Wayne Perry
- Produced by Joe Thomas and Edwin Nicholas
- Recording by Earl Cohen
- Mastering by Jed Hackett
- Mixing by Gerard Smerek
- Guitar by George Walderius
- Recorded at The Crib (Maplewood, New Jersey) and BearTracks Studios

== Charts ==
=== Weekly charts ===
Chart (1998)	Peak position
UK Singles (OCC)	41
UK Dance (OCC)	40
UK Hip Hop/R&B (OCC)	12

=== Year-end charts ===
Chart (1998)	Position
UK Urban (Music Week)	39
