= I'm in Love (Evelyn King album) =

Studio album by Evelyn "Champagne" King
- Released: June 21, 1981
- Genres: R&B; post-disco; soul
- Length: 37:24
- Label: RCA Victor
- Producers: Morrie Brown; Willie Lester; Rodney Brown; Kashif; Paul Lawrence Jones

Evelyn "Champagne" King chronology
Call on Me (1980)	I'm in Love (1981)	Get Loose (1982)

Singles from I'm in Love
- 1. "I'm in Love" Released: June 1981; 2. "If You Want My Lovin'" Released: July 1981; 3. "Don't Hide Our Love" Released: October 1981; 4. "Spirit of the Dancer" Released: January 1982

Professional ratings
Review scores
Source	Rating
AllMusic	4/5 stars
Smash Hits	7/10

I'm in Love is the fourth studio album by American R&B singer Evelyn "Champagne" King, released on June 21, 1981, by RCA Records. It was produced by Morrie Brown, Willie Lester, Rodney Brown, Kashif, and Lawrence Jones.

== Background ==
By the time her previous album Call on Me was released, disco music in the United States faced severe backlash across the country pressuring it to move underground. The now infamous so-called "death of disco" propelled artists to look elsewhere for inspiration, one of which was the way of "one-man bands" pioneered by Stevie Wonder. King was one of the previous successful disco artists who followed the new direction in music, "my whole thing was, I was a big believer in making sure others were heard because they had a different sound." Theodore Life (or T. Life) who produced her chart-topping song "Shame" and album Call on Me was replaced by multi-instrumentalist Kashif and songwriters Morrie Brown, and Paul Lawrence Jones III. The songwriting duo Rodney Brown and Willie Lester, who were involved in working with Gayle Adams and Sharon Redd, composed, arranged and produced "Don't Hide Our Love," "What Are You Waiting For," "The Other Side Of Love," "I Can't Take It," and "The Best Is Yet To Come." On her producer change King commented, "I'm not going to say my new producers were a better fit than, say, T. Life. I'm going to just say they were a good match for the time. [...] If you keep staying in the same area, if you sound the same all the time—people can get bored with that. They made sure that Evelyn hit the top spot again! It was just fun."

== History ==
The album peaked at number 6 on the R&B albums chart and number 28 on the Billboard 200. It produced the hit singles "I'm In Love", "If You Want My Lovin'", "Don't Hide Our Love", and "Spirit of the Dancer". The album was digitally remastered and reissued on CD with bonus tracks in 2011 by Big Break Records.

== Track listing ==
Side one
No.	Title	Writer(s)	Length
1.	"I'm in Love"	Kashif Saleem	5:01
2.	"If You Want My Lovin'"	Lawrence Jones, Morrie Brown	4:18
3.	"Don't Hide Our Love"	Lawrence Jones, Arthur Moore	5:22
4.	"What Are You Waiting For"	Willie Lester, Rodney Brown	4:09

Side two
No.	Title	Writer(s)	Length
5.	"Spirit of the Dancer"	Kashif Saleem, Morrie Brown	4:50
6.	"The Other Side of Love"	Willie Lester, Rodney Brown	4:24
7.	"I Can't Take It"	Rodney Brown, Willie Lester	4:07
8.	"The Best Is Yet to Come"	Willie Lester, Rodney Brown	5:13

2011 remastered bonus tracks
No.	Title	Length
9.	"I'm in Love" (Single Version)	3:51
10.	"If You Want My Lovin'" (UK Single Version)	3:15
11.	"Don't Hide Our Love" (Single Version)	4:11
12.	"Spirit of the Dancer" (Single Version)	3:25
13.	"I'm in Love" (12" Dance Mix)	5:52

== Personnel ==
- Percussion – Bashiri Johnson
- Backing vocals – B.J Nelson
- Lyrics, music by – Kashif Saleem
- Horns, strings – Ralph Schuckett
- Guitar – Ira Siegel
- Drums – Steve Walker
- French horn – Robert Gloff
- Mixed by, recorded by – "Magic Hands", Steve Goldman (If You Want My Lovin'")

== Charts ==
Chart (1981)	Peak
U.S. Billboard Top LPs	28
U.S. Billboard Top Soul LPs	6

Singles

Year	Single	Peak chart positions		
Year	Single	US	US R&B	US Dance
1981	"I'm in Love"	40	1	1
1981	"Don't Hide Our Love"	—	28	—
1982	"Spirit of the Dancer"	—	51	54
