= Flirt (album) =

Studio album by Evelyn "Champagne" King
- Released: April 27, 1988
- Recorded: 1987–1988
- Genres: R&B, dance-pop
- Length: 41:36
- Label: EMI-Manhattan
- Producers: Leon Sylvers III, Teneen Ali, Ron "Have Mercy" Kersey, Alex Brown, Wah Wah Watson, Evan Rogers, Carl Sturken

Evelyn "Champagne" King chronology
| A Long Time Coming (A Change Is Gonna Come) (1985) | Flirt (1988) | The Girl Next Door (1989) |

Professional ratings
Review scores
| Source | Rating |
|---|---|
| AllMusic | 2/5 stars |

Flirt is the ninth studio album by American R&B singer Evelyn "Champagne" King, released on April 27, 1988, by EMI-Manhattan Records. It was produced by Leon Sylvers III, Teneen Ali, Ron "Have Mercy" Kersey, Alex Brown, Wah Wah Watson, Evan Rogers, and Carl Sturken.

== History ==
The album peaked at #20 on the R&B albums chart. It also reached #192 on the US Billboard 200. It produced the hit singles "Flirt", "Hold On to What You've Got" and "Kisses Don't Lie".

== Track listing ==
Side one
| No. | Title | Writer(s) | Length |
|---|---|---|---|
| 1. | "Flirt" | Leon Sylvers III | 5:55 |
| 2. | "You Can Turn Me On" | Giovanni D'Orazio | 6:03 |
| 3. | "Kisses Don't Lie" | Ron Kersey, Alex Brown | 4:47 |
| 4. | "Stop It" | Guy Caman, Sylvia Smith, Mevlin Ragin | 4:48 |

Side two
| No. | Title | Writer(s) | Length |
|---|---|---|---|
| 5. | "Hold On to What You've Got" | Leon Sylvers III, Gene Dozier | 5:59 |
| 6. | "When Your Heart Says Yes" | Evan Rogers, Carl Sturken | 4:46 |
| 7. | "Before the Date" | Leon F. Sylvers III, Jeannette Michelle Sylvers, Terrell Len Ray | 5:00 |
| 8. | "Whenever You Touch Me" | Ron Kersey, Alex Brown | 4:43 |

== Charts ==
| Chart (1988) | Peak |
|---|---|
| U.S. Billboard Top LPs | 192 |
| U.S. Billboard Top Black LPs | 20 |

Singles

| Year | Single | Peak chart positions | | |
| Year | Single | US R&B | US Dance | UK Singles Chart |
|---|---|---|---|---|
| 1988 | "Flirt" | 3 | — | 106 |
| 1988 | "Hold On to What You've Got" | 8 | 5 | 47 |
| 1988 | "Kisses Don't Lie" | 17 | — | — |
