= All That I Am (Joe album) =

Studio album by Joe
- Released: July 29, 1997
- Recorded: 1995–1997
- Studio: NJ & NY Studios Area
- Genre: R&B
- Length: 55:58
- Label: Jive
- Producer: Larry "Rock" Campbell; Rodney "Darkchild" Jerkins; Joe; Gerald Levert; Edwin "Tony" Nicholas; Joshua P. Thompson

Joe chronology
Everything (1993)	All That I Am (1997)	My Name Is Joe (2000)

Singles from All That I Am
- 1. "All the Things (Your Man Won't Do)" Released: January 30, 1996; 2. "Don't Wanna Be a Player" Released: April 15, 1997; 3. "The Love Scene" Released: June 3, 1997; 4. "Good Girls" Released: November 11, 1997; 5. "All That I Am" Released: March 31, 1998

All That I Am is the second album by American R&B singer Joe. It was released by Jive Records on July 29, 1997, in the United States, marking his debut with the label. Widely considered his breakthrough album, All That I Am reached number thirteen on the US Billboard 200 and number four on the Top R&B/Hip-Hop Albums chart. It was eventually certified Platinum by the Recording Industry Association of America (RIAA).

== Promotion ==
The album features "All the Things (Your Man Won't Do)", originally featured on the soundtrack of Don't Be a Menace to South Central While Drinking Your Juice in the Hood, which reached number two on the US R&B chart and number eleven on the Billboard Hot 100; it sold 700,000 copies domestically and was certified Gold by the RIAA. The album also features "Don't Wanna Be a Player", which originally appeared on the soundtrack to the 1997 film Booty Call and reached number five on the US R&B chart and number twenty-five on the Hot 100. It, too, earned a Gold certification for sales of 500,000 copies. Aside from these two songs, All That I Am features three singles: the lead single "The Love Scene", "Good Girls" and the title track. Although they received airplay on R&B radio stations, none registered on the Hot R&B Singles chart. Pop group Backstreet Boys covered the song "No One Else Comes Close" on their 1999 album Millennium.

== Critical reception ==
Professional ratings
Review scores
Source	Rating
AllMusic	4/5 stars
Entertainment Weekly	B−
USA Today	3/4 stars

AllMusic editor Leo Stanley called All That I Am "an entertaining collection of contemporary soul that alternates between smooth ballads and hip-hop-inflected dance-pop. At his best, Joe can make this music irresistible; at his worst, he merely makes it entertaining. There are a few slow spots on the record, but at its best, All That I Am is first-class urban soul." David Grad from Entertainment Weekly found that with All That I Am Joe "labors under the twin burdens of hackneyed lyrics and saccharine overproduction. Fortunately, his voice is seductive enough to cut through all the formulaic dross, ensuring that this guy named Joe will be a leading R&B love doctor for years to come." USA Today critic Steve Jones wrote that with All That I Am Joe "looks at the many facets of relationships, shifting easily from love-you-down recipes for ecstasy" to "gentle professions of affection," while exploring "the pain of discovering that his lover has another man and ending what has become a one-way relationship."

== Track listing ==
All That I Am track listing
No.	Title	Writer(s)	Producer(s)	Length
1.	"All the Things (Your Man Won't Do)"	Joe Thomas; Joshua Thompson; Michele Williams	Joe; Thompson	6:22
2.	"The Love Scene"	Thomas; Jolyon Skinner; Michele Williams	Joe; Edwin "Tony" Nicholas	5:02
3.	"Don't Wanna Be a Player"	Thomas; Japhe Tejeda; Skinner; Williams; Rodney Jerkins	Joe; Jerkins	5:07
4.	"Good Girls"	Thomas; Thompson; Williams	Joe; Thompson	4:57
5.	"How Soon"	Gerald Levert; Nicholas	Levert; Nicholas	4:53
6.	"Sanctified Girl (Can't Fight This Feeling)"	Thomas; Skinner; Larry Campbell	Campbell	5:00
7.	"All That I Am"	Larry Lofton; Mattias Gustafsson	Thomas; Nicholas	4:12
8.	"No One Else Comes Close"	Thomas; Gary Baker; Wayne Perry	Thomas; Nicholas	3:52
9.	"Come Around"	Thomas; Skinner; Campbell	Campbell	4:34
10.	"U Shoulda Told Me (U Had a Man)"	Thomas; Skinner; Campbell	Campbell	3:45
11.	"Love Don't Make No Sense"	Thomas; Skinner; Williams	Thomas; Nicholas	4:21
12.	"No One Else Comes Close" (Unplugged Version)	Thomas; Baker; Perry	Thomas; Nicholas	3:53

Australian bonus tracks
No.	Title	Writer(s)	Producer(s)	Length
13.	"No One Else Comes Close" (Steve Antony's R'n'B Mix)	Thomas; Gary Baker; Wayne Perry	Thomas; Nicholas; Steve Antony^{[a]}	4:44
14.	"Don't Wanna Be a Player" (Joe/Big Baby Remix)	Thomas; Tejeda; Skinner; Williams; Jerkins	Joe; Jerkins; Darryl "Big Baby" McClary^{[a]}	5:10
15.	"Good Girls" (TLAC Remix)	Thomas; Thompson; Williams	Joe; Thompson; Tosh^{[a]}	5:02
16.	"The Love Scene" (Henry St. Remix)	Thomas; Skinner; Williams	Joe; Nicholas; Henry Street^{[a]}	7:40

Notes

- ^{^[a]} signifies additional producer(s)

== Charts ==
=== Weekly charts ===
Weekly chart performance for All That I Am
Chart (1997)	Peak position
Australian Albums (ARIA)	115
Dutch Albums (Album Top 100)	29
Swedish Albums (Sverigetopplistan)	52
UK Albums (Official Charts)	26
UK Independent Albums (Official Charts)	15
UK R&B Albums (Official Charts)	4
US Billboard 200	13
US Top R&B/Hip-Hop Albums (Billboard)	4

=== Year-end charts ===
Year-end chart performance for All That I Am
Chart (1997)	Position
US Billboard 200	153
US Top R&B/Hip-Hop Albums (Billboard)	40

== Certifications ==
Certifications and sales for All That I Am
Region	Certification	Certified units/sales
United Kingdom (BPI)	Silver	60,000^{^}
United States (RIAA)	Platinum	1,200,000
^{^} Shipments figures based on certification alone.
