= I'll Keep a Light On =

Studio album by Evelyn "Champagne" King
- Released: 1995
- Recorded: 1995
- Genres: Funk; soul
- Label: Expansion
- Producer: Various

Evelyn "Champagne" King chronology
The Girl Next Door (1989)	I'll Keep a Light On (1995)	Open Book (2007)

I'll Keep a Light On is the eleventh studio album by American singer Evelyn "Champagne" King, released in 1995 by Expansion Records. It contains the single "I Think About You". Afterwards, King took a break from music until 2007's Open Book.

Professional ratings
Review scores
Source	Rating
Muzik	4/5 stars

== Track listing ==
1. "Fascinated" – 5:34
2. "I Think About You" – 5:08
3. "I'll Keep a Light On" – 5:45
4. "It Doesn't Really Matter" – 4:23
5. "When It Comes Down to It" – 4:19
6. "Sweet Funky Thing" – 4:40
7. "A Lover I Can Love" – 4:39
8. "Star Child" – 4:57
9. "Love Is Love (All Over the World)" – 4:20
10. "It's Not That Kind of Party" – 4:48
11. "In It for Me" – 4:22
12. "Hold Tight" – 4:26
13. "Shame '95" – 6:24

== Personnel ==
- Rick Chudacoff – producer (1)
- Christopher Troy and Zach Harmon – producer (2, 5)
- Laney Stewart and Tony Hanes – producer (3, 7)
- Dennis Lambert – producer (4, 8)
- Tommy Faragher – producer (6)
- Reed Vertelney – producer (9)
- Preston Glass – producer (10)
- Michael Jay and Greg Lawson – producer (11)
- Charles Stewart and Thaddis Harrell – producer (12)
- John Fitch, Ruben Cross and T-Life – producer (13)

== Singles ==
- "I Think About You"
