= Music Box (Evelyn King album) =

Studio album by Evelyn "Champagne" King
- Released: March 19, 1979
- Recorded: 1978
- Studios: Secret Sound, New York City; Alpha International, Philadelphia
- Genre: Disco
- Length: 65:10
- Labels: RCA Victor; Funky Town Grooves
- Producers: Theodore Life; Bill Greene; Sam Peake

Evelyn "Champagne" King chronology
Smooth Talk (1977)	Music Box (1979)	Call on Me (1980)

Music Box is the second studio album by American R&B singer Evelyn "Champagne" King, released on March 19, 1979, by RCA Records. It was produced by Theodore Life, Bill Greene and Sam Peake. It's also noted for featuring Luther Vandross on backing vocals.

== History ==
The album peaked at #12 on the R&B albums chart. It also reached #35 on the Billboard 200. It produced the singles "Music Box" and "Out There". The album was certified gold by the RIAA. The album was digitally remastered and reissued on CD with bonus tracks in 2011 by Funky Town Grooves Records.

== Critical reception ==
Professional ratings
Review scores
Source	Rating
AllMusic	3/5 stars

The Bay State Banner wrote that "King sounds like Michael Jackson, her lyrics are a sight-seer's tour of disco clubs, and her music is bubblegum with a Sylvers' accent... What saves the King performance from being prissy is her part tomboy, part kitten voice."

== Track listing ==
Side one
No.	Title	Writer(s)	Length
1.	"Music Box"	Theodore Life, Sam Peake, John H. Fitch, Jr.	6:43
2.	"Let's Start All Over Again"	Theodore Life	3:52
3.	"Out There"	Sam Peake, Theodore Life	4:13
4.	"No Time for Fooling Around"	Sam Peake, Theodore Life	3:31
5.	"Steppin' Out (Pt. 1)"	Theodore Life, Bill Greene	3:59

Side two
No.	Title	Writer(s)	Length
6.	"Steppin' Out (Pt. 2)"	Theodore Life, Bill Greene	5:50
7.	"Make Up Your Mind"	Theodore Life, Mikki Farrow, Joe Freeman	5:01
8.	"I Think My Heart Is Telling"	John H. Fitch, Jr., Reuben Cross	4:22
9.	"It's OK"	William Kimes, Ken Dudley	3:49
Total length:			41:20

2011 remastered bonus tracks
No.	Title	Length
10.	"Music Box" (12" Version)	7:27
11.	"Out There" (12" Version)	6:15
12.	"Make Up Your Mind" (12" Version)	6:30
13.	"Out There" (7" Version)	3:30

== Charts ==
Chart (1979)	Peak
U.S. Billboard Top LPs	35
U.S. Billboard Top Soul LPs	12

Singles

Year	Single	Peak chart positions		
Year	Single	US	US R&B	US Dance
1979	"Music Box"	75	14	78
1979	"Out There"	—	34	—
