= Don't Wanna Be a Player =

Single by Joe

from the album All That I Am
- Released: April 15, 1997
- Genre: R&B
- Length: 5:07
- Label: Jive
- Songwriters: Joe Thomas; Japhe Tejeda; Jolyon Skinner; Michele Williams; Rodney Jerkins
- Producer: Rodney Jerkins

Joe singles chronology
| "All the Things (Your Man Won't Do)" (1996) | "Don't Wanna Be a Player" (1997) | "The Love Scene" (1997) |

"Don't Wanna Be a Player" is a song by the American R&B singer Joe. It was written by Joe, Japhe Tejeda, Jolyon Skinner, Michele Williams and Rodney Jerkins, and produced by the latter for Joe's second studio album All That I Am (1997). Released as a single from the Booty Call (1997) soundtrack as well as All That I Am's second single, it reached number 21 on the Billboard Hot 100 and became Joe's second top ten hit on the Hot R&B/Hip-Hop Songs chart, reaching number five. In the United Kingdom, "Don't Wanna Be a Player" peaked at number 16 on the UK Singles Chart, ranking among his highest-charting singles there.

== Track listings ==
CD single
| No. | Title | Length |
|---|---|---|
| 1. | "Don't Wanna Be a Player" (Radio Version) | 4:19 |
| 2. | "Don't Wanna Be a Player" (Joe/Big Baby Remix) | 5:10 |
| 3. | "Don't Wanna Be a Player" (Joe/Big Baby Remix Without Rap) | 5:11 |
| 4. | "Don't Wanna Be a Player" (LP Version) | 5:06 |

Cassette single
| No. | Title | Length |
|---|---|---|
| 1. | "Don't Wanna Be a Player" (LP Version) | 5:06 |
| 2. | "Good Girls"/"Sanctified Girl"/"How Soon" | 5:09 |

== Credits and personnel ==
- Tom Brick – mastering
- Rodney Jerkins – mixing, producer, writer
- Dexter Simmons – mixing, recording
- Jolyon Skinner – writer
- Japhe Tejeda – guitar, writer
- Joe Thomas – mixing, vocals, writer
- Michele Williams – writer

== Charts ==
| Chart (1997) | Peak position |
|---|---|
| Australia (ARIA) | 125 |
| New Zealand (Recorded Music NZ) | 21 |
| Scotland Singles (Official Charts) | 97 |
| UK Singles (Official Charts) | 16 |
| UK Dance (Official Charts) | 10 |
| UK Hip Hop/R&B (Official Charts) | 2 |
| US Billboard Hot 100 | 21 |
| US Hot R&B/Hip-Hop Songs (Billboard) | 5 |

== Certifications ==
| Region | Certification | Certified units/sales |
|---|---|---|
| United States (RIAA) | Gold | 500,000^{^} |
^{^} Shipments figures based on certification alone.
