= Simone Hines (album) =

Studio album by Simone Hines
- Released: September 16, 1997
- Studio: Quad Studios (New York, NY); Sony Studios (New York, NY); Mystic Studios (Staten Island, NY); Studio 'N' That Hood (Los Angeles, CA); Tarpan Studios (San Rafael, CA); DARP Studios (Atlanta, GA); AXIS Studios, Inc. (New York, NY); Westlake Studios (Los Angeles, CA); SoundWeb Studios (San Rafael, CA); Cutting Room (New York, NY); Palm Tree Studios (North Hollywood, CA); The Track House (Chino Hills, CA); Skip Saylor's (Los Angeles, CA); Hillside Studios (Englewood, NJ)
- Genre: R&B
- Length: 1:04:40
- Label: Epic
- Producer: Andre Evans; Bernard Belle; Bob Antoine; Darkchild; Frank "Nitty" Pimentel; Gregory Charley; Harvey Mason Jr.; Jae-E; Manuel Seal; Mike Mani; Narada Michael Walden; Sauce; SOL; Steve Russell

Singles from Simone Hines
- 1. "Yeah! Yeah! Yeah!" Released: September 2, 1997; 2. "Only Fools Fool Around" Released: 1998

Professional ratings
Review scores
Source	Rating
AllMusic	3/5 stars

Simone Hines is the only studio album by American contemporary R&B singer Simone Hines, released September 16, 1997 via Epic Records. Recording sessions took place at Quad Studios, Sony Studios, Mystic Studios, Cutting Room and AXIS Studios in New York City, at Studio 'N' That Hood, Westlake Studios, Palm Tree Studios and Skip Saylor's in Los Angeles, at Tarpan Studios and SoundWeb Studios in San Rafael, at DARP Studios in Atlanta, at The Track House in Chino Hills and at Hillside Studios in Englewood. Production was handled by Gregory Charley, Manuel Seal, Michael "$" Mani, Sauce, Andre Evans, Bernard Belle, Bob Antoine, Darkchild, Frank "Nitty" Pimentel, Harvey Mason Jr., Jae-E, Narada Michael Walden, SOL and Steve Russell.

The album did not chart in the United States, however its lead single "Yeah! Yeah! Yeah!" peaked at No. 38 on the Billboard Hot R&B/Hip-Hop Songs chart.

== Track listing ==
No.	Title	Writer(s)	Producer(s)	Length
1.	"Yeah! Yeah! Yeah!"	Rodney Jerkins	Darkchild	4:24
2.	"The Way That You Feel"	Antoinette Roberson	Frank "Nitty" Primentel; Terrence Russell (voc.)	3:53
3.	"What Difference (Does It Make)"	Simone Hines; Wayne Davis; Nathan Walton; Kiehl Owens	SOL; Sauce (co.)	4:53
4.	"Best of My Love"	Al McKay; Maurice White	Narada Michael Walden	4:10
5.	"Only Fools Fool Around"	James Earley; Michael Mani	Jae-E; Mike Mani	4:24
6.	"Every Little Thing"	Gregory Charley	Gregory Charley; Manuel Seal	3:54
7.	"Never Been Alone"	Harvey Mason Jr.; Marc Nelson; Rachel Oden	Harvey Mason Jr.	4:15
8.	"I'm Ready"	Hines; Wendy Jackson	Mike Mani	4:41
9.	"Richest Woman in the World"	Andre Evans; Bob Antoine	Andre Evans; Bob Antoine	4:07
10.	"The Other Man"	Steve Russell	Steve Russell	5:33
11.	"Every Now and Then"	Hines; Charley	Gregory Charley; Manuel Seal	3:27
12.	"Call Me Up"	Curtis Wilson; Catrina Powell; Arvel McClinton	Sauce; Trina B.; Arvel McClinton	4:49
13.	"A Chance to Love"	Charley	Gregory Charley; Manuel Seal	4:22
14.	"Where Do I Go from Here"	Dianne Quander; Bernard Belle	Bernard Belle	7:48
Total length:				1:04:40

Notes

- Track 4 is a cover of The Emotions' 1977 song "Best of My Love".

== Personnel ==
- Simone Hines — vocals, vocal arrangement
- Japhe Tejeda — backing vocals
- Antoinette Roberson — backing vocals, vocal arrangement
- Nathan "N8" Walton — backing vocals, keyboards, producer, vocal arrangement
- Tavia Ivey — backing vocals
- Conesha Owens — backing vocals
- Sandy Griffith — backing vocals
- Tina Gibson — backing vocals
- Gregory Charley — backing vocals, keyboards, drums, drum programming, producer, vocal arrangement
- Meko — backing vocals
- Alex Rowe — backing vocals
- Heather Mason — backing vocals
- Wendy Jackson — backing vocals, vocal arrangement
- Steve Russell — backing vocals, producer, vocal arrangement
- Manuel Seal — backing vocals, acoustic guitar, keyboards, producer, vocal arrangement
- Catrina "Trina B." Powell — backing vocals, vocal & rhythm producer
- Isaac Phillips — guitar
- Rodney "Darkchild" Jerkins — keyboards, drums, producer, vocal arrangement, mixing
- Dexter Simmons — talkbox, mixing
- Wayne "Waye" Davis — keyboards, producer, vocal arrangement
- Kiehl Owens — drums, producer, vocal arrangement
- Curtis "Sauce" Wilson — drums, drum programming, producer
- James Fischer — guitar, keyboards, programming
- Narada Michael Walden — bass, cymbal, drum programming, producer, arrangement
- James "Jae-E" Earley — guitar, producer, vocal arrangement
- Vernon "Ice" Black — guitar
- Michael "$" Mani — keyboards, drum programming, producer, vocal arrangement, mixing
- Michael Thompson — guitar
- Nathan East — bass
- Harvey Mason Jr. — drums, producer, vocal arrangement, mixing
- Troy Patterson — guitar
- Teddy Bishop — keyboards, drums
- Michael Goods — keyboards
- Frank "Nitty" Primentel — producer
- Andre Evans — producer, vocal arrangement
- Bob Antoine — producer, vocal arrangement
- Bernard Belle — producer, arrangement, mixing
- Terrence Russell — vocal producer
- Arvel McClinton — rhythm producer
- David Kennedy — mixing
- Kevin Davis — mixing
- David Frazer — recording, mixing
- Ken Kessie — mixing, engineering
- Ben Arrindell — mixing
- Gerard Smerek — mixing
- Brad Gilderman — mixing
- Steve Counter — engineering
- Brian Frye — mixing
- Victor Flores — mixing
- Dave Kawawski — mixing
- Josephine DiDonato — art direction, design
- Bill Heuberger — photography
