= So Romantic =

Studio album by Evelyn "Champagne" King
- Released: October 16, 1984
- Recorded: May–August 1984
- Genres: Pop, dance-pop
- Label: RCA Victor
- Producers: Clif Magness, Glen Ballard, Carl Sturken, Evan Rogers, Hawk, Jimmy Douglass, The System

Evelyn "Champagne" King chronology
Face to Face (1983)	So Romantic (1984)	A Long Time Coming (A Change Is Gonna Come) (1985)

So Romantic is the seventh studio album by American singer Evelyn "Champagne" King, released on October 16, 1984, by RCA Records. It was produced by Clif Magness, Glen Ballard, Carl Sturken, Evan Rogers, Hawk, Jimmy Douglass, and the System.

The album peaked at No. 38 on the U.S. Billboard Top R&B/Hip-Hop Albums chart. It featured the hit singles "Just for the Night", "I'm So Romantic", "Out of Control", "Give Me One Reason", and "Till Midnight". The album was digitally remastered and reissued on CD with bonus tracks in 2014 by Funky Town Grooves Records.

== Critical reception ==
Professional ratings
Review scores
Source	Rating
AllMusic	4/5 stars

In a retrospective review for AllMusic, critic Justin Kantor wrote of the album, "the overall sound is very solid with an adept mixture of live instrumentation and synthesizers. With King's bold vocals atop them, the songs on So Romantic make it one of her strongest '80s albums."

== Track listing ==
Side one
No.	Title	Writer(s)	Length
1.	"Show Me (Don't Tell Me)"	Glen Ballard, Clif Magness	4:42
2.	"Heartbreaker"	Evan Rogers, Carl Sturken	5:00
3.	"Till Midnight"	Keithen Carter, Bruce Gaitsch	5:01
4.	"Just for the Night"	Keithen Carter, Pat Leonard, Bruce Gaitsch	4:45
5.	"Give Me One Reason"	Glen Ballard, Clif Magness	3:58

Side two
No.	Title	Writer(s)	Length
6.	"Out of Control"	Jimmy Douglass, Eugene Jackson	5:30
7.	"Talking in My Sleep"	Evelyn "Champagne" King, Clarence Robert Brice	4:59
8.	"I'm So Romantic"	Mic Murphy, David Frank	5:16
9.	"So in Love"	Mic Murphy, David Frank	4:08

2014 Remastered Bonus Tracks
No.	Title	Length
10.	"Till Midnight" (12 inch Remixed Version)	5:21
11.	"Till Midnight" (Dub Version)	6:31
12.	"Till Midnight" (Acapella)	0:55
13.	"Out of Control" (12 inch Remixed Version)	5:49
14.	"Out of Control" (Vocal Dub Version)	6:39
15.	"Just for the Night" (7 inch Version)	3:34
16.	"Just for the Night" (TV Instrumental)	4:44

== Charts ==
Chart (1984)	Peak
U.S. Billboard Top LPs	203
U.S. Billboard Top Black LPs	38

Singles

Year	Single	Peak chart positions		
Year	Single	US	US R&B	US Dance
1984	"Just for the Night"	107	16	45
1985	"Out of Control"	—	54	14
1985	"Till Midnight"	—	57	—
