= The Love Scene =

1997 single by Joe

Single by Joe

from the album All That I Am
- Released: June 3, 1997
- Genre: R&B
- Length: 5:02
- Label: Jive
- Songwriter(s): Joe Thomas; Jolyon Skinner; Michele Williams
- Producer(s): Joe; Edwin "Tony" Nicholas

Joe singles chronology
"Don't Wanna Be a Player" (1997)	"The Love Scene" (1997)	"Good Girls" (1997)

"The Love Scene" is a song by American R&B singer Joe. It was written by Joe, Jolyon Skinner, and Michele Williams for his second studio album All That I Am (1997), while production was helmed by Joe and Edwin "Tony" Nicholas. Released as the album's third single, it reached number 22 on the UK Singles Chart and number 31 on the New Zealand Singles Chart, while peaking at number two on Billboard's US Adult R&B Songs chart.

== Track listings ==
CD single
No.	Title	Length
1.	"The Love Scene" (Radio Edit)	4:08
2.	"Sanctified Girl (Can't Fight This Feeling)" (Joe/Big Baby Remix)	4:59
3.	"The Love Scene" (LP Version)	4:59
4.	"The Love Scene" (Henry St. Radio Mix)	4:28

== Credits and personnel ==
- Monique Anderson – backing vocals
- Randy Bowland – guitar
- Roger Che – recording assistance
- Eric Gast – recording
- Peter Mokran – mastering
- Rodney Jerkins – mixing, producer, writer
- Edwin "Tony" Nicholas – producer
- Jolyon Skinner – writer
- Joe Thomas – producer, vocals, writer
- Michele Williams – writer

== Charts ==
Chart (1997)	Peak position
Australia (ARIA)	185
New Zealand (Recorded Music NZ)	31
UK Singles (OCC)	22
UK Dance (OCC)	27
UK Hip Hop/R&B (OCC)	9
US Adult R&B Songs (Billboard)	2
US Dance Club Songs (Billboard)	38
US Radio Songs (Billboard)	65
US Rhythmic (Billboard)	24
