= Make It Reign (album) =

Studio album by Lord Tariq and Peter Gunz
- Released: June 2, 1998
- Recorded: 1997–98
- Studio: Unique Recordings (New York, NY); The Hit Factory (New York, NY); Ameraycan Studio (North Hollywood, CA); The Cutting Room (New York, NY); Skip Saylors (Los Angeles, CA)
- Genre: East Coast hip hop
- Length: 1:09:40
- Label: Columbia
- Producer: Kevin Mitchell (exec.); Dave Atkinson; Clark Kent; Floyd Wilcox; Father Time; KNS; Peter Gunz; Ron Lawrence; Ski Beatz; Spyda

Singles from Make It Reign
- 1. "Deja Vu (Uptown Baby)" Released: December 9, 1997

Make It Reign is the only studio album by American rap duo Lord Tariq and Peter Gunz. It was released on June 2, 1998, through Columbia Records. The recording sessions took place at the Hit Factory, at Unique Recordings, at the Cutting Room in New York City, at Ameraycan Studio and at Skip Saylors in Los Angeles. The production was handled by Dave Atkinson, DJ Clark Kent, Floyd Wilcox, Father Time, KNS, Peter Gunz, Ron Lawrence, Ski and Spyda. It features guest appearances from 1 Accord, Big Pun, Cam'ron, Chauncey Black, Fat Joe, Kurupt, Sticky Fingaz, and Will Tracks. The album peaked at No. 38 on the Billboard 200 and No. 8 on the Top R&B/Hip-Hop Albums in the United States, selling 40,000 copies in its first week.

Its lead single "Deja Vu (Uptown Baby)" peaked at No. 9 on the Billboard Hot 100, No. 4 on the Hot R&B/Hip-Hop Songs, No. 1 on the Hot Rap Songs, and was certified platinum by the Recording Industry Association of America for selling over one million copies. "Fiesta" is censored on the explicit version of the album.

== Critical reception ==
Professional ratings
Review scores
Source	Rating
AllMusic	4/5 stars
Los Angeles Times	2/4 stars
RapReviews	6/10
The Source	3.5/5 stars

The Los Angeles Times noted that, "although they deliver several satisfying songs, the scratchy-voiced Tariq and the smooth-flowing Gunz lack the charisma to carry the 18 cuts."

== Track listing ==
No.	Title	Writer(s)	Producer(s)	Length
1.	"Make It Reign"	S. Hamilton; P. Pankey; R. Franklin; K. Morris; P. Adams	Clark Kent	3:00
2.	"We Will Ball"	S. Hamilton; P. Pankey; D. Atkinson	Dave Atkinson	3:58
3.	"Massive Heat" (featuring Kurupt and Sticky Fingaz)	S. Hamilton; P. Pankey; R. Brown; K. Jones; R. Franklin; M. Gaye	Clark Kent	4:18
4.	"Sex, Money, Life, or Death" (Interlude)			1:20
5.	"One Life to Live"	S. Hamilton; P. Pankey; D. Atkinson	Dave Atkinson	4:30
6.	"Fiesta" (featuring Will Tracks)	S. Hamilton; F. Wilcox; L. Richie	Floyd Wilcox	3:54
7.	"Then & Now" (Interlude)			0:15
8.	"Startin' Somethin'" (featuring Chauncey Black)	M. Jackson	Peter Gunz	4:20
9.	"A Night in the Bronx With Lord & Gunz" (featuring 1 Accord)	S. Hamilton; P. Pankey; D. Atkinson; R. Sloane	Dave Atkinson; Spyda	3:56
10.	"Who Am I?"	S. Hamilton; P. Pankey; D. Atkinson; F. Wilcox	Dave Atkinson; Floyd Wilcox	3:35
11.	"Déjà Vu (Uptown Baby)"	D. Fagen; W. Becker	KNS	5:03
12.	"Keep On"	S. Hamilton; P. Pankey; R. Franklin; W. Henderson	Clark Kent	4:13
13.	"Worldwide"	P. Pankey; D. Atkinson; C. Coates	Dave Atkinson; Bodyguard (co.)	4:50
14.	"Streets to da Stage" (featuring Cam'ron)	S. Hamilton; P. Pankey; C. Giles; D. Atkinson	Dave Atkinson	3:50
15.	"BX Most Wanted" (Interlude)			1:02
16.	"Cross Bronx Expressway" (featuring Fat Joe and Big Punisher)	S. Hamilton; P. Pankey; J. Cartagena; C. Rios; D. Willis; H. Wheeler; A. Muhammad-Jones; J. Davis; M. Taylor; W. Irvine	Ski	5:23
17.	"Precipitation" (Interlude)		Father Time	2:45
18.	"My Time to Go" (featuring 1 Accord)	P. Pankey; R. Lawrence	Ron Lawrence	5:39
19.	"Be My Lady"			3:49
Total length:				1:09:40

Sample credits

- Track 1 contains samples from "Night Rider" performed by Alan Hawkshaw
- Track 3 contains a sample from "The Break In" performed by Marvin Gaye
- Track 6 contains an interpolation of "All Night Long" written by Lionel Richie
- Track 8 contains samples from "Wanna Be Startin' Somethin'" performed by Michael Jackson
- Track 11 contains elements from "Black Cow" performed by Steely Dan
- Track 12 contains samples from "Keep That Same Old Feeling" performed by The Crusaders
- Track 16 contains an interpolation of "Award Tour" written by Jonathan Davis, Ali Shaheed Muhammad, Malik Taylor & Weldon Irvine

== Personnel ==
- Sean Hamilton – main artist
- Peter Pankey – main artist, producer (track 8)
- 1 Accord – featured artist (tracks: 9, 18), backing vocals (track 8)
- Ricardo Brown – featured artist (track 3)
- Kirk Jones – featured artist (track 3)
- Will Tracks – featured artist (track 6)
- Chauncey Hannibal – featured artist (track 8)
- Cameron Giles – featured artist (track 14)
- Joseph Cartagena – featured artist (track 16)
- Christopher Rios – featured artist (track 16)
- Diane Gordon – backing vocals (track 13)
- Brenda Marquez – backing vocals (track 18)
- Debbie Mercado – backing vocals (track 18)
- Sara Ortiz – backing vocals (track 18)
- Mike Lorello – keyboards (track 18)
- Kenny Ortiz – mixing
- Eliud "Lou" Ortiz – mixing
- Louis Alfred III – mixing, recording
- Troy Hightower – mixing
- George Mayers – mixing
- Julian McBrowne – mixing
- Ken "Duro" Ifill – mixing
- Paul Falcone – recording
- Chris Puram – recording
- Acar Key – recording
- Miles "DJ Nastee" Balochian – recording
- Tulio Torrinello – recording
- Teddy Riley – re-mixing (track 8)
- Adam Olmstead – mixing assistant
- Chuck Shaw – mixing assistant
- Todd Butler – mixing assistant
- Dave Butcher – mixing assistant
- Dave O'Donnell – mixing assistant
- Ethan Schofer – mixing assistant
- Antonio "Tony G" Gonzalez – mixing assistant
- Kevin Lewis – mixing assistant
- Mike Koch – mixing assistant
- Tom Hughes – recording assistant
- James Olowokere – recording assistant
- Brian Calicchia – recording assistant
- Remy Ramos – recording assistant
- David Crafa – recording assistant
- Brady Barnett – recording assistant
- Alex Sprague – engineering assistant
- Tom Coyne – mastering
- Rodolfo Franklin – producer (tracks: 1, 3, 12)
- Dave Atkinson – producer (tracks: 2, 5, 9, 10, 13, 14)
- Floyd Wilcox – producer (tracks: 6, 10)
- Ross Sloane – producer (track 9)
- K. "DJ KNS" Streaks – producer (track 11)
- David Anthony Willis – producer (track 16)
- T. "Father Time" Speedy – producer (track 17)
- Ron "Amen-Ra" Lawrence – producer (track 18)
- Bodyguard – co-producer (track 13)
- Kevin Mitchell – executive producer, management
- Eric Beasley – associate producer, management
- Tracey Waples – A&R executive
- Lisa Hamilton – cover design
- Penna Omega – logo design
- Tim Carter – photography

== Charts ==
Chart (1998)	Peak position
US Billboard 200	38
US Top R&B/Hip-Hop Albums (Billboard)	8
