= Face to Face (Evelyn King album) =

Studio album by Evelyn "Champagne" King
- Released: November 7, 1983
- Recorded: 1982–1983
- Studios: Sunset Sound Factory; Sunter Sound; Devonshire Sound Studio (Hollywood, California); American Artists Studios (Minneapolis, Minnesota)
- Genres: R&B; post-disco; new wave
- Length: 62:33
- Label: RCA Victor
- Producers: André Cymone; Leon Sylvers III; Foster Sylvers; Joey Gallo

Evelyn "Champagne" King chronology
Get Loose (1982)	Face to Face (1983)	So Romantic (1984)

Professional ratings
Review scores
Source	Rating
AllMusic	3/5 stars

Face to Face is the sixth studio album by American R&B singer Evelyn "Champagne" King, released on November 7, 1983, by RCA Records. It was produced by André Cymone, Leon Sylvers III, Foster Sylvers, and Joey Gallo.

== Background ==
Straying from the post-disco sound prominent in her most commercially successful releases I'm in Love and Get Loose she embarked on a "punk funk" sound, moving towards the musical territory of Prince and the alike. In charge of the album production and musical direction was Leon Sylvers III, SOLAR Records producer known for his work for Shalamar and The Whispers, and Andre Cymone, a former bass player for Prince, replacing Kashif and Paul Lawrence Jones III.

== History ==
The album peaked at #24 on the R&B albums chart. It also reached #91 on the Billboard 200. It produced the hit singles "Action", "Shake Down", and "Teenager". The album was digitally remastered and reissued on CD with bonus tracks in 2011 by Funky Town Grooves Records.

== Track listing ==
Side one
No.	Title	Writer(s)	Length
1.	"Action"	Leon Sylvers III, Dana Meyers	5:50
2.	"Face to Face"	André Cymone	4:55
3.	"Shake Down"	Foster Sylvers, Rickey Smith, Pamela Phillips-Oland	6:20
4.	"Tell Me Something Good"	Terry Murphy, Pamela Phillips-Oland, Wilmer Raglin	5:10

Side two
No.	Title	Writer(s)	Length
5.	"Don't It Feel Good"	André Cymone	4:07
6.	"Makin' Me So Proud"	Terry Murphy, Pamela Phillips-Oland	4:17
7.	"Givin' You My Love (What Cha Gonna Do With It)"	William Bryant II, Tina Scott, D'Marie Warren, Roberta Stiger, Karon Floyd	3:40
8.	"Teenager"	André Cymone	3:40
9.	"Let's Get Crazy"	André Cymone	3:59

2011 Remastered FunkyTown Grooves Bonus Tracks
No.	Title	Length
10.	"Shake Down" (Dub Version)	6:49
11.	"Teenager" (12 inch Version)	5:16
12.	"Action" (7 inch Version)	3:28
13.	"Shake Down" (7 inch Version)	3:54

2012 Remastered BBR Bonus Tracks
No.	Title	Length
10.	"Shake Down" (12" M & M Dub Mix)	0:00
11.	"Teenager" (12 inch Version)	0:00
12.	"Action" (Single Version)	0:00
13.	"Shake Down" (Single Version)	0:00
14.	"Teenager" (Single Version)	0:00
15.	"Shake Down" (12" M & M Dance Mix)	0:00

== Personnel ==
- Evelyn "Champagne" King - Lead and Backing Vocals
- Foster Sylvers - Bass, Backing Vocals
- Leon Sylvers III - Keyboards, Percussion
- Joey Gallo, William Bryant II - Keyboards, Synthesizer Bass
- Marlo Henderson, Micki Free - Guitar
- Ricky Smith - Bass, Keyboards
- Terry Murphy - Keyboards
- Wardell Potts Jr. - Drums
- Jorge Bermudez, Terrence F. Floyd, Theodore Welch - Percussion
- Dana Meyers, Karon Floyd, Doris Ann Rhodes, Germain Brooks, Sheila Rankin - Backing Vocals

== Charts ==
Chart (1983)	Peak
U.S. Billboard Top LPs	91
U.S. Billboard Top Black LPs	24

Singles

Year	Single	Peak chart positions		
Year	Single	US	US R&B	US Dance
1983	"Action"	75	16	13
1984	"Shake Down"	107	12	34
1984	"Teenager"	—	28	—
