= Good Girls (Joe song) =

Single by Joe

from the album All That I Am
- Released: November 11, 1997
- Genre: R&B
- Length: 4:57
- Label: Jive
- Songwriter(s): Joe Thomas; Joshua Thompson; Michele Williams
- Producer(s): Joe; Joshua Thompson

Joe singles chronology
"The Love Scene" (1997)	"Good Girls" (1997)	"Still Not a Player" (1998)

"Good Girls" is a song by American R&B singer Joe. It was written by Joe, Joshua Thompson, and Michele Williams, and produced by Joe and Thompson for his second studio album All That I Am (1997). Released as the album's fourth single, it peaked at #1 on the U.S. R&B music charts and number 29 on the UK Singles Chart.

== Track listings ==
CD single
No.	Title	Length
1.	"Good Girls" (Radio Edit)	4:31
2.	"Good Girls" (T.L.A.C. Remix)	5:02
3.	"Don't Wanna Be a Player" (Joe/Big Baby Remix featuring Mic Vandalz)	5:10
4.	"Good Girls" (Instrumental Version)	4:56

== Credits and personnel ==
- Timmy Allen – drum programming
- Earl Cohen – recording
- Onaje Allen Gumbs – fender rhodes
- Geary Moore – guitar
- Ron A. Schaffer – mixing
- Joe Thomas – producer, vocals, writer
- Joshua Thompson – producer, writer
- Michele Williams – writer

== Charts ==
Chart (1997–98)	Peak position
UK Singles (OCC)	29
UK Dance (OCC)	16
UK Hip Hop/R&B (OCC)	10
US Adult R&B Songs (Billboard)	21
