= The Girl Next Door (album) =

Studio album by Evelyn "Champagne" King
- Released: September 15, 1989
- Recorded: 1989
- Genre: R&B
- Length: 52:53
- Label: EMI America
- Producers: Leon Sylvers III; Nayan; Marshall Jefferson; Ten City; David Cochrane; Johnny King

Evelyn "Champagne" King chronology
Flirt (1988)	The Girl Next Door (1989)	I'll Keep a Light On (1995)

Professional ratings
Review scores
Source	Rating
Allmusic	link

The Girl Next Door is the tenth studio album by American singer Evelyn "Champagne" King, released on September 15, 1989, by EMI Records.

== Track listing ==
Unless otherwise indicated, Information is based on Liner notes

#	Title	Writer(s)	Producer(s)	Length
1.	The Girl Next Door	Nayan Lassiter, Tom Carden	Nayan	5:02
2.	Magnet	Jeff Fargus, Gene Dozier	Leon Sylvers III	5:30
3.	Day To Day	Marshall Jefferson, Byron Stingily, Byron Burke, Herb Lawson	Marshall Jefferson, Ten City	8:01
4.	Cross Your Mind	Dianne Quander, David Cochrane	David Cochrane, Dianne Quander	4:59
5.	Footsteps In the Dark	The Isley Brothers, Elmer Bernstein	Leon Sylvers III	4:05
6.	Do Right	Gene Dozier	Leon Sylvers III	5:39
7.	Lover Man	Byron Stingily, Byron Burke, Herb Lawson	Ten City	5:23
8.	Serious	Nayan Lassiter, Damon Thornton	Nayan	4:45
9.	This Song	Johnny King	Johnny King, Evelyn "Champagne" King	4:58
10.	Thief In the Night	Jeff Fargus, Gene Dozier	Leon Sylvers III	5:05

== Personnel ==
- Evelyn “Champagne” King - Background Vocals (2–10), Lead Vocals
- Alicia Barlow - Background Vocals (2, 5–6, 10)
- Byron Burke - Keyboards, Bass played by (7)
- Phaedra Butler - Background Vocals (1)
- Tom Carden - Music programming, Drum Machine, Keyboards (1)
- Shawn Christopher - Background Vocals (3)
- David Cochrane - Background Vocals, All Instruments (4)
- Vicky Dewindt-King - Background Vocals (4, 8)
- Gene Dozier - Rhythm arranger, Keyboards, Synthesizer, Bass Synth, Drum Machine (6)
- Bill Estes - Music programming (8)
- Jeff Fargus - Rhythm arranger (5, 10), Music programming (5–6, 10), Keyboards, Synthesizer (2, 5–6, 10), Drum Machine (2, 10), Horns, Bass played by (10), Horn arranger (2, 6), String arranger, Drums (2)
- Grand Stuff - Horns played by (3, 7)
- Marshall Jefferson - Music arranger, Keyboards, Drums, Bass played by (3)
- David Josias - Percussion (3, 7)
- Johnny King - Keyboards, Drums, Bass played by, Background Vocals (9)
- Herb Lawson - Guitar, Background Vocals (3, 7), Additional Lead Vocals (7)
- Fred Leyro - Guitar (9)
- Robin Macatangay - Guitar (1, 8)
- Bob Mitchell - Music programming (9)
- Nayan - Music arranger, Music programming, Drum Machine (1, 8), Keyboards (1)
- Keith Nunally - Background Vocals (7)
- Dino Pinkney - Guitar (9)
- Etienne “ATN” Stadwijk - Music programming (8), Keyboards (1, 8)
- Byron Stingily - Background Vocals (3, 7), Additional Lead Vocals (7), Bass Vocals (3)
- Charmaine Sylvers - Background Vocals (2, 5–6, 10)
- Foster Sylvers - Bass Guitar (5–6)
- Leon Sylvers III - Rhythm arranger, Drum Machine, Bass Synth (5), Horn arranger (6)
- John Taylor - Guitar (2, 5–6)
- Ten City - Music arranger (3)
- Ten City Strings - Strings (7)
- Margo Thunder - Background Vocals (1)
- Earl Young - Drums (7)
