= Get Loose (album) =

Studio album by Evelyn King
- Released: August 11, 1982
- Recorded: 1981–1982
- Genres: R&B; post-disco
- Length: 40:35
- Label: RCA Victor
- Producer: Morrie Brown

Evelyn King chronology
I'm in Love (1981)	Get Loose (1982)	Face to Face (1983)

Singles from Get Loose
- 1. "Love Come Down" Released: July 1982; 2. "Betcha She Don't Love You" Released: August 1982; 3. "Back to Love" Released: November 1982; 4. "Get Loose" Released: January 1983

Get Loose is the fifth studio album by American singer Evelyn King, released on August 11, 1982, by RCA Records. It was produced by Morrie Brown with Kashif and Paul Lawrence Jones III as assistant producers.

== History ==
The album peaked at number-one on the R&B albums chart. It also reached #27 on the Billboard 200. It produced the hit singles "Love Come Down", "Betcha She Don't Love You", "Back to Love", and "Get Loose". The album was certified gold by the RIAA. The album was digitally remastered and reissued on CD with bonus tracks in 2010 by Big Break Records and Sony Music Legacy.

== Reception ==
Professional ratings
Review scores
Source	Rating
AllMusic	4/5 stars
BBC	(positive)
Robert Christgau	B−
Pitchfork	9.0/10

Phyl Garland of Stereo Review complimented the sound quality, calling it "good" but was disenchanted with the album's content and felt its success was "[an] indication of the pitifully limited taste of youngsters addicted to junk music. The heavy beat, underscoring such lyrics as 'Ooh, you make my love come down,' is supposed to incite a desire to dance, but this treatment is about as exciting as an unwashed sock. Both the tunes and lyrics (if you can call them that) sound as if they were written by a computer programmed to churn out mindless cliches. She is good enough to make me almost like the better items here, Betcha She Don't Love You, Stop That, I'm Just Warmin' Up. Otherwise listening to this album is like being trapped inside one of those portable noise machines that culturally stunted kids tote through the streets. Performance: too programmed, recording: Good."

In The Boston Phoenix, Mike Freedberg said that "Get Loose is King’s most assured album, because she sustains a teased, tweety soprano that fends off rather than swings the rhythm, that spurns vibrato and sophistication. This is not to say that she sings plain emotions plainly. Her audience wouldn’t stand for that — it demands that she hide her emotions, adeptly, behind some sort of cool. Her cool’s a voice mask, and what a mask."

== Track listing ==
Side one
No.	Title	Writer(s)	Length
1.	"Love Come Down"	Kashif	6:08
2.	"I Can't Stand It"	Paul Lawrence Jones III	4:05
3.	"Betcha She Don't Love You"	Kashif	5:05
4.	"Get Loose"	Paul Lawrence Jones III	4:51

Side two
No.	Title	Writer(s)	Length
5.	"Back to Love"	Kashif	5:17
6.	"Stop That"	Paul Lawrence Jones III	6:37
7.	"Get Up off Your Love"	Paul Lawrence Jones III, Arthur "Sonny" Moore	4:38
8.	"I'm Just Warmin' Up"	Barbara Wyrick	4:36

2010 remastered bonus tracks
No.	Title	Length
9.	"Love Come Down" (12" Version)	6:15
10.	"Get Loose" (U.S. 12" Vocal Mix)	5:33
11.	"Betcha She Don't Love You" (U.S. 12" Instrumental Mix)	6:19
12.	"Love Come Down" (12" Instrumental Mix)	5:52

== Chart performance ==
Chart (1982)	Peak
U.S. Billboard Top LPs	27
U.S. Billboard Top Black LPs	1

Singles

Year	Single	Peak chart positions		
Year	Single	US	US R&B	US Dance
1982	"Love Come Down"	17	1	1
1982	"Betcha She Don't Love You"	49	2	—
1983	"Get Loose"	—	61	—

== See also ==
- List of number-one R&B albums of 1982 (U.S.)
