= Evelyn "Champagne" King =

American singer (born 1960)

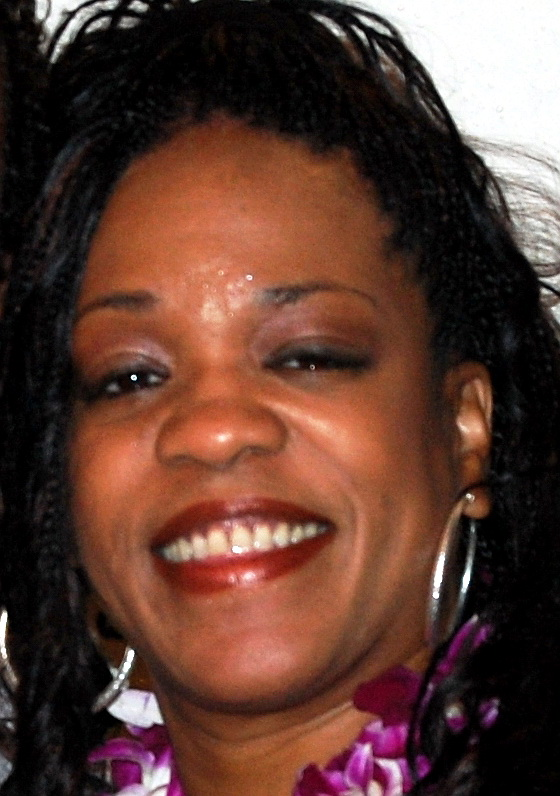
- King in 2008

Background information
- Also known as: Evelyn King
- Born: July 1, 1960 (age 66); New York City, U.S.
- Origin: Philadelphia, Pennsylvania, U.S.
- Genres: R&B; disco; pop; soul; post-disco
- Occupations: Singer; songwriter
- Years active: 1976–present
- Labels: RCA Victor (US, Canada, UK); EMI America; Expansion; RNB Entertainment Group
- Formerly of: First Ladies of Disco

Evelyn "Champagne" King (born July 1, 1960) is an American singer. Her first hit was the disco single "Shame", which was released in 1977, at the height of disco's popularity. King had other hits from the early to mid-1980s, including "I'm in Love" (1981), "Love Come Down" (1982), and "Your Personal Touch" (1985).

== Biography ==
=== Life ===
Evelyn King was born on July 1, 1960, in The Bronx, New York City to Johnniea and Erik King. She was raised in Philadelphia. She is one of eight children. King's childhood nickname was Bubbles. Her uncle Avon Long had played the part of Sportin' Life in the first Broadway revival of Porgy and Bess and worked with Lena Horne at the Cotton Club. Her father was a back-up singer for groups at Harlem's Apollo Theater. Her mother managed a group named Quality Red.

King was discovered while working with her mother at Philadelphia International Records as an office cleaner. Producer Theodore T. Life overheard her singing in a washroom and began coaching her. Eventually she signed a production deal with Life's Galaxy Productions and a recording contract with RCA Records.

In 1990, King married smooth jazz guitarist Freddie Fox. In 1997, she lost three family members to various illnesses. In 1987 her daughter Johnniea was born with brain damage and other health problems, dying two years later.

=== Career ===
At the beginning of her career the name Evelyn King sounded "too grown-up" so the name "Champagne" was added. King released her debut studio album, Smooth Talk, in 1977. It included the song "Shame", which is her only top-ten on the Billboard Hot 100, peaking at No. 9; the song also reached No. 7 Soul and No. 8 on the dance chart. The record was eventually certified gold. Another single from that album, "I Don't Know If It's Right", peaked at No. 23 on the Billboard Hot 100 and No. 7 Soul; it would become her second certified gold single. In 1981, the single "I'm in Love" was released from the same-titled album; it reached No. 1 on the R&B singles chart and dance chart in August of that year; it also peaked at No. 40 on the pop chart.

In 1982, King released the album, Get Loose. It yielded a top-twenty pop and No. 1 soul hit with the single, "Love Come Down". The song also peaked at No. 1 on the dance chart and reached the UK Singles Chart top-ten, peaking at No. 7 for three weeks. The follow-up, "Betcha She Don't Love You", peaked at No. 2 on the Soul chart and No. 49 on the pop chart. From the mid- to late 1980s, King would continue to chart on the Soul chart, placing eight singles in the Soul top-twenty, with three making it to the top-ten.

On September 20, 2004, King's "Shame" became one of the first records to be inducted into the Dance Music Hall of Fame at a ceremony held in New York's Spirit club.

=== Health crisis and return to music ===
In 2006, King had a uterine fibroid. She had to be resuscitated after her breathing stopped. She said that it was akin to "having a baby inside" of her.

On August 14, 2007, King released her first studio album in 12 years, Open Book. It featured the single "The Dance", which peaked at No. 12 on the Hot Dance Club Play Chart. In 2011, King also collaborated with deep house producer Miguel Migs, on the track "Everybody", which was included on his third studio album Outside the Skyline. "Everybody" was released as a single on July 19, 2011.

In 2015, King formed a supergroup with disco singers Martha Wash and Linda Clifford called First Ladies of Disco. The group's debut single "Show Some Love," released in March 2015, peaked at No. 6 on the Dance chart. The group embarked on its first tour together in 2017. In December 2017, King left the group.

== Discography ==
=== Studio albums ===
Year	Title	Peak chart positions					Certifications	Record label
Year	Title	US	US R&B	CAN	NZ	UK	Certifications	Record label
1977	Smooth Talk	14	8	24	—	—	RIAA: Gold	RCA
1979	Music Box	35	12	45	—	—	RIAA: Gold	RCA
1980	Call on Me	124	58	—	—	—		RCA
1981	I'm in Love	28	6	—	—	—		RCA
1982	Get Loose	27	1	—	45	35	RIAA: Gold	RCA
1983	Face to Face	91	24	—	—	—		RCA
1984	So Romantic	203	38	—	—	—		RCA
1985	A Long Time Coming (A Change Is Gonna Come)	—	38	—	—	—		RCA
1988	Flirt	192	20	—	—	—		EMI-Manhattan
1989	The Girl Next Door	—	—	—	—	—		EMI-USA
1995	I'll Keep a Light On	—	—	—	—	—		Expansion
2007	Open Book	—	—	—	—	—		Big Day/Jaggo
"—" denotes a recording that did not chart or was not released in that territory.

=== Compilations ===
- The Best of Evelyn "Champagne" King (1990, RCA)
- Love Come Down: The Best of Evelyn "Champagne" King (1993, RCA)
- Let's Get Funky (1997, BMG)
- Greatest Hits (2001, RCA)
- Platinum & Gold Collection (2003, BMG Heritage)
- Legends (2005, Sony BMG)
- If You Want My Lovin' (2006, Sony Music Special Products)
- Action: The Evelyn "Champagne" King Anthology - 1977-1986 (2014, BBR)
- The Essential Evelyn "Champagne" King (2015, Legacy)
- The Complete RCA Hits and More! (2016, Real Gone Music)

=== Singles ===
Year	Title	Peak chart positions									Certifications	Album
Year	Title	US	US R&B	US Dan	AUS	CAN	IRE	NL	NZ	UK	Certifications	Album
1977	"Shame"	9	7	8	72	16	—	26	—	39	RIAA: Gold; MC: Gold	Smooth Talk
1978	"I Don't Know If It's Right"	23	7	25	—	17	—	—	38	67	RIAA: Gold	Smooth Talk
1978	"Dancin', Dancin', Dancin'"	—	—	—	—	—	—	—	—	—		Smooth Talk
1979	"Music Box"	75	14	78	—	—	—	—	—	—		Music Box
1979	"Out There"	—	34	—	—	—	—	—	—	—		Music Box
1980	"Let's Get Funky Tonight"	—	34	12	—	—	—	—	—	—		Call on Me
1980	"I Need Your Love"	—	—	—	—	—	—	—	—	—		Call on Me
1981	"I'm in Love"	40	1	1	—	—	—	—	—	27		I'm in Love
1981	"If You Want My Lovin'"	—	—	—	—	—	—	—	—	43		I'm in Love
1981	"Don't Hide Our Love"	—	28	—	—	—	—	—	—	—		I'm in Love
1982	"Spirit of the Dancer"	—	51	54	—	—	—	—	—	—		I'm in Love
1982	"Love Come Down"	17	1	1	—	44	13	—	12	7	BPI: Silver	Get Loose
1982	"Betcha She Don't Love You"	49	2	—	—	—	—	—	—	—		Get Loose
1982	"Back to Love"	—	—	—	—	—	—	—	—	40		Get Loose
1983	"Get Loose"	—	61	—	—	—	—	—	—	45		Get Loose
1983	"Action"	75	16	13	—	—	—	—	—	—		Face to Face
1984	"Shake Down"	107	12	34	—	—	—	—	—	—		Face to Face
1984	"Teenager"	—	28	—	—	—	—	—	—	—		Face to Face
1984	"Just for the Night"	107	16	45	—	—	—	—	—	—		So Romantic
1984	"I'm So Romantic"	—	—	—	—	—	—	—	—	76		So Romantic
1985	"Out of Control"	—	54	14	—	—	—	—	—	—		So Romantic
1985	"Give Me One Reason"	—	—	—	—	—	—	—	—	93		So Romantic
1985	"Till Midnight"	—	57	—	—	—	—	—	—	—		So Romantic
1985	"Give It Up"	—	—	—	—	—	—	—	—	—		Fright Night
1985	"Your Personal Touch"	86	9	5	—	—	—	—	—	37		A Long Time Coming (A Change Is Gonna Come)
1986	"High Horse"	—	19	12	—	—	—	—	—	55		A Long Time Coming (A Change Is Gonna Come)
1986	"Slow Down"	—	81	—	—	—	—	—	—	—		A Long Time Coming (A Change Is Gonna Come)
1988	"Flirt"	—	3	—	—	—	—	—	—	—		Flirt
1988	"Hold on to What You've Got"	—	8	5	—	—	—	41	—	47		Flirt
1988	"Kisses Don't Lie"	—	17	—	—	—	—	—	—	—		Flirt
1989	"Day to Day"	—	80	—	—	—	—	—	—	—		The Girl Next Door
1990	"Do Right"	—	—	—	—	—	—	—	—	—		The Girl Next Door
1992	"Shame (Hardcore Mix)" (Altern 8 vs Evelyn King)	—	—	—	—	—	—	—	—	74		—N/a
1995	"I Think About You"	—	—	—	—	—	—	—	—	—		I'll Keep a Light On
1996	"One More Time" (with Divas of Color)	—	—	10	—	—	—	—	—	94		—N/a
2008	"The Dance"	—	—	12	—	—	—	—	—	—		Open Book
2011	"Everybody" (with Miguel Migs)	—	—	—	—	—	—	—	—	—		Outside the Skyline
"—" denotes a recording that did not chart or was not released in that territory.

== Awards and nominations ==
Year	Award	Category	Nominated work	Result
1979	American Music Awards	Favorite Disco Song	"Shame"	Nominated
1983	American Music Awards	Favorite Soul/R&B Female Artist	Herself	Nominated
1983	American Music Awards	Favorite Soul/R&B Song	"Love Come Down"	Nominated
2004	Dance Music Hall of Fame		"Shame"	Inducted
2023	The National R&B Music Society	Living Legend Award	Herself	Honored

== See also ==
- Timeline of Billboard number-one dance songs
- List of artists who reached number one on the U.S. Dance Club Songs chart
