= All That I Am (Joe song) =

Single by Joe

from the album All That I Am
- Released: March 31, 1998
- Genre: R&B
- Length: 4:12
- Label: Jive
- Songwriter(s): Larry Lofton; Mattias Gustafsson
- Producer(s): Joe; Edwin "Tony" Nicholas

Joe singles chronology
"Still Not a Player" (1998)	"All That I Am" (1998)	"No One Else Comes Close" (1998)

"All That I Am" is a song by American R&B singer Joe. It was written by Larry Lofton and Brittany Providence for his same-titled second studio album (1997), while production was helmed by Joe and Edwin "Tony" Nicholas. Released as the album's sixth and final single, it reached number 52 on the UK Singles Chart.

== Track listings ==
CD single
No.	Title	Length
1.	"All That I Am"	4:11
2.	"All The Things (Your Man Won't Do)" (Broadcast Edit)	3:22
3.	"Sanctified Girl (Can't Fight This Feeling)" (N-Junction Remix)	4:33

== Credits and personnel ==
- Mattias Gustafsson – writer
- Jed Hackett – mastering
- Larry Lofton – writer
- Edwin "Tony" Nicholas – producer
- Gerard Smerek – mixing
- Joe Thomas – producer, vocals

== Charts ==
Chart (1997–98)	Peak position
UK Singles (OCC)	52
UK Dance (OCC)	30
UK Hip Hop/R&B (OCC)	14
US Adult R&B Songs (Billboard)	10
