= Booty Call (soundtrack) =

Booty Call: The Original Motion Picture Soundtrack

Soundtrack album by various artists
- Released: February 25, 1997
- Recorded: 1996
- Genre: R&B; hip hop
- Length: 63:41
- Label: Jive
- Producer: Benny Medina (exec.); James Lassiter (exec.); Jeff Pollack (exec.); Edwin "Tony" Nicholas; Gerald Levert; Rodney Jerkins; Dr. Ray; "Fitz" Gerald Scott; Holly Rob; KRS-One; Larry "Rock" Campbell; P.M. Dawn; R. Kelly; Shorty B; Steely & Clevie; Studio Ton; Timbaland; Too $hort

Singles from Booty Call
- 1. "Call Me" Released: 1997; 2. "Can We" Released: February 11, 1997; 3. "Don't Wanna Be a Player" Released: April 15, 1997

Professional ratings
Review scores
Source	Rating
AllMusic	4/5 stars

Booty Call: The Original Motion Picture Soundtrack is the soundtrack to the 1997 film Booty Call. It was released on February 25, 1997, through Jive Records and consisted of a blend of contemporary R&B and hip hop. The soundtrack was a success, peaking at 24 on the Billboard 200 and 4 on the Top R&B/Hip-Hop Albums. It was first certified Gold on April 28, 1997, before earning a Platinum certification on November 18, 1998.

Three singles also made it to the charts: "Call Me" by Too Short and Lil' Kim, "Can We" by SWV featuring Missy Elliott, and "Don't Wanna Be a Player" by Joe.

== Track listing ==
#	Title	Performer(s)	Composer(s)	Producer(s)	Time
1	"Can We"	SWV & Missy Elliott	Missy Elliott, Timothy Mosley	Timbaland	4:54
2	"Don't Wanna Be a Player"	Joe	Joseph Thomas, Rodney Jerkins	Rodney Jerkins	5:13
3	"Baby, Baby, Baby, Baby, Baby..."	R. Kelly	Robert Kelly	R. Kelly	4:21
4	"Fire and Desire"	Johnny Gill & Coko	Rick James	Gerald Levert, Edwin "Tony" Nicholas	6:17
5	"Don't Stop, Don't Quit"	1 Accord	Rodney Jerkins, LaShawn Daniels, Japhe Tejeda, Fred Jerkins III	Rodney Jerkins	4:05
6	"Feel Good"	Silk	"Fitz" Gerald Scott, Gary Jenkins	"Fitz" Gerald Scott	4:55
7	"Hold That Thought"	Gerald Levert	Gerald Levert, Edwin "Tony" Nicholas	Gerald Levert, Edwin "Tony" Nicholas	4:04
8	"Let Me See You Squirrel"	Squirrel	Holly Rob, Dr. Ray, Squirrel, Ricky Walters	Holly Rob & Dr. Ray	4:19
9	"If You Stay"	Backstreet Boys	Attrell Cordes, Roy Ayers, James Bedford, Sylvia Striplin	P.M. Dawn	4:21
10	"Call Me"	Too Short & Lil' Kim	Todd Shaw, Kimberly Jones, Stuart Jordan	Shorty B & Too Short	5:00
11	"Don't Blame It On Me"	B-Legit & E-40	Earl Stevens, Brandt Jones, Marvin Whiteman	Studio Ton, 40 Fonzarelli (co.)	4:39
12	"(I'll Be Yo') Huckleberry"	D-Shot, E-40, Levitti & The Saulter Twins	Danell Stevens, Earl Stevens, Marvin Whiteman, Felton Pilate	Studio Ton, D-Shot (co.)	4:39
13	"Plan Up Your Family"	KRS-One	Lawrence Parker, Lionel Richie, Greg Phillinganes	KRS-One	4:39
14	"Chocolate"	L.A. Ganz	Lawrence Young, Adrian Williams, Warren Killebrew, Larry Campbell, Corwyn Hodge	Larry "Rock" Campbell, L.A. Ganz (co.)	3:50
15	"Looking for Love"	Whitey Don	Whitey Don, Wycliffe Johnson, Cleveland Browne	Steely & Clevie	4:34
16	"When I Rise"	Crooked	G. Lock, Y. Hu, R. Woodman, M. Allong	Cursdog & Rod C.	4:11

Sample credits

- "Let Me See You Squirrel" contains samples from:
  - "Mona Lisa", written by Ricky Walters, and performed by Slick Rick.
  - "Children's Story", written by Ricky Walters, and performed by Slick Rick.
  - "Bang Zoom (Let's Go)"; written by Full Force, Adelaida Martinez, and Howard Thompson; and performed by The Real Roxanne.
- "If You Stay" contains a sample from "You Can't Turn Me Away"; written by Roy Ayers, James Bedford, and Sylvia Striplin; and performed by Sylvia Striplin.
- "(I'll Be Yo') Huckleberry" contains a portion of the composition, "(Let Me Put) Love on Your Mind", written by Felton Pilate.
- "Plan Up Your Family" contains a sample from "Love Will Find a Way", written by Lionel Richie and Greg Phillinganes, and performed by Lionel Richie.

== Charts ==
=== Weekly charts ===
Chart (1997)	Peak position
US Billboard 200	24
US Top R&B/Hip-Hop Albums (Billboard)	4

=== Year-end charts ===
Chart (1997)	Position
US Billboard 200	118
US Top R&B/Hip-Hop Albums (Billboard)	30

== Certifications ==
Region	Certification	Certified units/sales
United States (RIAA)	Platinum	1,000,000^{^}
^{^} Shipments figures based on certification alone.
