= Your Personal Touch =

- Artwork for the U.S. 12-inch single

Single by Evelyn "Champagne" King

from the album A Long Time Coming
- Released: October 1985
- Genre: R&B
- Length: 6:25 (12-inch version)
- Label: RCA Victor PW-14202 (US)
- Songwriters: Allen George, Fred McFarlane
- Producers: Allen George, Fred McFarlane

Evelyn "Champagne" King singles chronology
| "Give It Up" (1985) | "Your Personal Touch" (1985) | "High Horse" (1986) |

"Your Personal Touch" is a song recorded by American R&B singer Evelyn "Champagne" King. The song, written by Allen George and Fred McFarlane, was released in 1985 by RCA Victor.

The song is also included on her eighth studio album A Long Time Coming (1985).

Although "Your Personal Touch" did not top the charts, it proved a moderate success for King. "Your Personal Touch" reached the top ten of the Billboard R&B and Dance charts, peaking at #9 and #5, respectively. It also reached #86 on the Hot 100 and #37 on the UK singles chart.

== Track listing ==
=== 1985 releases ===
12-inch vinyl

- US: RCA Victor / PW-14202

Side one
| No. | Title | Length |
|---|---|---|
| 1. | ""Your Personal Touch" (LP Version)" | 5:48 |

Side two
| No. | Title | Length |
|---|---|---|
| 1. | ""Your Personal Touch" (Dance Version)" | 4:48 |

Side three
| No. | Title | Length |
|---|---|---|
| 1. | ""Talking In My Sleep"" | 4:59 |

7-inch vinyl

- UK: RCA Records / PB 49915

Side one
| No. | Title | Length |
|---|---|---|
| 1. | ""Your Personal Touch"" | 3:52 |

Side two
| No. | Title | Length |
|---|---|---|
| 1. | ""Talking In My Sleep"" | 4:59 |

== Personnel ==
- Performer: Evelyn King
- Producer: Allen George
- Producer: Fred McFarlane
- Producer: Jimmy Douglass
- Arranged, mixed by Allen George and Fred McFarlane for Terrible Two Productions

== Chart performance ==
| Chart (1985) | Peak position |
|---|---|
| US Billboard Black Singles | 9 |
| US Billboard Hot Dance Music/Maxi-Singles Sales | 48 |
| US Billboard Hot Dance Music/Club Play | 5 |
| UK Singles Chart | 37 |
| Chart (1986) | Peak position |
| US Billboard Hot 100 | 86 |
