= If You Want My Lovin' =

1981 song performed by Evelyn King

Song by Evelyn "Champagne" King

from the album I'm in Love
- Released: April 3, 1981
- Genre: Boogie
- Length: 4:18 (LP Version)
- Label: RCA Victor
- Songwriters: Morrie Brown; Paul Lawrence Jones III

"If You Want My Lovin'" is a song released by American singer Evelyn "Champagne" King. Released on April 3, 1981. The song appears on her fourth studio album I'm in Love. The single version of "If You Want My Lovin'" was the follow-up to her charting single "I'm in Love," but less successful.

== Single version ==
"If You Want My Lovin'"

Single by Evelyn "Champagne" King
- Released: 1981
- Length: 4:21
- Songwriters: Morrie Brown; Lawrence Jones III

Evelyn "Champagne" King singles chronology
"I'm in Love" (1981)	"If You Want My Lovin'" (1981)	"Don't Hide Our Love" (1981)

"If You Want My Lovin'" was also released as a single. This version of "If You Want My Lovin'" is the less-successful follow-up to Evelyn's charting single "I'm In Love."

=== Track listing ===
12" version

12"	1. "If You Want My Lovin'" (Morrie Brown, Lawrence Jones) - ?:??; 2. "Long Time Waiting On You" (Theodore Life) - ?:??

7" version

7"	1. "If You Want My Lovin'" (Morrie Brown, Lawrence Jones) - 4:18; 2. "Long Time Waiting On You" (Theodore Life) - ?:??

== Personnel ==
- Percussion – Bashiri Johnson
- Producer, arranger, handclaps, lyrics by – Morrie Brown
- Assistant producer, arranger, keyboards, lyrics by, music by – Lawrence Jones
- Assistant engineer – Cheryl Smith, Dennis O'Donnell
- Mixed by, recorded by – "Magic Hands", Steve Goldman
- Mastered by – George Marino
- Assistant producer, backing vocals, handclaps, keyboards, Moog synthesizer – Kashif
- Guitar – Ira Siegel
- Additional engineer – Pete Sobel
- String arrangement – Ralph Schuckett
- Backing vocals – B.J. Nelson, Evelyn King, Rochele Cappelli
- Drums, handclaps – Leslie Ming
