= Call Me (Too Short and Lil' Kim song) =

1997 single by Too Short and Lil' Kim

Single by Too Short and Lil' Kim

from the album Booty Call: The Original Motion Picture Soundtrack
- Released: 1997
- Genre: Dirty rap
- Length: 5:00
- Label: Jive
- Songwriters: Todd Shaw; Kimberly Jones; Stuart Jordan
- Producers: Shorty B; Too Short

Too Short singles chronology
"Rapper's Ball" (1996)	"Call Me" (1997)	"Game Over" (1997)

Lil' Kim singles chronology
"Not Tonight" (Ladies Night remix) (1997)	"Call Me" (1997)	"It's All About the Benjamins" (1997)

"Call Me" is a song by American rappers Too Short and Lil' Kim. It is the lead single from the soundtrack of the 1997 film Booty Call. The song was produced by Shorty B and Too Short.

== Background ==
When Jive Records requested that Too Short work with Lil' Kim on "Call Me", the latter's then on-and-off boyfriend and fellow rapper The Notorious B.I.G. first met with Too Short to find out what they were planning. After Short explained he was only interested in recording the song with Kim, B.I.G. approved the collaboration.

On MTV's "RapFix Live" series, Too Short revealed the first version of "Call Me" did not meet others' expectations for a sexually explicit song. He and Lil' Kim later re-recorded the song; Short said, "We tried to, like, have sex on the song. It wasn't physical sex, but we tried to make musical sex. I think we achieved it."

== Charts ==
Chart (1997)	Peak position
US Billboard Hot 100	90
US Hot R&B/Hip-Hop Songs (Billboard)	30
US Hot Rap Songs (Billboard)	39
