= Call on Me (album) =

Call On Me

Studio album by Evelyn "Champagne" King
- Released: September 8, 1980
- Recorded: 1980
- Studios: Record Plant Studios; Secret Sound Studios; RCA Studios, New York City
- Genre: Disco
- Length: 40:04
- Label: RCA Victor
- Producers: Theodore Life; George Tindley

Evelyn "Champagne" King chronology
Music Box (1979)	Call On Me (1980)	I'm in Love (1981)

Professional ratings
Review scores
Source	Rating
AllMusic	2/5 stars

Call on Me is the third studio album by American R&B singer Evelyn "Champagne" King, released on September 8, 1980, by RCA Records. It was produced by Theodore Life and George Tindley.

The album peaked at No. 58 on the R&B albums chart. It also reached No. 124 on the Billboard 200. It produced the single "Let's Get Funky Tonight".

== Track listing ==
Side one
No.	Title	Writer(s)	Length
1.	"Let's Get Funky Tonight"	Theodore Life; Hassan Ali; Kwame Hadi; King	3:36
2.	"Your Kind of Loving"	Theodore Life; Frank Snowden	3:51
3.	"Call on Me"	Theodore Life; Theodore Life III; Nat Lee	5:15
4.	"I Need Your Love"	Theodore Life; Frank Alstin Jr.; George Tindley	6:18

Side two
No.	Title	Writer(s)	Length
5.	"Talk Don't Hurt Nobody"	Theodore Life; Joe Freeman	6:43
6.	"Just a Little Bit of Love"	Brian Holland; Edward Holland	3:40
7.	"Bedroom Eyes"	Bill Seidman; Christine Faith	4:41
8.	"Universal Girl"	Theodore Life; John H. Fitch, Jr.	6:00
Total length:			40:04

== Credits ==
- Strings and horns – George Andrews
- Art direction – J.J. Stelmach

== Charts ==
Chart (1980)	Peak
U.S. Billboard Top LPs	124
U.S. Billboard Top Soul LPs	58
