= Yeah! Yeah! Yeah! (Simone Hines song) =

1997 single by Simone Hines

Single by Simone Hines

from the album Simone Hines
- Released: September 2, 1997
- Recorded: 1997
- Genre: R&B
- Length: 4:24
- Label: Epic
- Songwriter(s): Rodney Jerkins
- Producer(s): Rodney Jerkins

Simone Hines singles chronology
"Yeah! Yeah! Yeah!" (1997)	"Only Fools Fool Around" (1998)

Music video
- "Yeah! Yeah! Yeah!" on YouTube

"Yeah! Yeah! Yeah!" is a song performed by American contemporary R&B singer Simone Hines. It is the opening track on her eponymous debut album and was issued as the album's first single. The song was her only appearance on Billboard, peaking at #38 on the R&B chart in 1997.

== Music video ==
The official music video for the song was directed by Christopher Erskin.

== Chart positions ==
Chart (1997)	Peak position
US Hot R&B/Hip-Hop Singles & Tracks (Billboard)	38
