= Simone Hines =

American contemporary R&B singer

- Born: 1975 (age 50–51); New Jersey, United States
- Genres: R&B
- Years active: 1997–1998
- Label: Epic

Simone Hines is an American contemporary R&B singer who was most active in the late 1990s. Her only charting single was her debut single "Yeah! Yeah! Yeah!", which peaked at No. 38 on the Billboard R&B chart in 1997.

== Discography ==
=== Albums ===
- Simone Hines (1997)

=== Singles ===
| Year | Song | Peak chart positions | Album |
| Year | Song | U.S. R&B | Album |
| 1997 | "Yeah! Yeah! Yeah!" | 38 | Simone Hines |
| 1998 | "Only Fools Fool Around" | — | Simone Hines |
