= I'm in Love (Evelyn King song) =

Single by Evelyn King

from the album I'm in Love
- B-side: "The Other Side of Love"
- Released: 1981
- Genre: Post-disco; R&B
- Length: 5:01
- Label: RCA Victor
- Songwriter: Kashif
- Producer: Morrie Brown

Evelyn King singles chronology
"Let's Get Funky Tonight" (1980)	"I'm in Love" (1981)	"If You Want My Lovin'" (1981)

"I'm in Love" is a 1981 single by American singer Evelyn King. The single was a hit on three different music charts in the United States, hitting number one on both the soul and dance charts and number 40 on the Billboard Hot 100. It was the first of two chart entries by King to reach number one on both the soul and dance charts.

== Track listing ==
12" single PD-12244 (US)

A-side
No.	Title	Length
1.	"I'm in Love"	5:53

B-side
No.	Title	Length
1.	"The Other Side of Love"	4:57

7" single PB-12243 (US)

A-side
No.	Title	Length
1.	"I'm in Love"	3:49

B-side
No.	Title	Length
1.	"The Other Side of Love"	3:58

== Credits and personnel ==
- Backing vocals – B.J. Nelson
- Guitar – Ira Siegel
- Drums – Leslie Ming
- Handclaps – Kashif, Lawrence Jones III, Morrie Brown
- Percussion instrument – Bashiri Johnson
- Acoustic piano, electric piano (Fender Rhodes), analog synthesizer (Prophet-5, Moog), analog bass synthesizer (Minimoog) – Kashif
- Music arrangement – Kashif
- Lyrics and music – Kashif Saleem
- Producer – Morrie Brown, Lawrence Jones III (assoc.), Kashif (assoc.)
- Recording studio – Celestial Sounds, New York City
- Sound recording – "Magic Hands", Steve Goldman
- Engineers – Pete Sobel, Cheryl Smith, Dennis O'Donnell
- Produced for Mighty M Productions (Morrie Brown + Kashif + Paul Lawrence Jones III).

Post-production

- Audio mastering – Sterling Sound, New York City
- Audio mixing – Celestial Sounds, New York City

== Charts ==
Chart (1981)	Peak position
UK Singles (Official Charts)	27
US Billboard Hot 100	40
US Billboard Hot Soul Singles	1
US Billboard Hot Dance Club Play	1
US Cash Box	44
US Record World	33

== Covers and samples ==
- Jamaican singer Jennifer Lara released her version of the song (titled "I Am In Love") on a Studio One single in 1981.
- Janet Jackson sampled "I'm In Love" in her 2004 song "R&B Junkie."

== See also ==
- List of Billboard number-one dance singles of 1981
- List of Hot Soul Singles number ones of 1981
- List of post-disco artists
