= A Long Time Coming (A Change Is Gonna Come) =

Studio album by Evelyn "Champagne" King
- Released: October 28, 1985
- Recorded: 1985
- Genre: R&B
- Length: 40:50
- Label: RCA
- Producers: Theodore Life; Hawk; René & Angela; Bobby Watson; Allen George; Fred McFarlane

Evelyn "Champagne" King chronology
So Romantic (1984)	A Long Time Coming (A Change Is Gonna Come) (1985)	Flirt (1988)

Singles from A Long Time Coming (A Change Is Gonna Come)
- 1. "Your Personal Touch" Released: October 1985; 2. "High Horse" Released: 1985; 3. "Slow Down" Released: 1985

Professional ratings
Review scores
Source	Rating
AllMusic	1.5/5 stars

A Long Time Coming (A Change Is Gonna Come) is the eighth studio album by American R&B singer Evelyn "Champagne" King, released on October 28, 1985, by RCA Records. It was produced by Theodore Life, Hawk, René & Angela, Bobby Watson, Allen George, and Fred McFarlane.

== History ==
The album peaked at No. 38 on the R&B albums chart. It produced the hit singles "Your Personal Touch", "High Horse", and "Slow Down". The album was digitally remastered and reissued on CD with bonus tracks in 2008 by Bluebird Records and again in 2014 by Funky Town Grooves Records. The latter was issued on two CDs, adding the non-LP track "Take a Chance" (the B-side of both the 7" and 12" versions of "High Horse") and "Give It Up" from the soundtrack of the supernatural horror film Fright Night, which was also released as a single in 1985.

== Track listing ==
Side one
No.	Title	Writer(s)	Length
1.	"Chemistry of Love"	Evelyn "Champagne" King; Matt Thomas; Larry Taylor; Theodore Life	4:38
2.	"A Change Is Gonna Come"	Sam Cooke	4:36
3.	"Spellbound"	René Moore; Angela Winbush	3:31
4.	"If You Find the Time"	Theodore Life; Larry Taylor; Tony Pritchette; Charles Kennedy	4:45
5.	"Slow Down"	Bruce Gaitsch; Keithen Carter	3:43

Side two
No.	Title	Writer(s)	Length
6.	"If I Let Myself Go"	Sheree Sano; Jose Gomez	4:28
7.	"Your Personal Touch"	Allen George; Fred McFarlane	5:48
8.	"I'm Scared"	Kenneth Gilkes	4:55
9.	"High Horse"	Allen George; Fred McFarlane	4:26
Total length:			40:50

2008 remastered bonus tracks
No.	Title	Length
10.	"Your Personal Touch" (Dance Remix)	4:45
11.	"Take a Chance" (Long Version)	5:19

2014 Remastered Bonus CD
No.	Title	Length
1.	"Slow Down" (Remixed Version)	6:52
2.	"Slow Down" (Dub A)	4:28
3.	"Slow Down" (Dub B)	4:44
4.	"Slow Down" (Edited Remix Version)	3:49
5.	"Better Deal" (7 inch Version)	4:01
6.	"Take a Chance" (7 inch Version)	4:34
7.	"Take a Chance" (12 inch Version)	5:23
8.	"High Horse" (Remix Version)	6:14
9.	"High Horse" (Dub Version)	6:02
10.	"Give It Up" (7 inch Version)	3:52
11.	"Give It Up" (Killer Dance Mix)	5:48
12.	"Give It Up" (Dub Mix)	4:20
13.	"Your Personal Touch" (Edited Version)	4:01
14.	"Your Personal Touch" (Dance Version)	4:52

== Charts ==
Chart (1985)	Peak
U.S. Billboard Top Black LPs	38
