= All the Things (Your Man Won't Do) =

1996 single by Joe

Single by Joe

from the album Don't Be a Menace to South Central While Drinking Your Juice in the Hood: The Soundtrack and All That I Am
- Released: January 30, 1996
- Recorded: 1995
- Genre: R&B
- Length: 6:22 (album version); 4:50 (single edit)
- Label: Jive
- Songwriters: Joe Thomas; Joshua Thompson; Michele Williams
- Producers: Joe Thomas; Joshua Thompson

Joe singles chronology
"All or Nothing" (1994)	"All the Things (Your Man Won't Do)" (1996)	"Don't Wanna Be a Player" (1997)

Music video
- "All the Things (Your Man Won't Do)" on YouTube

"All the Things (Your Man Won't Do)" is a song by American R&B singer Joe. It was co-written by him with Joshua Thompson and Michele Williams, and co-produced with Thompson. The song originally appeared on the soundtrack to the film Don't Be a Menace to South Central While Drinking Your Juice in the Hood and was later included as the opening track on Joe's second studio album, All That I Am (1997). It was his first hit on the US Billboard Hot 100, peaking at number 11 in 1996. The single also reached number nine on the US Cash Box Top 100 and was certified gold by the Recording Industry Association of America (RIAA) on April 10, 1996. The accompanying music video was directed by American director Paul Hunter.

== Track listings ==
CD single
No.	Title	Length
1.	"All the Things (Your Man Won't Do)"	3:22
2.	"All That I Am"	4:11

Cassette single
No.	Title	Length
1.	"All the Things (Your Man Won't Do)" (Video Version)	4:11
2.	"All the Things (Your Man Won't Do)" (Radio Edit)	4:50

== Credits and personnel ==
- Special Tee – mixing
- Joshua Thompson – producer, writer
- Joe Thomas – producer, vocals, writer
- Michele Williams – writer

== Charts ==
=== Weekly charts ===
Chart (1996)	Peak position
Australia (ARIA)	178
UK Singles (Official Charts)	34
UK Dance (Official Charts)	15
UK Hip Hop/R&B (Official Charts)	5
US Adult R&B Songs (Billboard)	1
US Billboard Hot 100	11
US Hot R&B/Hip-Hop Songs (Billboard)	2
US Rhythmic Airplay (Billboard)	14
US Cash Box Top 100	9

=== Year-end charts ===
Chart (1996)	Position
US Billboard Hot 100	55
US Hot R&B/Hip-Hop Songs (Billboard)	2

== Certifications ==
Region	Certification	Certified units/sales
United States (RIAA)	Gold	500,000^{^}
^{^} Shipments figures based on certification alone.
