= Smooth Talk (album) =

- Standard artwork; the late-1970s US reissues and some overseas vinyl releases used a different artwork

Studio album by Evelyn "Champagne" King
- Released: August 17, 1977
- Recorded: 1977
- Studios: RCA Studios, New York City, New City; Alpha International, Philadelphia, Pennsylvania
- Genres: Soul, disco
- Length: 41:11 (based on vinyl release with only 12" mixes of singles)
- Labels: RCA Victor; Big Break Records
- Producer: Theodore Life

Evelyn "Champagne" King chronology
Smooth Talk (1977)	Music Box (1979)

Singles from Smooth Talk
- 1. "Shame" Released: September 20, 1977; 2. "I Don't Know If It's Right" Released: October 1978

Smooth Talk is the debut studio album by American R&B singer Evelyn "Champagne" King, released on August 17, 1977, by RCA Records and produced by Theodore Life. It contains singles "Shame", also one of King's signature songs, and "I Don't Know If It's Right", both of which were hits in the United States and Canada. Outside North America in music charts, "Shame" performed modestly in a few European countries, while the latter performed poorly in British and New Zealand charts.

== Songs ==
In the Billboard charts, "Shame" peaked at number nine in the Hot 100, number seven in the Hot Soul Singles, and number eight in the Disco Action, In Canada's RPM charts, "Shame" peaked at number sixteen in Top 100 Singles and number five in the Dance/Urban chart. It also peaked at number thirty-nine in the UK Singles Chart, number eighteen in the Dutch Top 40, number twenty-six in the Netherlands's Singles Top 100, and number twelve in Belgium's Ultratop Top 50 Singles. The song was certified gold by the RIAA on August 11, 1978, became one of King's signature songs, and would be later covered by Zhané for the 1994 film A Low Down Dirty Shame and then Kim Wilde in 1996.

"I Don't Know If It's Right" peaked number twenty-three in the Billboard Hot 100, number seven in the Hot Soul Singles. and number twenty-five in the Disco Action. It was positioned at number twenty-one on the year-end top 50 Soul Singles of 1979. The song was also certified gold by the RIAA on February 22, 1979. In Canada, the song entered the RPM Top 100 Singles at number ninety-four on the week ending January 13, 1979, and peaked at number seventeen for two weeks until the week ending April 14. It also entered the RPM Adult Oriented Playlist at number forty-three on the week ending January 20 that same year and peaked at number six on the week ending March 31. It also reached number eleven on the RPM Dance/Urban chart on the week ending October 28, 1978, a year prior. It was position at number 130 on the RPM year-end Top 200 Singles of 1979. The song peaked at number sixty-seven in the UK Singles Chart. It also entered the New Zealand Singles Chart at number thirty-eight, its peak position, on the week ending May 6 that same year and fell from its position a week later.

The titular song "Smooth Talk" contains "undulating drum fills and serene and stylish vocal arrangement." Another song "The Show Is Over" would be later sampled for Ice Cube's "You Know How We Do It" (1994).

== Album chart performance and releases ==
The album was released in 1977 and peaked at number fourteen on the Billboard 200 for the week ending September 23, 1978 and number eight on the Soul Albums chart for the week ending July 15, 1978. In Billboard's year-end charts of 1978, it was positioned at number seventy-six on the year-end top 100 Pop Albums and number thirty-one on the year-end top 50 Soul Albums. It was also positioned at number twenty-five on the year-end top 50 Soul Albums of 1979. It was certified gold by the RIAA on September 6, 1978.

The album was digitally remastered and reissued on CD with bonus tracks in 2010 by Big Break Records. The original vinyl disc was reissued twice following the single releases of "Shame" and "I Don't Know If It's Right", in each case replacing the LP track version with the 12" remix version.

== Critical reception ==
Allmusic critic Justin Kantor rated the album four out of five stars, calling it "a fine catch for '70s R&B connoisseurs" and "a fun, satisfying listen for the body—if not a genius piece of soul," and highly praising the hit single "Shame". However, he considered several other tracks forgettable, like "Dancin', Dancin', Dancin'" and "'Til I Come off the Road."

== Track listing ==
Side one
No.	Title	Writer(s)	Length
1.	"Smooth Talk"	Theodore Life, Mike Holden, William Kimes	5:29
2.	"I Don't Know If It's Right" (original LP version)	Theodore Life, John H. Fitch, Jr.	4:17
3.	"Til I Come Off the Road"	Mike Holden, John H. Fitch, Jr., Theodore Life	2:38
4.	"Dancin', Dancin', Dancin'"	Theodore Life, Teddy Pendergrass	4:13

Side two
No.	Title	Writer(s)	Length
5.	"Shame" (original LP version)	John H. Fitch, Jr., Reuben Cross	4:38
6.	"Nobody Knows"	John H. Fitch, Jr., Reuben Cross, Theodore Life	4:31
7.	"We're Going to a Party"	Theodore Life, Aubrey Gravatt, Joe Freeman	3:48
8.	"The Show Is Over"	Theodore Life, Dexter Wansel	5:40
Total length:			35:14

1977–78 "repackage" edition
No.	Title	Length
2.	"I Don't Know If It's Right" (12" Disco Mix [in some "repackage" pressings])	8:19
5.	"Shame" (12" Disco Mix)	6:35

2010 remastered bonus tracks
No.	Title	Length
9.	"Shame" (12" Disco Mix)	6:33
10.	"I Don't Know If It's Right" (12" Disco Mix)	8:19
11.	"Shame" (Single Version)	2:54
12.	"I Don't Know If It's Right" (Single Version)	3:46

== Personnel ==
- Raymond Earl – bass
- John H. Fitch, Jr., Ronnie James, Theodore Life, Kim Miller – guitars
- Jerald Hill, Dennis Richardson – keyboards
- James Sigler – organ
- Dexter Wansel – electric piano
- Sam Peake – organ, electric piano, Clavinet
- James Lee Fuller, Larry Strickland – congas
- Scotty Miller – drums
- Johnny McCants – congas, percussion
- Don Renaldo and his Swinging Horns – horns
- Carla Benson, Evette Benton, Mikki Farrow, Joe Freeman, Lani Groves, Barbara Ingram, Theodore Life, M. Roberts, Bunny Sigler, Annie Sutton – background vocals
- Arnold Coley Jr., Morris Bailey, Sam Peake, Leon Mitchell – horn arrangements

== Charts ==
Chart (1978)	Peak
Billboard Top LPs	14
Billboard Top Soul LPs	8

Region	Certification	Certified units/sales
United States (RIAA)	Gold	500,000^{^}
^{^} Shipments figures based on certification alone.

Singles

Year	Single	Peak chart positions											Certifications
Year	Single	US	US R&B	US Dance	CA	CA Dance / Urban	CA Adult	UK	NL Top 40	NL Top 100	BE	NZ	US
1978	"Shame"	9	7	8	16	5	–	39	18	26	12	–	Gold
1979	"I Don't Know If It's Right"	23	7	25	17	11	6	67	–	–	–	38	Gold
