= Betcha She Don't Love You =

Single by Evelyn King

from the album Get Loose
- B-side: "I'm Just Warmin' Up"
- Released: January 1983
- Recorded: 1981–1982
- Genre: R&B
- Length: 5:04
- Label: RCA Victor
- Songwriter: Kashif
- Producer: Morrie Brown

Evelyn King singles chronology
"Love Come Down" (1982)	"Betcha She Don't Love You" (1983)	"Back to Love" (1982)

"Betcha She Don't Love You" is a song by American singer Evelyn King, released by RCA Records as the second single from her fifth studio album Get Loose (1982), the follow-up to "Love Come Down". The song was written and co-produced by American musician Kashif and talks about a boy going out with another girl who will break his heart. It reached number two on the US Billboard Black Singles chart and number 49 on the Hot 100 chart. A 12" extended mix of this song was included on King's Greatest Hits album.

== Charts ==
=== Weekly charts ===
Chart (1983)	Peak position
US Billboard Hot 100	49
US Billboard Black Singles	2
US Cash Box Top 100	36

== Sampling ==
In 1999, this song was sampled in "Bet She Don't Love You" by A+ featuring Joe. The song was also sampled in the song "If You Were My Man" by Monica on her 2010 album Still Standing.
