= Love Come Down =

1982 single by Evelyn King

- Side-A label of American 12-inch vinyl single

Single by Evelyn King

from the album Get Loose
- Released: July 1982
- Studio: Kashif's Celestial Sounds, New York, New York; The Power Station, New York, New York
- Genre: Post-disco
- Length: 3:43 (7-inch version); 6:07 (album version)
- Label: RCA Victor
- Songwriter: Kashif
- Producer: Morrie Brown

Evelyn King singles chronology
"Spirit of the Dancer" (1982)	"Love Come Down" (1982)	"Betcha She Don't Love You" (1982)

Music video
- "Love Come Down" on YouTube

"Love Come Down" is a song written by American musician Kashif. It was recorded by American singer Evelyn King for her fifth studio album, Get Loose (1982). "Love Come Down" was released in July 1982 by RCA Records as the lead single from Get Loose. In the United States, it reached number one on the Billboard Black Singles and Hot Dance/Disco charts and number 17 on the Billboard Hot 100. It also cracked the top 20 on the charts in several other countries, including number seven in the United Kingdom.

A reggae version of the song by Jamaican singer Barry Biggs hit the top-five in the Netherlands in 1983. The song was a UK Top 40 hit in 1994 when covered by British singer Alison Limerick. In 2013, The Saturdays released a cover of the song as a B-side to single "Disco Love". In 2014, Liam Keegan released a version of "Love Come Down" featuring vocalist Julia Schlippert. Jess Glynne also performed a cover of the song on the 2015–16 edition of Jools' Annual Hootenanny.

== Critical reception ==
"Love Come Down" was widely praised upon its release and in later years. Brian Chin of Billboard magazine praised "Love Come Down" for a "strong Kashif hook, and a cutting King vocal performance". Cash Box was also complimentary: "Ultra-smooth, sleek keyboard textures combine with a bobbing bass and handclap rhythm for maximum danceability..."

Justin M. Kantor of All Music Guide praised the song composition in a 2003 review, for "romantic lyrics and celestial keyboard layerings against a steady funk beat". For BBC Music, Daryl Easlea called the song "simply life-affirming, upbeat and zestful; a great record from an era when there was strong competition on the dancefloor." Ivy Nelson of Pitchfork Media regarded the song "potentially the defining statement of post-disco R&B".

In 2014, Bruce Pollock ranked "Love Come Down" among the most important songs from 1944 to 2000.

== Track listing and formats ==
American 7-inch vinyl single (PB-13273)

A-side
No.	Title	Length
1.	"Love Come Down" (Vocal)	3:43

B-side
No.	Title	Length
1.	"Love Come Down" (Instrumental)	3:43

American 12-inch vinyl single (PD-13274)

A-side
No.	Title	Length
1.	"Love Come Down" (Vocal)	5:56

B-side
No.	Title	Length
1.	"Love Come Down" (Instrumental)	5:56

== Credits and personnel ==
- Backing vocals – Evelyn King, Kashif, Marie Council
- Guitar – Ira Siegel
- Drums – Leslie Ming
- OB-X handclaps – Kashif, Steve Goldman
- Percussion instrument – Bashiri Johnson
- Acoustic piano, electric piano (Fender Rhodes), keyboards, analog synthesizer (Oberheim OB-X), analog bass synthesizer (Minimoog) – Kashif
- Lyrics and music – Kashif
- Producer – Morrie Brown, Kashif (assoc.), Paul Lawrence Jones III (assoc.)
- Recording studio – Kashif's Celestial Sounds, The Power Station

Post-production

- Audio mastering – Frankford/Wayne Mastering Labs
- Audio mixing – Sigma Sound Studios, New York

== Charts ==
Chart (1982)	Peak position
Canada Top Singles (RPM)	44
France (IFOP)	19
Ireland (IRMA)	13
Japan (Japanese Singles Chart)	10
New Zealand (Recorded Music NZ)	12
UK Singles (Official Charts)	7
US Billboard Hot 100	17
US Hot R&B/Hip-Hop Songs (Billboard)	1
US Dance Club Songs (Billboard)	1

== Sampling ==
The song has been sampled many times, including the following:

- "Love Come Down" by Liam Keegan feat. Julia Schlippert (2014)
- "High Come Down" by Chico & Coolwadda (2001) features an interpolation King's recording.
- "World Go Round" by Mo Twister (2000).
- ”Drop Your Love” by Ciara (2025).

== Alison Limerick version ==
"Love Come Down"

Single by Alison Limerick

from the album With a Twist
- Released: 1994
- Studio: Sarm West Studios, London
- Genre: House
- Label: Arista; BMG
- Songwriter: Kashif
- Producer: The Beloved

Alison Limerick singles chronology
"Time of Our Lives" (1994)	"Love Come Down" (1994)	"Where Love Lives '96" (1996)

Music video
- "Love Come Down" on YouTube

In 1994, British singer-songwriter Alison Limerick released a cover version of "Love Come Down". It was released in February 1994 by Arista and BMG as the second single from her second album, With a Twist (1994). The song was produced by British band The Beloved and peaked at number 36 on the UK Singles Chart as well as number eight on the UK Club Chart.

=== Critical reception ===
Larry Flick from Billboard magazine stated that Limerick "is in excellent voice" on the song. Andy Beevers from Music Week gave it a score of four out of five, saying, "This well executed but predictable cover of the Evelyn King track has been produced by Jon and Helena Marsh of The Beloved. A possible Top 40 hit." James Hamilton from the Record Mirror Dance Update wrote in his weekly dance column, "The Beloved's Evelyn King remake twinpack promoed in beefily striding 124.1bpm Fierce Child, Robin S-ish 124bpm Club, 124.1bpm Deep, fluttering dubby 124bpm Waydown, stuttering trancey 124bpm Deepdown, droning then building jiggly 120.3bpm Paul Gotel Banged Up, good percussively cantering 125bpm PG Tips Outrageous Dub Mixes."

=== Track listing ===
- 12-inch vinyl, UK (1994)

A1. "Love Come Down" (Club Vocal Mix) — 8:37
A2. "Love Come Down" (Deepdown Mix) — 6:00
B1. "Love Come Down" (Banged Up Mix) — 8:52
B2. "Love Come Down" (PG Tips Anthem Mix) — 7:36

- CD single, UK & France (1994)
1. "Love Come Down" (7" Radio Edit) — 4:12
2. "Love Come Down" (Club Vocal Mix) — 8:38
3. "Love Come Down" (Banged Up Mix) — 8:51
4. "Love Come Down" (Fierce Child Mix) — 6:24
5. "Love Come Down" (PG Tips Anthem Mix) — 7:35

=== Charts ===
Chart (1994)	Peak position
Europe (Eurochart Hot 100)	95
UK Singles (OCC)	36
UK Dance (Music Week)	7
UK Club Chart (Music Week)	8

== See also ==
- List of number-one dance singles of 1982 (U.S.)
- List of number-one R&B singles of 1982 (U.S.)
