= Shame (Evelyn "Champagne" King song) =

1977 single by Evelyn "Champagne" King

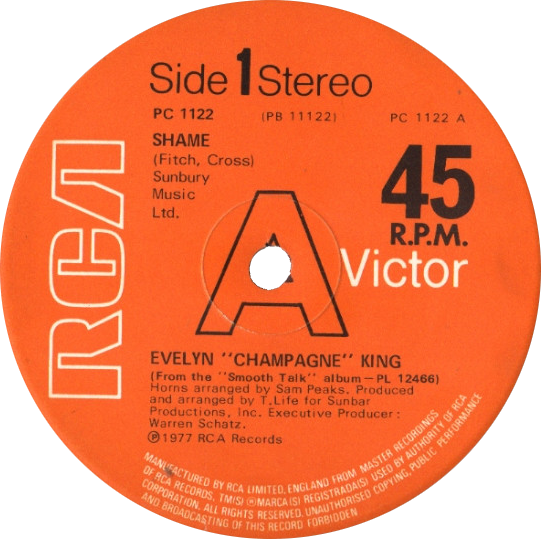
- Side A of UK 12-inch single

Single by Evelyn "Champagne" King

from the album Smooth Talk
- B-side: "Dancin', Dancin', Dancin'" (7" and some 12" releases); "Nobody Knows" (many 12" releases)
- Released: September 20, 1977
- Genre: Disco; R&B
- Length: 2:59 (single version); 4:38 (album version); 6:34 (12" version)
- Label: RCA; Big Break Records
- Songwriters: John H. Fitch Jr.; Reuben Cross
- Producer: Theodore Life

Evelyn "Champagne" King singles chronology
| "Shame" (1977) | "I Don't Know If It's Right" (1978) |

Audio
- "Shame" (album version) on YouTube

Alternative release
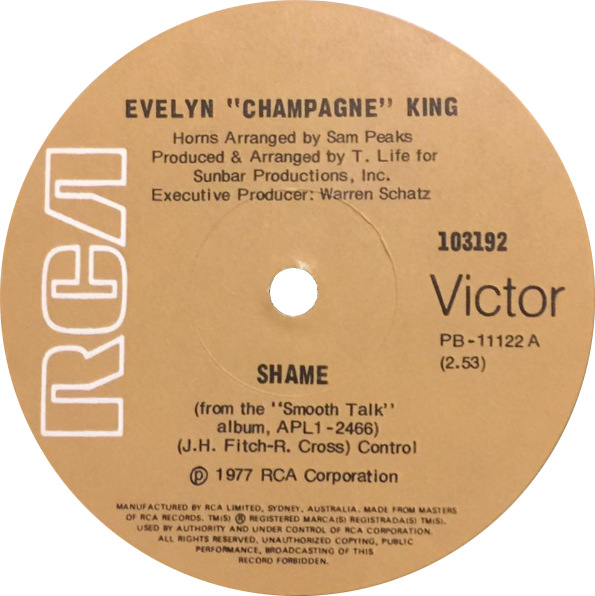
- Side A of Australian 7-inch single

"Shame" is the debut single by American R&B singer Evelyn "Champagne" King, written by John H. Fitch Jr. and Reuben Cross. It was released in September 1977 by RCA Records as part of King's debut studio album, Smooth Talk (1977). The extended remix was produced for the twelve-inch vinyl single and would later replace the album version of the song in late-1970s reprints of the album. "Shame" was successful on the US Billboard music charts and would become one of King's signature songs, though it varied on international music charts. The song was covered by Zhané for the 1994 film A Low Down Dirty Shame and Kim Wilde in 1996.

== Recordings ==
The song "Shame" was released as part of King's 1977 album Smooth Talk and lasts four minutes and thirty-eight seconds. The album version opens with a saxophone note by Sam Peake and is "more concise." Scotty Miller played the drums, and Instant Funk member Raymond Earl played the bass. Al Garrison and David Todd produced the extended remix for the twelve-inch vinyl single, which lasts around six minutes and thirty-five seconds, two minutes longer than the album version, and would replace the album version of the song in late-1970s vinyl re-releases of the album. The extended remix rearranges the drum notes to "[emphasize] the beat more" and widened the drum and bass sounds. The song was remixed twice: once by Enzo Bertoni as "Shame '92", and once by producer Tommy Faragher as "Shame '95 (Tommy Faragher Remix)" for King's 1995 album, I'll Keep a Light On.

== Chart performance ==
The twelve-inch remix vinyl release reached number eight on the US Billboard Disco Action chart in January 1978. This release also stayed at number five, its peak position, on Canada's RPM Dance/Urban chart for two weeks until the week ending April 29, 1978.

The song entered the Billboard Hot 100 at number eighty-seven on the week ending June 17, 1978; it peaked at number nine on the week ending September 9 that year. It also reached number seven on the Hot Soul Singles chart on the week ending July 1. The song earned a gold certification by the RIAA on August 11, 1978. On the Billboard Year-End charts of 1978, the song positioned at number sixty-four on the Year-End Hot 100, number twenty-seven on the Year-End Disco singles chart, and number twenty-six on the Year-End Soul Singles chart. It also peaked at number eight on the Cash Box Top 100.

It entered Canada's RPM Top 100 Singles chart at number one hundred on the week ending June 24 the same year and stayed at number sixteen, its peak position, for two weeks in September 1978. It positioned at number 111 on the RPM Year-end Top 200 Singles chart.

On the UK singles chart, the song spent twenty-three weeks on the chart but only one week in the top 40, peaking at number thirty-nine. In the Netherlands, it peaked at number eighteen for two weeks on the Dutch Top 40 chart and number twenty-six on the Single Top 100. It reached number twelve on the Belgian Ultratop Top 50 Singles chart.

== Legacy ==
King's version is featured in the 2002 video game Grand Theft Auto: Vice City on the in-game radio station Fever 105 and also as part of the soundtrack Grand Theft Auto: Vice City, Vol. 6: Fever 105.

To this date, "Shame" remains one of King's signature songs.

== Track listings ==
7" vinyl single

1. "Shame" – 2:53 or 2:55
2. "Dancin', Dancin', Dancin'" – 2:51

12" vinyl single (A)

1. "Shame" – 6:35
2. "Nobody Knows" – 4:31

12" vinyl single (B)

1. "Shame" – 6:35
2. "Dancin', Dancin', Dancin'" – 4:12

== Credits and personnel ==
- Evelyn "Champagne" King – vocals
- Sam Peake – saxophone
- Theodore Life – producer, arrangement
- Warren Schatz – executive producer
- Scotty Miller – drums
- Raymond Earl – bass
- Al Garrison and David Todd – producers (12" remix only)

== Charts and certifications ==
=== Weekly charts ===
| Chart (1978) | Peak position |
|---|---|
| Australia (Kent Music Report) | 72 |
| Belgium (Ultratop Top 50 Singles Wallonia) | 12 |
| Canada Top 100 Singles (RPM) | 16 |
| Canada Dance/Urban (RPM) | 5 |
| Netherlands (Dutch Top 40) | 18 |
| Netherlands (Single Top 100) | 26 |
| UK Singles (OCC) | 39 |
| US Billboard Hot 100 | 9 |
| US Disco Action (Billboard) | 8 |
| US Hot Soul Singles (Billboard) | 7 |
| US Cash Box Top 100 | 8 |

| Chart (1992) | Peak position |
|---|---|
| UK Singles (OCC) | 74 |
| UK Dance (Music Week) | 26 |
| UK Club Chart (Music Week) | 13 |

=== Year-end charts ===
| Chart (1978) | Position |
|---|---|
| Canada Top 200 Singles (RPM) | 111 |
| US Billboard Hot 100 | 64 |
| US Disco Audience Response (Billboard) | 27 |
| US Soul Singles (Billboard) | 26 |

=== Certifications ===
| Region | Certification | Certified units/sales |
|---|---|---|
| Canada (Music Canada) | Gold | 75,000^{^} |
| United States (RIAA) | Gold | 1,000,000^{^} |
^{^} Shipments figures based on certification alone.

== Zhané version ==
"Shame"

Single by Zhané

from the album A Low Down Dirty Shame Soundtrack
- Released: November 7, 1994
- Genre: R&B; new jack swing; house
- Length: 4:14
- Label: Jive; Hollywood Records
- Songwriters: John H. Fitch Jr.; Reuben Cross
- Producers: Mike Chapman; Trent Thomas

Zhané singles chronology
| "Vibe" (1994) | "Shame" (1994) | "You're Sorry Now" (1995) |

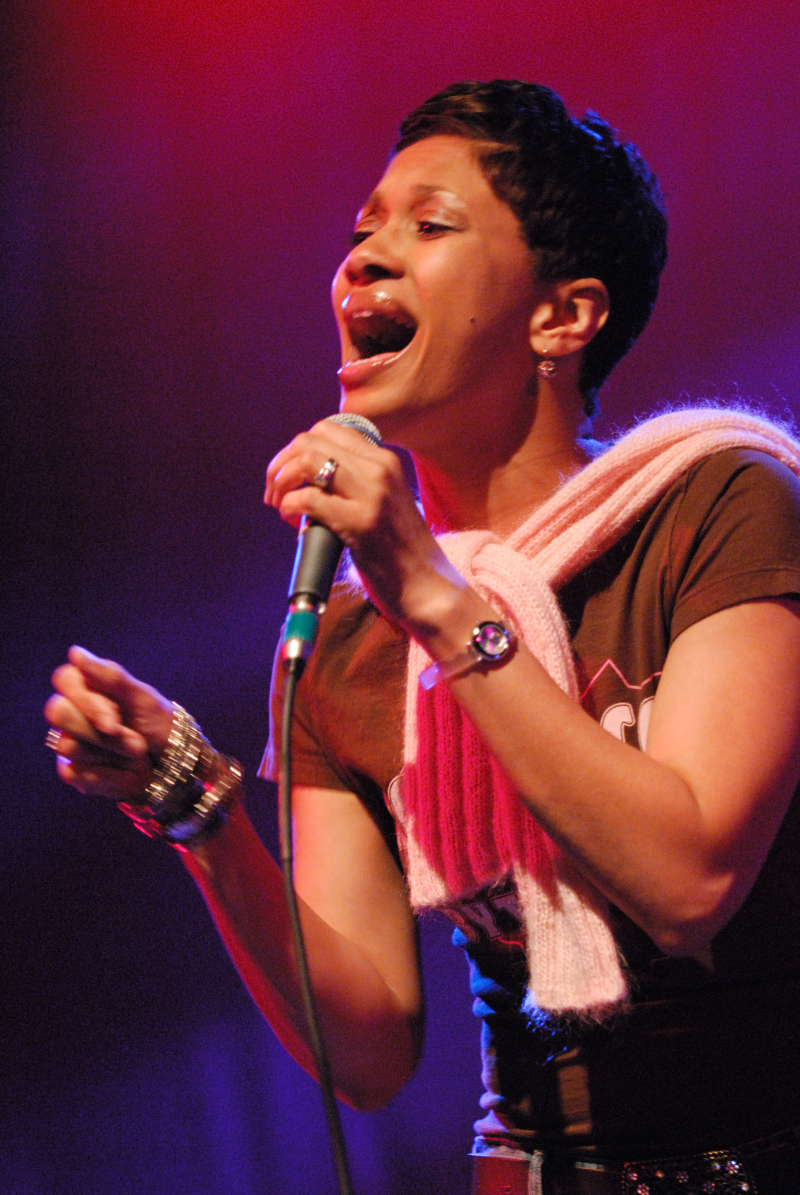
Jean Baylor (2007)

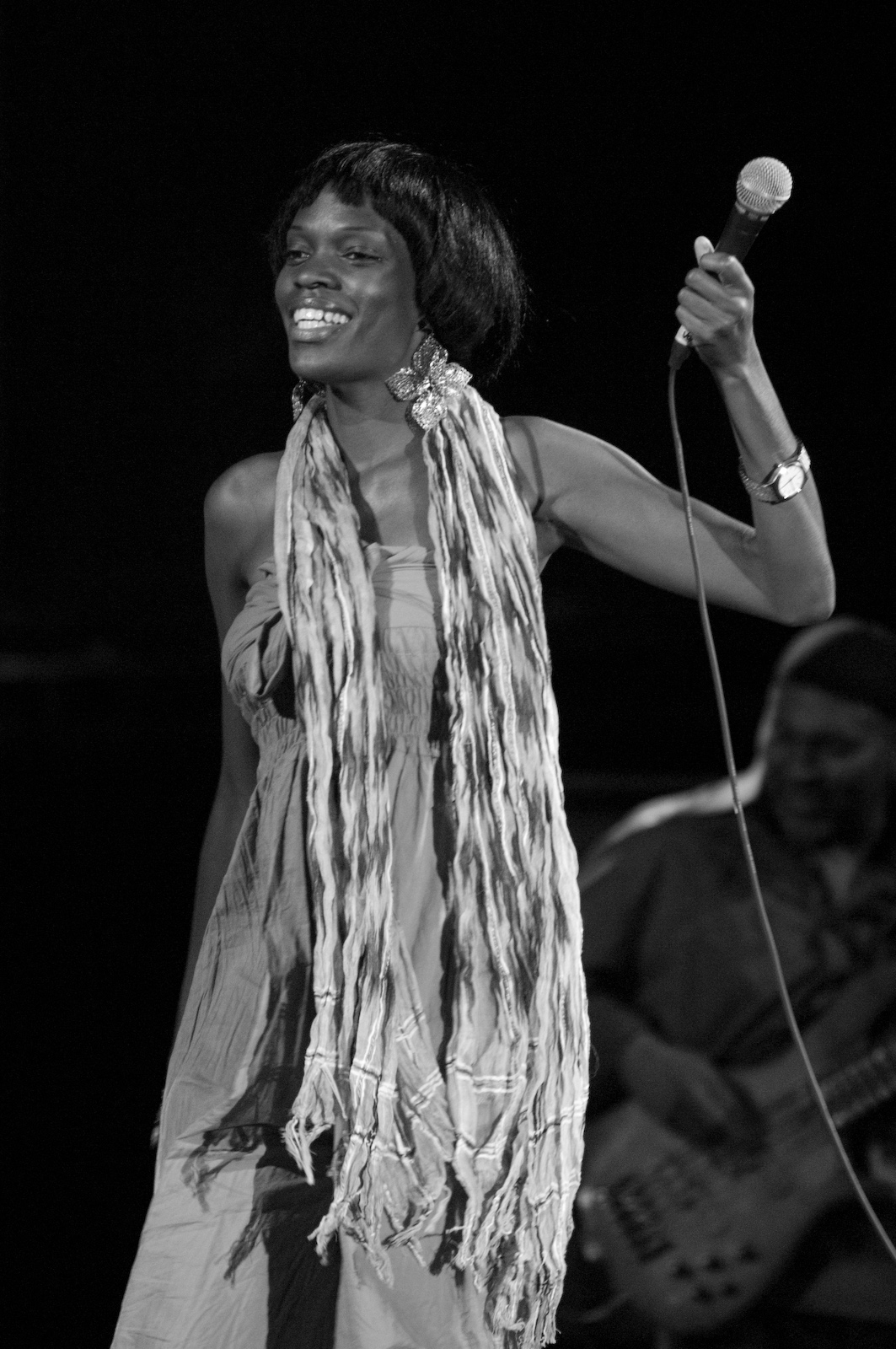
Renee Neufville (2009)

The duo Zhané covered the song for the 1994 film A Low Down Dirty Shame

In 1994, R&B/hip-hop soul duo Zhané covered the song, produced by Mike Chapman and Trent Thomas, and released by Jive Records and Hollywood Records as part of the soundtrack for the 1994 film A Low Down Dirty Shame, starring Keenen Ivory Wayans. In the US Billboard charts, the rendition reached number twenty-eight on the Hot 100, number thirty-one on the Hot 100 Airplay, number thirty-eight on the Mainstream Top 40, number forty-six on the Hot Dance Club Songs, number thirteen on the Hot R&B/Hip-Hop Airplay, and number nine on the Top 40/Rhythm-Crossover.

This version reached number sixty-six on the UK Singles Chart. It was charted for one week in February 1995 on the New Zealand Singles Chart, peaking at number fifty. The music video of the Zhané version shows the duo performing the song and scenes from the film.

=== Critical reception ===
Critic David Browne in an Entertainment Weekly article praised this version as one of the film soundtrack's "moments"; he graded the soundtrack a "B−". Pan-European magazine Music & Media wrote, "For the theme song to the film by the same name, the new jill swing duo does something its peers hardly do anymore: bumping to an upbeat track instead of snoozing to another sugary ballad." Ralph Tee from the Record Mirror Dance Update gave it a score of four out of five and named it "a rather excellent rendition". He added, "In its original form, the track chugs along very nicely with a somewhat Kool & The Gang post-'Ladies Night' feel, a classic Deodato production style fusing perfectly with modern sounds produced by Mike Chapman."

=== Music video ===
The music video for "Shame" was directed by Ernie Fritz and filmed in New York. Mike Alfieri produced the clip for Automatic Productions and Michael Negrin directed photography.

=== Track listings ===
- US CD single
1. "Shame" (LP Version) – 4:14
2. "Shame" (The Bump Mix, featuring Whitey Don) – 4:31
3. "Shame" (Club Version) – 6:41
4. "Shame" (The Bump Club Version, featuring Whitey Don) – 4:36
5. "Shame" (Club Dub) – 6:00
6. Zhané Flavor – 5:01
  1. "Interlude"
  2. "You're Sorry Now"
  3. "La La La"
  4. "Love Me Today"
  5. "Changes"
  6. "Off My Mind/Outro"
- US 12" vinyl single

Side A

1. "Shame" (LP Version) – 4:14
2. "Shame" (The Bump Mix, featuring Whitey Don) – 4:31
3. "Shame" (The Bump Club Version, featuring Whitey Don) – 4:36

Side B

1. "Shame" (Club Version) – 6:41
2. "Shame" (Club Dub) – 6:00
- European CD single
1. "Shame" (LP Version) – 4:14
2. "Shame" (The Bump Radio Mix, featuring Whitey Don) – 4:31
3. "Shame" (Club Version) – 6:41
4. "Shame" (The Bump Club Version, featuring Whitey Don) – 4:36
5. "Shame" (Bump Radio) – 4:11
6. "Shame" (UK Flavour Extended) – 5:06
- UK CD single
1. "Shame" (LP Version) – 4:14
2. "Shame" (The Bump Radio Mix, featuring Whitey Don) – 4:11
3. "Shame" (UK Flavour) – 4:37
4. "Shame" (Club Version) – 6:41
5. "Shame" (UK Flavour Extended) – 5:06
6. "Shame" (The Bump Club Version, featuring Whitey Don) – 4:36
- UK 12" vinyl single

Side A

1. "Shame" (LP Version) – 4:13
2. "Shame" (The Bump Mix, featuring Whitey Don) – 4:36
3. "Shame" (Club Version) – 6:41

Side B

1. "Shame" (UK Flavour Extended) – 5:06
2. "Shame" (UK Flavour Instrumental) – 4:37
- UK cassette single
1. "Shame" (LP Version) – 4:13
2. "Shame" (UK Flavour) – 4:37

=== Charts ===
| Chart (1994–95) | Peak position |
|---|---|
| Australia (ARIA) | 133 |
| Europe (European Dance Radio) | 11 |
| New Zealand (RIANZ) | 50 |
| UK Singles (OCC) | 66 |
| UK Club Chart (Music Week) | 45 |
| US Billboard Hot 100 | 28 |
| US Hot Dance Club Songs (Billboard) | 46 |
| US Hot R&B/Hip-Hop Airplay (Billboard) | 13 |
| US Mainstream Top 40 (Billboard) | 38 |
| US Maxi-Singles Sales (Billboard) | 6 |
| US Top 40/Rhythm-Crossover (Billboard) | 9 |
| US Cash Box Top 100 | 26 |

== Kim Wilde version ==
"Shame"

Single by Kim Wilde

from the album The Singles Collection
- Released: 30 September 1996
- Genre: Pop
- Length: 3:38 (album version); 3:21 (Jupiter's radio mix)
- Label: MCA
- Songwriters: John H. Fitch Jr.; Reuben Cross
- Producer: Ricki Wilde

Kim Wilde singles chronology
| "This I Swear" (1996) | "Shame" (1996) | "Loved" (2001) |

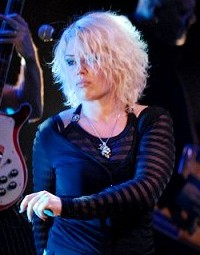
Kim Wilde (pictured in 2007) covered the song in 1996

The song was covered in 1996 by British singer Kim Wilde. She originally recorded the song as a "new" track on the compilation album The Singles Collection, which was released only in France (not to be confused with the internationally released compilation The Singles Collection 1981–1993 three years prior to this). Wilde's version was released as a single in France and was remixed and released in the United Kingdom. Several extended remixes were also made available in the UK on the 12" and CD-single formats.

The version was charted for one week on the UK Singles Chart, peaking at No. 79.

=== Critical reception ===
British magazine Music Week rated Wilde's cover of "Shame" three out of five, adding, "Due out the day after Wilde weds Tommy co-star Hal Fowler, this is a fine but unspectacular updating of the Seventies disco classic."

=== Music video ===
The accompanying music video of "Shame" shows Wilde performing the song in various scenes, including those with four male dancers.

=== Track listings ===
- UK CD single
1. "Shame" (Jupiter's Radio Mix) – 3:18
2. "Shame" (Matt Darey's Vocal Mix) – 7:12
3. "Shame" (T-Empo's Club Mix) – 9:01
4. "Hypnotise" (album version) – 4:49
- UK 12-inch vinyl single

Side one

1. "Shame" (Jupiter's 12" Mix) – 7:11
2. "Shame" (Matt Darey's Vocal Mix) – 7:12
3. "Shame" (T-Empo's Club Mix) – 9:01

Side two

1. "Shame" (T-Empo's Dub Mix) – 7:09
2. "Shame" (Matt Darey Dub) – 6:43
- UK cassette single (same tracklist in both sides)
1. "Shame" (Jupiter's Radio Mix) – 3:18
2. "Hypnotise" (album version) – 4:49
- France CD single (A)
1. "Shame" (Jupiter's Radio Mix) – 3:18
2. "Shame" (original radio edit) – 3:37
- France CD single (B)
1. "Shame" – 3:37
2. "If I Can't Have You"

=== Charts ===
==== Weekly charts ====
| Chart (1996) | Peak position |
|---|---|
| UK Singles (OCC) | 79 |
| UK Pop Tip Club Chart (Music Week) | 1 |

==== Year-end charts ====
| Chart (1996) | Position |
|---|---|
| UK Pop Tip Club Chart (Music Week) | 34 |
