= The Wood (soundtrack) =

Music From and Inspired by the Motion Picture The Wood

Soundtrack album by Various artists
- Released: July 13, 1999
- Genres: Hip hop; R&B
- Length: 1:19:08
- Label: Jive Records
- Producers: Night & Day; Timmy Allen; Earthtone III; Jay Mac; Joe; Kendal; Larry Campbell; Larry Smith; Luther Vandross; Mannie Fresh; Marley Marl; Organized Noize; Scott Storch; Shim; Suga Bear; Swizz Beatz; Teddy Riley; The Roots; Trackmasters; Vada Nobles

Singles from The Wood
- 1. "Neck uv da Woods" Released: July 13, 1999; 2. "Crave" Released: July 13, 1999; 3. "Think About You" Released: July 31, 1999; 4. "I Wanna Know" Released: November 7, 1999

Professional ratings
Review scores
| Source | Rating |
|---|---|
| AllMusic | 3/5 stars |

Music from and Inspired by the Motion Picture The Wood is the soundtrack Rick Famuyiwa's 1999 film The Wood. It was released on July 13, 1999 through Jive Records and consisted of hip hop and R&B music. The album peaked at number 16 on the Billboard 200, number 2 on the Top R&B/Hip-Hop Albums, and went Gold by the Recording Industry Association of America on August 25, 1999.

It spawned four charting singles with music videos to promote the film: "Neck uv da Woods" by Mystikal and Outkast (directed by Little X), "Crave" by Marc Dorsey (directed by Tim Story), "Think About You" by Blackstreet (directed by Malik Sayeed) and "I Wanna Know" by Joe (directed by Bille Woodruff).

== Track listing ==
| No. | Title | Writer(s) | Producer(s) | Length |
|---|---|---|---|---|
| 1. | "Neck Uv Da Woods" (performed by Mystikal and OutKast) | M. Tyler; A. Benjamin; A. Patton | Earthtone III | 4:06 |
| 2. | "Think About You" (performed by Blackstreet) | T. Riley; S. Blair | Teddy Riley | 4:36 |
| 3. | "Ya' All Know Who!" (performed by The Roots) | T. Trotter; S. Storch; A. Thompson; K. Gray | The Roots; Scott Storch | 3:41 |
| 4. | "I Can, I Can" (performed by DMX) | E. Simmons; K. Dean | Swizz Beatz | 2:40 |
| 5. | "The Hood (It's All Good)" (performed by Cash Money Millionaires) | B. Williams; C. Dorsey; T. Gray; D. Carter; B. Thomas; T. Virgil Jr. | Mannie Fresh | 4:03 |
| 6. | "Belts to Match" (performed by UGK, Smitty and Sonji) | C. Butler; B. Freeman; B. Smith; P. Brown | Organized Noize | 4:22 |
| 7. | "It's All Good" (performed by R. Kelly) | R. Kelly; J. Oliver; S. Barnes; G. Jackson | Trackmasters | 3:34 |
| 8. | "I Wanna Know" (performed by Joe) | J. Thomas; J. Skinner; M. Williams | Joe; Timmy Allen | 4:57 |
| 9. | "Crave" (performed by Marc Dorsey) | T. Allen; J. Skinner; L. Campbell; M. Dorsey | Timmy Allen; Larry "Rock" Campbell | 4:57 |
| 10. | "24-7 (Lil' Jon Dirty South Mix)" (performed by Liberty City) | R. Pugh; V. Nobles; T. Newton | Vada Nobles Remixer: Lil Jon | 4:25 |
| 11. | "Jane's Law" (performed by Jane Blaze) | N. Knight-Williams; C. Charles; C. Jackson | Suga Bear; Shim | 4:42 |
| 12. | "Still Strugglin'" (performed by Too $hort) | T. Shaw; J. Beard | Jay Mac | 5:22 |
| 13. | "Dante's Girl" (performed by Night & Day) | G. Hughes; T. Martinez | Night & Day | 4:35 |
| 14. | "Love Letter" (performed by Imajin) | G. Hughes; T. Martinez; J. Skinner | Night & Day | 4:58 |
| 15. | "Freaks Come out at Night" (performed by Whodini) | J. Hutchins; L. Smith | Larry Smith | 4:24 |
| 16. | "Make the Music With Your Mouth, Biz" (performed by Biz Markie) | M. Hall; M. Williams | Marley Marl | 4:06 |
| 17. | "Back in the Day (Remix)" (performed by Ahmad) | A. Lewis; S. Gordy; C. Womack; G. Noble; L. Womack | Kendal | 4:44 |
| 18. | "If This World Were Mine" (performed by Luther Vandross and Cheryl Lynn) | M. Gaye | Luther Vandross | 4:56 |
| Total length: | | | | 1:17:18 |

Sample credits

- Track 7 contains a sample of "Spoonin' Rap" by Spoonie Gee
- Track 17 contains a sample of "Love T.K.O." by Teddy Pendergrass

Notes

- Tracks 3–7, 11-14 are not contained in the film.

== Charts ==
=== Weekly charts ===
| Chart (1999) | Peak position |
|---|---|
| US Billboard 200 | 16 |
| US Top R&B/Hip-Hop Albums (Billboard) | 2 |

=== Year-end charts ===
| Chart (1999) | Position |
|---|---|
| US Top R&B/Hip-Hop Albums (Billboard) | 88 |

== Certifications ==
| Region | Certification | Certified units/sales |
|---|---|---|
| United States (RIAA) | Gold | 500,000^{^} |
^{^} Shipments figures based on certification alone.
