= Ill-Gotten Gaines =

Ill-Gotten Gaines may refer to:

- "Ill-Gotten Gaines" (1990), an episode of Cop Rock
- "Ill-Gotten Gaines" (1992), an episode of Cheers

== See also ==
- Ill Gotten Gains, a 1997 film
- Ill Gotten Gains, a 2016 miniseries presented by Rav Wilding
