= De'Aundre Bonds =

American actor (born 1976)

- Born: March 19, 1976 (age 50); Los Angeles, California
- Occupation: Actor
- Years active: 1993–2001, 2011–present
- Height: 5 ft 8 in (173 cm)

De'aundre Bonds (born March 19, 1976) is an American actor known for his roles in 1990s cult classics like Tales from the Hood (1995) and The Wood (1999), as well as his role as Skully on FX's Snowfall.

== Career ==
Bonds has mostly appeared as a guest actor on television shows; however, he was also featured in the Spike Lee film Get on the Bus, in Tales from the Hood and in the Rick Famuyiwa film The Wood. Between 2019–2023 he had a recurring role on the television series Snowfall as Scully. He has a production company called Take Off Productions with fellow actor Francis Capra.

== Personal life ==
Bonds was born in Los Angeles, California. In 1998 he was convicted of manslaughter in the death of his aunt's boyfriend. In 2011, he finished serving a 10-year sentence at California Rehabilitation Center Norco, California.

== Filmography ==
=== Film ===
Year	Title	Role	Notes
1995	Tales from the Hood	Ball	
1996	Sunset Park	Busy-Bee	
1996	Get on the Bus	Junior, aka 'Smooth'	
1997	Ill Gotten Gains	Pop	
1997	Kaos on Warrick Ave.	De Carlos	Short
1999	The Wood	Stacey	
2000	3 Strikes	J.J.	
2000	The Heist	Trent	Video
2000	Lockdown	Dre	
2001	Flossin	Bud	
2003	Black Ball	Sweet	
2013	Gangster Squad	Duke Del-Red	
2014	Imperial Dreams	Gideon	
2014	Behind De Pole	Trey King	
2015	Dope	Stacey	
2015	The Ghetto	Moose	
2016	Bank	CK	
2017	The Fighters Prayer	Holyfield	
2018	Good Cop Bad Cop	Detective	
2021	Trip Slip	Red's Homeboy	
2021	Blood Sacrifice	Gunz	
2021	Power & Money	Peanut	
2022	Father Stu	Gerald	
2022	A True Christmas	TJ	
2023	Sisters	E	
2023	Packz	Banger #1	
2025	The Kind Hand	Pete Ramirez	
2025	Angie's Cure	Tre	
2025	Return of the Mack	T-Tony	
2025	Kingpins	Biggs Sr.	
2025	Beneath the Code	Pete	
2025	First Christmas Home	Eric	
2026	LA Undercover: Against the Code	Smoke	

=== Television ===
Year	Title	Role	Notes
1993	South of Sunset	Boy #1	Episode: "Newspaper Boy"
1994	Picket Fences	Teenager #1	Episode: "Enemy Lines"
1995	Chicago Hope	Gary Polter	Episode: "Leave of Absence"
1996	The Burning Zone	Basketball Player	Episode: "Arms of Fire"
1996	Touched by an Angel	Luther Dixon	Episode: "Sins of the Father"
1996	Diagnosis: Murder	Darnell Sant	Episode: "The ABC's of Murder"
1996	High Incident	Derrick	Episode: "Warrant Peace" & "Christmas Blues"
1997	413 Hope St.	Slim	Episode: "Redemption"
1997	NYPD Blue	Gerard	Episode: "It Takes a Village"
1998	The Parent 'Hood	Stone	Episode: "'Hood Sweet' Hood: Part 1"
1999	The Steve Harvey Show	Mo-Mo	Episode: "Nightmare on Steve's Street"
2001	NYPD Blue	Mitchell Dunn	Episode: "Franco, My Dear, I Don't Give a Damn"
2011	Rizzoli & Isles	Guy	Episode: "Can I Get a Witness?"
2019–23	Snowfall	Terrence "Skully" Brown	Recurring Cast: Season 3–6
