= I Wanna Know (Joe song) =

1999 single by Joe

Single by Joe

from the album The Wood: Music from the Motion Picture and My Name Is Joe
- Released: November 7, 1999
- Genre: R&B
- Length: 4:56 (album version); 4:41 (radio edit)
- Label: Jive
- Songwriters: Joseph Thomas; Joylon Skinner; Michele Williams
- Producers: Joseph Thomas; Edwin "Tony" Nicholas; Timmy Allen

Joe singles chronology
"Thank God I Found You" (1999)	"I Wanna Know" (1999)	"Treat Her Like a Lady" (2000)

Music video
- "I Wanna Know" on YouTube

"I Wanna Know" is a song by American R&B singer Joe. It was written by Joe, Joylon Skinner and Michele Williams for his third studio album My Name Is Joe, which was released on April 18, 2000, while production was helmed by Joe and Tony Nicholas, featuring additional credit from Timmy Allen. It also appeared on the soundtrack to the film The Wood (1999). Released as the lead single on November 7, 1999, it reached number four on the US Billboard Hot 100 and number two on the Hot R&B/Hip-Hop Singles & Tracks chart. The song was ranked fourth on the Billboard Hot 100's 2000 year-end chart.

== Background ==
According to the song's co-producer Edwin "Tony" Nicholas, "I Wanna Know" was originally intended for Joe's previous 1997 album All That I Am. He removed the song from the final track listing due to taking issue with the Jive Records label heads wanting to be involved in the creative process. A few years later, he was asked to contribute a song to the soundtrack of the 1999 film The Wood and claimed he didn't have anything to send to the record label. He then sent in "I Wanna Know" because it happened to be lying around the studio. The song was then included on the 2000 album My Name is Joe and released as a single.

A special remix of the song, entitled "The Roni Remix", can be found on a special U.K. edition of the 2001 album Better Days as a bonus track. The remix retains most of the original version's lyrics but features a different instrumental from its original as well as additional lyrics. Another remix entitled "Phat Butt Remix" by Beau "DJ BO" van Gils is made in the 2Bro'z Boomroll Studios in Roermond, The Netherlands, additional raps are also done by DJ BO. This remix is released on vinyl 12 inch and as bonustrack on the album.

== Music video ==
The music video (directed by Bille Woodruff) starts out with a woman (played by Claudia Jordan) having an argument with her boyfriend in an alley off the street. Joe and two of his friends see the ongoing argument and after the woman's boyfriend leaves he approaches her and talks to her, in the process of obtaining her phone number. The rest of the music video shows Joe and the woman spending time with each other as their relationship becomes stronger. The woman is assumed to have cut off her relationship with her boyfriend from the beginning of the music video.

== Track listings ==
CD single
No.	Title	Length
1.	"I Wanna Know" (radio edit)	4:41
2.	"I Wanna Know" (The Roni remix)	4:37
3.	"Get Crunk Tonight"	4:17

CD maxi single
No.	Title	Length
1.	"I Wanna Know"	4:57
2.	"I Wanna Know" (instrumental)	5:05
3.	"U Shoulda Told Me (U Had a Man)"	3:44
4.	"U Shoulda Told Me (U Had a Man)" (instrumental)	3:48

== Charts ==
=== Weekly charts ===
2000–2001 weekly chart performance
Chart (2000–2001)	Peak position
Australia (ARIA)	34
Canada Top Singles (RPM)	6
Canada Adult Contemporary (RPM)	22
France (SNEP)	61
Netherlands (Dutch Top 40)	17
Netherlands (Single Top 100)	17
Scottish Singles Sales (Official Charts)	95
UK Singles (Official Charts)	37
UK Indie (Official Charts)	4
UK Hip Hop/R&B (Official Charts)	8
US Billboard Hot 100	4
US Adult Contemporary (Billboard)	21
US Hot R&B/Hip-Hop Songs (Billboard)	2
US Pop Airplay (Billboard)	5
US Rhythmic Airplay (Billboard)	3

2026 weekly chart performance
Chart (2026)	Peak position
Jamaica Airplay (JAMMS)	10

=== Year-end charts ===
Chart (2000)	Position
Netherlands (Single Top 100)	88
US Billboard Hot 100	4
US Adult Contemporary (Billboard)	42
US Hot R&B/Hip-Hop Singles & Tracks (Billboard)	2
US Hot Soundtrack Singles (Billboard)	1
US Mainstream Top 40 (Billboard)	18
US Rhythmic Top 40 (Billboard)	1

=== Decade-end charts ===
Chart (2000–2009)	Position
US Billboard Hot 100	75

== Release history ==
Region	Date	Format(s)	Label(s)	Ref.
United States	November 7, 1999	—N/a	Jive	
United States	May 1, 2000	Contemporary hit radio	Jive	
United States	June 12, 2000	Adult contemporary radio	Jive	
United Kingdom	April 23, 2001	12-inch vinyl; CD; cassette	Jive	
