= David "Shark" Fralick =

American actor

David Fralick
- Born: October 16, 1962 (age 64); Coral Gables, Florida, U.S.
- Occupation: Actor
- Years active: 1990–present
- Website: larrywarton.com

David "Shark" Fralick (/ˈfreɪlɪk/ FRAY-lik; born October 16, 1962) is an American actor who portrayed the recurring character of Larry Warton on The Young and the Restless from 1995 to 1996 and again from 1999 to 2005. He played the title character in the 1996 horror film Uncle Sam. He performed as 'Graffiti' in the 2000 film Lockdown. He starred alongside Jean-Claude Van Damme in Inferno (1999).

Fralick was born in Coral Gables, Florida. He is of German, Italian and Jewish descent.

== Filmography ==
Year	Title	Role	Other notes
1990	Soultaker	Brad Deville	
1991	Project Eliminator	'Shark'	
1994	Future Shock	Male Dancer	
1995	Fist of the North Star	Man At Palace, Former North Star Martial Artist	
1996	Night Hunter	Ulmer	
1996	The Last Days of Frankie the Fly	Porn Actor	
1997	Uncle Sam	Master Sergeant Sam Harper	
1997	Laws of Deception	Thug #4	
1998	Best of the Best 4: Without Warning	Oleg	
1999	Inferno	Matt Hogan	
1999	Chill Factor	Blonde Biker	
1999	Dirt Merchant	Sergeant Sampson	
1999	Blink of an Eye	Tommy's Father	
2000	Lockdown	'Graffiti'	
2001	Final Payback	Officer Smith	
2002	Shattered Lies	Clive	
2005	The Unknown (Clawed: The Legend of Sasquatch)	Ray	
2008	Triloquist	Bartender	
2010	Changing Hands	Dr. Williams	
2012	Always Faithful	Pastor	
2012	My Trip Back to the Dark Side	'Shark'	
2013	Revelation Road: The Beginning of the End	'Onionhead'	
2026	The First Circle	Thug	

== Television ==
Year	Title	Role	Notes
1995–1996; 1999–2005; 2026–	The Young and the Restless	Larry Warton	
