= My Antonia (film) =

- Genre: Drama
- Based on: My Ántonia by Willa Cather
- Written by: Victoria Riskin
- Directed by: Joseph Sargent
- Starring: Jason Robards; Eva Marie Saint; Neil Patrick Harris
- Music by: David Shire
- Country of origin: United States
- Original language: English

Production
- Executive producer: David W. Rintels
- Producer: Victoria Riskin
- Cinematography: Robert Primes
- Editor: Debra Karen
- Running time: 90 minutes
- Production companies: Gideon Productions; Fast Track Films; Wilshire Court Productions

Original release
- Network: USA Network
- Release: March 29, 1995

My Antonia is a 1995 American drama television film directed by Joseph Sargent and written and produced by Victoria Riskin, based on the 1918 novel of the same name by Willa Cather. It stars Jason Robards, Eva Marie Saint and Neil Patrick Harris. It was filmed in part at the Stuhr Museum in Grand Island, Nebraska, and aired on the USA Network on March 29, 1995.

== Cast ==
- Jason Robards as Josiah Burden
- Eva Marie Saint as Emmaline Burden
- Neil Patrick Harris as Jimmy Burden
- Jan Triska as Mr. Shimerda
- Norbert Weisser as Otto
- Anne Tremko as Lena Lingard
- Travis Fine as Harry Paine
- Mira Furlan as Mrs. Shimerda
- Elina Löwensohn as Antonia Shimerda
- Bobby Goldstein as Ambrosch Shimerda
- T. Max Graham as Mr. Harling
- John Livingston as Charley Harling
- Pas Sarah Bernhardt as Sally Harling
- Devon Arielle Cahill as Nina Harling
- Lauren Montgomery as Yulka Shimerda
- Cinnamon Schultz as Helga
- Megan Birdsall as Margaret
- Lemarrt Holman as Blindman Arnault
- Abby Sullivan as Mrs. Carlsen
- Betty Laird as Mrs. Vannis
- Brendan McCurdy as Ambrosch Cuzak
- Ian Atwood as Leo Cuzak
- Tom Wees as Conductor
- Brad Boesen as Traveling Salesman
- Endre Hules as Russian Peter
- Boris Lee Krutonog as Russian Pavel
- Olek Krupa as Krajiek
- Kyla Pratt as Yulka Cuzak
- Myra Turley as Mrs. Harling
- Blair Williamson as Marek Shimerda
