= Uncle Sam (film) =

- DVD released by Blue Underground
- Directed by: William Lustig
- Written by: Larry Cohen
- Produced by: George G. Braunstein
- Starring: David Fralick; Christopher Ogden; Leslie Neale; Bo Hopkins; Matthew Flint; Anne Tremko; Isaac Hayes
- Cinematography: James A. Lebovitz
- Edited by: Bob Murawski
- Music by: Mark Governor
- Production company: A-Pix Entertainment
- Distributed by: Solomon International Pictures
- Release date: November 13, 1996 (Greece)
- Running time: 89 minutes
- Country: United States
- Language: English
- Budget: $2 million

Uncle Sam is a 1996 American political satire black comedy slasher film directed by William Lustig, written by Larry Cohen. Starring David Fralick as the military who was killed and his corpse returned in time for the Independence Day, Christopher Ogden, Leslie Neale, Bo Hopkins, Matthew Flint, Anne Tremko and Isaac Hayes also stars.

In the film, Sam Harper is killed by friendly fire during a military operation in Kuwait. His corpse is returned to his family in time for the Independence Day celebrations, but then returns to life as a revenant. Sam dresses himself in an Uncle Sam costume and goes on a killing spree. His widow and his sister inform Sam's nephew that Sam was a psychopath in life, and that he joined the military in hopes of satisfying his bloodlust. Meanwhile, Sam blames his former mentor for glorifying war in his tales, and for inspiring him to join the military.

== Plot ==
In Kuwait, a military unit uncovers an American helicopter that was downed by friendly fire. As the wreckage is inspected, Master Sergeant Sam Harper, one of the burnt bodies within, springs to life and kills a sergeant and a major. He finally dies after muttering, "Don't be afraid, it's only friendly fire!"

Sam's body is eventually delivered to his hometown of Twin Rivers, which is preparing for Independence Day. Sam's widow Louise is given custody of the casket containing Sam's remains, which are left in the home of Sam's estranged sister Sally, who lives with her patriotic young son Jody. Sam reanimates as a revenant in the early hours of the Fourth of July, and proceeds to kill and steal the costume of a perverted Uncle Sam. Sam then makes his way to a cemetery, where he murders two of three juvenile delinquents who had vandalized tombstones, and desecrated an American flag.

During the Independence Day celebration (in which corrupt congressman Alvin Cummings is visiting), Sam beheads the third delinquent (who sang the National Anthem at the start of the festival in a juvenile manner); kills Jody's teacher (who opposed the Vietnam War) with a hatchet; shoots Sally's unscrupulous lawyer boyfriend Ralph in the head; and kills a teenage girl (who was caught earlier smoking marijuana) running the BBQ stand by burning her face on the grill after she discovers the third delinquent’s severed head on said grill.

Despite these deaths, the festivities continue, but are thrown into disarray when Sam uses the fireworks gear to blow up Congressman Cummings, and impales Louise’s deputy boyfriend Phil with an American flag. As this occurs, Jody is told by his mother and aunt that Sam, his ostensibly heroic idol, was in fact an alcoholic psychopath who physically and sexually abused them, and only joined the military so he could get a "free pass" to kill people.

Jody is told by Barry, a blind boy who has established a mental link with Sam, that the undead Sam is responsible for the deaths. With help from Sam's old mentor Jed, the boys go to Jody's house, where they find the lecherous sergeant Twinning, who dropped Sam off, dead and stuffed inside Sam's coffin. Realizing that Sam will probably go after Louise, the boys and Jed go to her home, where Sam confronts and blames Jed, who told him tales of how glorious combat was, for his current state. Jed retorts by telling Sam that he only killed for the sake of killing rather than for his country.

Jed's gun proves ineffective against Sam, so he and Louise go to get Jed's cannon while Jody, who Sam claims is the reason he came back, keeps Sam occupied. Jody lures Sam outside, and Jed blasts him with the cannon, destroying him and Louise's house in flames. The next day, Sally is happy that Jody no longer looks up to Sam anymore. She watches as Jody burns all of his war-themed toys after learning the truth about Sam.

== Cast ==
- David Fralick as Master Sergeant Sam Harper
- Christopher Ogden as Jody Baker, Sally's son
- Leslie Neale as Sally Baker, Sam's estranged sister
- Bo Hopkins as Sergeant Twining
- Matthew Flint as Deputy Phil Burke
- Anne Tremko as Louise Harper, Sam's wife
- Isaac Hayes as Sergeant Jed Crowley
- William Smith as Major
- Timothy Bottoms as Donald Crandall
- Tim Grimm as Ralph
- P.J. Soles as Madge Cronin
- Tom McFadden as Mac Cronin
- Zachary McLemore as Barry Cronin
- Morgan Paull as The Mayor
- Richard Cummings Jr. as Dan
- Robert Forster as Congressman Alvin Cummings
- Frank Pesce as Barker
- Jason Adelman as Jesse Colbert
- Laura Alcalde as Park Mother
- Raquel Alessi as Girl Student
- Taylor Jones as Boy Student
- Abby Ball as Rick
- Stanton Barrett as Clete
- Mark Chadwick as Willie On Stilts
- Chris Durand as Sergeant
- Desirae Klein as Barbeque Girl
- Jason Lustig as The Undertaker
- Joseph Vitare as Kuwaiti Captain

== Reception ==
Dread Central called Uncle Sam a "way underrated slasher flick," that "does a fine job of bringing the pain while we celebrate our independence," even though it "kind of plods along" and "none of it really makes too much sense."

A review by DVD Verdict described the film as "a sluggish, shoddily produced horror/comedy," that was "a by-the-numbers turd that sports embarrassing child actors, C-level stars slumming for a paycheck (oh P.J. Soles, how far you've tumbled...) and a level of suspense that rivals clipping your toenails in a well lit room." Uncle Sam was also derided by The A.V. Club, whose reviewer wrote "Incoherent as social satire and perfunctory and routine as a horror film, Uncle Sam is every bit as lazy and uninspired as the Maniac Cop films that preceded it."

== See also ==
- Maniac Cop, another Lustig-Cohen slasher film with similar themes about the police
