= Todd Boyd =

American academic

- Born: 1964 (age 61–62); Detroit, Michigan
- Other names: Notorious PhD, Dr. B
- Occupations: professor, author, media commentator, film producer, consultant
- Known for: Cinema and Media Studies Professor at the USC School of Cinematic Arts

Todd Boyd, aka "Notorious Ph.D.", is the Katherine and Frank Price Endowed Chair for the Study of Race & Popular Culture and Professor of Cinema and Media Studies in the USC School of Cinematic Arts. Boyd is a media commentator, author, producer, consultant and scholar. He is considered an expert on American popular culture and is known for his pioneering work on cinema, media, hip hop culture, fashion, art, and sports. Boyd received his PhD in Communication Studies from the University of Iowa in 1991 and began his professorial career at USC in the fall of 1992.

== Documentary appearances ==
Since the late 1990s, Boyd has appeared in numerous documentary features and docuseries, including appearances in the award-winning The Last Dance (ESPN, 2020), winner of the 2020 Emmy Award for Outstanding Documentary or Nonfiction Series, and 20 Feet From Stardom (2013), winner of the 2014 Academy Award for Best Documentary Feature and the 2015 Grammy Award for Best Music Film.

Boyd has also appeared in Breakdown: 1975 (Netflix, 2025), We Want the Funk (PBS, 2025), The Crossover: 50 Years of Sports and Hip Hop (ESPN, 2023), Goliath [Wilt Chamberlain] (Showtime, 2023), Say Hey, Willie Mays! (HBO, 2022), Ken Burns' Muhammad Ali (PBS, 2021), Bitchin’: The Sound and Fury of Rick James (Showtime, 2021) Blood Brothers (Netflix, 2021), The Movies (CNN, 2019), Sammy Davis Jr.: I Gotta Be Me (American Masters/PBS, 2019), The Nineties and The 2000s (CNN, 2017, 2018) among numerous other titles.

== Additional filmography ==
- Black and Jewish America: An Interwoven History (PBS, 2026)
- Field Generals: History of the Black Quarterback (Peacock, 2026)
- Breakdown: 1975 (Netflix, 2025)
- The Shuffle (HBO Max, 2025)
- High Horse: The Black Cowboy (Peacock, 2025)
- Seen & Heard: The History of Black Television (HBO Max, 2025)
- We Want the Funk (PBS, 2025)
- I Am Joe Frazier (The CW, 2025)
- Black Comedy in America (Vice TV, 2024)
- Bad Boy: The Decade that Defined Diddy (CNN, 2024)
- TV on the Edge: Moments That Shaped Our Culture (CNN, 2024)
- Evolution of the Black Quarterback (Amazon Prime Video, 2024)
- The Crossover: 50 Years of Sports and Hip Hop (ESPN, 2023)
- Goliath [Wilt Chamberlain] (Showtime, 2023)
- Black Pop: Celebrating the Power of Black Culture (E, 2023)
- Say Hey, Willie Mays! (HBO, 2022)
- Legacy: The True Story of the LA Lakers (Hulu, 2022)
- Right To Offend: The Black Comedy Revolution (Comedy Central, 2022)
- The Great Debate with Charles Barkley (TBS, 2022)
- We Need to Talk About Cosby (Showtime, January 2022)
- Ken Burns’ Muhammad Ali (PBS, 2021)
- Bitchin’: The Sound and Fury of Rick James (Showtime, 2021)
- Blood Brothers: Malcolm X & Muhammad Ali (Netflix, 2021)
- Watch the Sound with Mark Ronson, (Apple TV+, July 2021)
- Fear of a Black Quarterback (Vice, 2021)
- Mike Tyson: The Knockout (ABC/Hulu, 2021)
- The Story of Late Night (CNN, 2021)
- The March on Washington: Keepers of the Dream (National Geographic Channel [NGO] 2021)
- Tuskegee Airmen: Legacy of Courage (History Channel, 2021)
- Biography: I Want My MTV (A&E, 2020)
- Blackballed (Quibi, 2020)
- The Last Dance (ESPN, 2020)
- Vick (ESPN, 2020)
- You Ain't Got These (Quibi, 2020)
- Dave Parker: The Cobra in Twilight (MLB Network, 2019)
- College Football 150: The American Game (ESPN, 2019)
- NFL 360: DeSean Jackson's Bond with Nipsey Hussle (NFL Network, 2019)
- A Complicated Man: The Shaft Legacy (Shaft, DVD/Blu-Ray additional features 2019)
- Dennis Rodman: For Better or Worse (30 For 30, ESPN, 2019)
- I Am Richard Pryor (Paramount Network/Comedy Central, 2019)
- Sammy Davis Jr.: I Gotta Be Me (American Masters/PBS, 2019)
- American Style (CNN, 2019)
- The Super Bowl That Wasn't (NFL Network, 2019)
- Shut Up and Dribble (Showtime, 2018)
- The 2000s (CNN, 2018)
- "Ed Gordon Presents: Am I Black Enough?" feature documentary (Brown Sugar/Bounce TV, 2018)
- Death Row Chronicles (BET, 2018)
- The History of Comedy (CNN, 2017)
- The Nineties (CNN, 2017)
- American Race (TNT, May 2017)
- The LA Riots: 25 Years Later (History Channel, 2017)
- Soundtracks: Songs That Defined History (CNN, 2017)
- Soundbreaking: Stories from the Cutting Edge of Recorded Music (PBS, 2016)
- At All Costs: Life Inside the World of AAU Basketball (Netflix, 2016)
- Jim Brown: A Football Life (NFL Network, 2016)
- (Roots of Fight Presents) Ali: Birth of the Greatest (Spike TV, 2016)
- Streets of Compton (A&E, 2016)
- The Drew: No Excuse, Just Produce (Showtime, 2016)
- Fresh Dressed (CNN Films, 2015)
- Trojan Wars (30 For 30, ESPN, 2015)
- Richard Pryor: Icon (PBS, 2014)
- 20 Feet From Stardom (2013) [Academy Award for Best Documentary Feature, 2014]
- Iceberg Slim: Portrait of a Pimp (Showtime, 2012)
- The Godfather Legacy (The History Channel, 2012)
- Scarface: The Inside Story (Biography Channel, 2012)
- Uprising: Hip Hop and the L.A. Riots (Rock Docs, VH1, 2012)
- Planet Rock: The Story of Hip and the Crack Generation (Rock Docs, VH1, 2011)
- Runnin' Rebels of UNLV (HBO, 2011)
- Straight Outta L.A. (30 For 30, ESPN, 2010)
- Why We Laugh: Black Comedians on Black Comedy (Showtime, 2009)
- Crips and Bloods: Made in America (Independent Lens, PBS, 2008)
- N.W.A.: The World's Most Dangerous Group (Rock Docs, VH1, 2008)
- Notorious B.I.G.: Bigger Than Life (BET, 2007)
- Dare Not Walk Alone (NAACP Image Award Nominee, 2006)
- Perfect Upset: 1985 Georgetown vs. Villanova NCAA Championship (HBO, 2005)
- The O.J. Verdict (Frontline/PBS, 2005)
- The N Word (Feature Documentary, 2004)
- O.J. Simpson: A Study in Black and White (HBO, 2002)
- Bill Russell: My Life, My Way (HBO, 2000)
- The Harlem Globetrotters (Biography/A&E, 1999)

== Video Essays ==
Boyd’s video essay Basquiat: Bebop 2 Hip Hop featuring Dr. Todd Boyd (2021) is part of The Broad museum series, “Time Decorated: The Musical Influences of Jean-Michel Basquiat.” His video essay “Dr. Todd Boyd on David Hammons” (2021) is a part of The Broad’s series “Up Close.”

== Books, articles and essays ==
Boyd is the author/editor of eight books and over 100 articles, essays, reviews, and other forms of commentary.

His books include Rapper’s Deluxe: How Hip Hop Made the World (Phaidon, 2024), The Notorious Ph.D’s Guide to the Super Fly 70s (Broadway/Random House, 2007), Young Black Rich and Famous: The Rise of the NBA, the Hip Hop Invasion, and the Transformation of American Culture (Doubleday/Random House, 2003), The New H.N.I.C: The Death of Civil Rights and the Reign of Hip Hop (NYU Press, 2002) and Am I Black Enough for You? Public Culture from the ‘Hood and Beyond (Indiana University Press, 1997). He is also the editor of African Americans and Popular Culture Vol. 1–3 (Praeger/Greenwood, 2008), Basketball Jones: America Above the Rim (with Kenneth Shropshire, NYU Press, 2000) and Out of Bounds: Sports, Media and the Politics of Identity (with Aaron Baker, Indiana University Press, 1997).

His written work has also appeared in the New York Times, Los Angeles Times, Chicago Tribune, The Guardian, ESPN, and The Root.

== Cinema ==
Boyd was the executive producer for the Netflix documentary, At All Costs (2016). He was writer/producer on the Paramount Pictures cult classic film The Wood (1999).

He has also provided voice-over commentary on the DVD edition of the films Stormy Weather (1943), Cabin in the Sky (1943), Super Fly (1972), and Uptown Saturday Night (1974).

== Publications ==
- Rapper’s Deluxe: How Hip Hop Made the World: ISBN 1838666222 (Phaidon, 2024)
- African Americans and Popular Culture, Vol 1–3: ISBN 0-2759-8922-4 (Praeger, 2008)
- The Notorious PhD's Guide to the Super Fly 70s: ISBN 0-7679-2187-9 (Harlem Moon/Broadway/Random House, 2007)
- Young Black Rich and Famous: The Rise of the NBA, the Hip Hop Invasion, and the Transformation of American Culture: ISBN 0-7679-1277-2 (Doubleday/Random House, 2003)
- The New H.N.I.C: The Death of Civil Rights and the Reign of Hip Hop: ISBN 0-8147-9896-9 (NYU Press, 2002)
- Basketball Jones: America Above the Rim: ISBN 0-8147-1316-5 (NYU Press, 2000)
- Out of Bounds: Sports, Media and the Politics of Identity: ISBN 0-253-21095-X (Indiana University Press, 1997)
- Am I Black Enough For You? : Popular Culture from the 'Hood and Beyond: ISBN 0-253-21105-0 (Indiana University Press, 1997)
