= Lloyd Avery II =

American actor (1969–2005)

- 21.06.1990
- Born: Lloyd Fernandez Avery II; June 21, 1969; Los Angeles, California, U.S.
- Died: September 4, 2005 (aged 36); Crescent City, California, U.S.
- Cause of death: Homicide
- Occupation: Actor
- Years active: 1990–2001

Lloyd Fernandez Avery II (June 21, 1969 – September 4, 2005) was an American actor. He appeared in John Singleton's Oscar-nominated film Boyz n the Hood (1991) as one of the Bloods who murdered high school football star Ricky Baker (played by Morris Chestnut) and was later killed by Doughboy (played by Ice Cube) in retaliation.

In 2005, Avery was convicted of double homicide, and was sentenced to life in prison. He was murdered at Pelican Bay State Prison.

== Early life ==
Lloyd Avery was born in Los Angeles, California, to Lloyd Avery Sr. a self-employed service technician and Linda Avery, a stay at home mom who later worked for a bank. Avery has four siblings, three brothers and one sister. He grew up in View Park, an affluent, mostly African-American neighborhood in Los Angeles.

Avery attended and graduated from Beverly Hills High School where he played baseball and waterpolo. In high school, Avery became friends with the children of singer Smokey Robinson, music producer Quincy Jones, and music executive Clarence Avant. Avery briefly attended Los Angeles Trade-Technical College and aspired to have a career in music.

== Career ==
Avery became acquainted with director John Singleton while Singleton was a film student at USC. Singleton later wrote and directed the 1991 film Boyz n the Hood. Avery was cast in a minor bit role in the film. After the film's success, Avery obtained an agent and frequently went on auditions. He landed a short stint on the hit television series Doogie Howser, M.D..

Avery continued to hone his music career and produced the lead single Push on the debut album of singer/actress Tisha Campbell. The song was also featured in an episode of the popular TV sitcom Martin. In 1993, Singleton cast Avery in his next film Poetic Justice.

In 2000, Avery starred as Nate in the 2000 film Lockdown. In 2001, he played G-Ride in the 2001 independent film Shot.

== Arrest and death ==
In 2001, soon after wrapping Shot, Avery was arrested and charged with a double homicide for shooting two random people. The victims were Annette Lewis and Percy Branch, who were killed on July 1, 1999. He was sentenced to life in prison after being convicted of first degree murder.

On September 4, 2005, Avery was murdered in Crescent City, California, at the age of 36. He was strangled as part of a Satanic ritual conducted by his Pelican Bay State Prison cellmate Kevin Roby. Roby was previously convicted of raping and murdering his sister Velmalin Hill in 1987 and was serving life without parole for that crime. In August 2024, while incarcerated at the California Institution for Men, Roby allegedly stabbed and injured a correctional officer.

== Filmography ==
=== Film ===
Year	Title	Role	Notes
1991	Boyz n the Hood	Knucklehead #2	
1993	Poetic Justice	Thug #1	
1996	Don't Be a Menace to South Central While Drinking Your Juice in the Hood	Guy in Back Seat	uncredited role
1999	The Breaks	Man in Jail	uncredited role
2000	Lockdown	Nate	
2001	Shot	G-Ride	

=== Television ===
Year	Title	Role	Notes
1992	Doogie Howser, M.D.	Red	Episode: "Dangerous Reunions"
