= Destination: Imagination =

2008 television special

- Foster's Home for Imaginary Friends episodes
- Mac, Bloo, Wilt, Eduardo, and Coco are warned of the dangers of their quest to find Frankie.
- Episode nos.: Season 6 Episodes 6–8
- Directed by: Craig McCracken; Rob Renzetti; Robert Alvarez (animation); Eric Pringle (animation)
- Written by: Lauren Faust; Tim McKeon
- Story by: Craig McCracken; Lauren Faust; Darrick Bachman; Rob Renzetti; Ed Baker; Tim McKeon; Vaughn Tada; Alex Kirwan
- Cinematography by: Ninky Harley
- Production code: 611-613
- Original air date: November 27, 2008
- Running time: 65 minutes

Guest appearance
- Max Burkholder as World

Episode chronology
← Previous "Race for Your Life, Mac and Bloo!"	Next → "The Bloo Superdude and The Great Creator of Everything's Awesome Ceremony of Fun That He's Not Invited To"

"Destination: Imagination" is a television special of the animated television series Foster's Home for Imaginary Friends. The plot of the special follows Frankie, who becomes trapped in a huge, mysterious world where she is treated like royalty but forced not to leave. Bloo, Mac, Coco, Eduardo, and Wilt journey through the world to rescue her, facing perils and challenges along the way.

Written by Lauren Faust and Tim McKeon, "Destination: Imagination" was directed by Rob Renzetti and series creator Craig McCracken. The plot was conceived after the crew decided that they wanted to make an episode with adventure, featuring the characters going out on a large quest of sorts. Due to the dark and serious storytelling approach used, the special came out "edgier" than most episodes of Foster's Home for Imaginary Friends.

"Destination: Imagination" was originally broadcast on Cartoon Network on November 27, 2008 (Thanksgiving Day 2008). It won the Primetime Emmy Award for Outstanding Animated Program (for Programming One Hour or More). It was also nominated for two Annie Awards—one for Best Animated Television Production Produced for Children and another for McCracken and Renzetti's directing.

== Plot ==
Frankie Foster has grown enraged about her job as the caretaker of Foster's Home for Imaginary Friends, doing endless chores for Mr. Herriman and the house residents, who show her little to no gratitude. When Frankie discovers a chained toy box left on the doorstep, Herriman instructs her to leave it in the attic. Frankie intentionally ignores Herriman's order and peeks inside the box. Upon falling inside, she discovers it is a vast world filled with anthropomorphic toys and delectable treats, and sympathizes with a young boy's voice (Max Burkholder), who tells her he has been living alone in the toy chest since his family left the box at Foster's. Frankie adores the world and secretly visits it every day, being treated like royalty by the voice. One day, when she attempts to leave, the voice locks every exit of the castle Frankie resides in. While investigating Frankie's sudden disappearance, Bloo, Mac, Coco, Eduardo, and Wilt go up to the attic and enter the toy box, discovering the vast world that resides in it. They ask around a town of Frankie's whereabouts but the faceless toy residents do not respond. A group of weeble policemen chase after the gang, but they are saved by a heroic man. He warns them that their pursuit of Frankie is life-threatening, but they remain determined to rescue her. Meanwhile, Herriman, outraged by Frankie's disappearance, unsuccessfully attempts to find a replacement for her.

After the hero sabotages the gang's attempt to cross a musical bridge, they fall into a pit where sticky material becomes their zombie-like doppelgängers. They escape through a Super Mario-like environment and go to the house of a toy dog, where they are set up for a trap to eat crumpets with sleeping powder. Mac does not eat the crumpets and is able to save the others. As they try to escape, they discover that the policeman, hero, and dog are all controlled by a single face — World, the voice that tended to Frankie — who can animate and control seemingly anything he latches onto. World is trapped on an apple and the gang leaves it at a desert, but it latches on a horse and gallops off to the castle. Having been secretly hiding inside the horse, the gang finds Frankie and attempts to save her. However, Frankie reveals that she was staying of her own free will and is happy to be away from the work at Foster's. The friends then plead with Frankie to come home, insisting that they need her to take care of them, but Frankie, believing their pleas to be selfish, furiously storms off, just before World gasses them and causes them to fall asleep.

The gang, upon awakening, find themselves in a fake version of Foster's created by World, who shrank them into it. After Frankie hears their voices calling to her and finds them shrunk, World becomes upset and accuses Frankie of planning to leave him alone in the toy box forever, but Frankie calms him down enough to befriend and unshrink the gang. Suddenly, Herriman storms into the room, having himself gotten into the toy box to look for Frankie, then angrily berates World for bringing her in the toy box and keeping her from her duties, and declares to take her and the others out of the toy box and leave him by himself, hoping he will think about the actions he has taken. Becoming distraught and outraged by Mr. Herriman's intentions, the entire world crumbles and falls apart as World pursues the gang until it is nothing but a white void. After a long and hard retreat and arriving at the entrance of the box, World becomes furious and turns into a chimera-like creature to attack them all. The gang manages to escape the toy box, after which Frankie climbs out as well and tries to convince everyone to let World out of the box, explaining all his actions were done out of fear of being alone. Herriman yields, admitting to his misjudgment of Frankie and accepting World's release from the box. World adapts to the new environment and lives as a stuffed rag doll Frankie made for him. Mr. Herriman issues a decree to divide the chores between the imaginary friends and thus give Frankie a break from her job. After all the chores are finished, all the imaginary friends in the house are free to travel in and out of the toy box, where they enjoy themselves.

During the post-credits scene, Madame Foster, who was away on her vacation, returns only to be greeted by an empty house and wonders where everyone is.

== Cast ==
- Grey DeLisle as Frankie Foster / Tiny Friend / Little Boy / Lady / Eurotrish
- Sean Marquette as Mac
- Keith Ferguson as Bloo / Captain / Francis
- Phil LaMarr as Wilt / Jackie Khones / Hero / Little Boy's Father
- Candi Milo as Coco / Madame Foster / Purple Puppy / Little Boy's Mother
- Tom Kenny as Eduardo / Belly Bob Norton
- Max Burkholder as World
- Tom Kane as Mr. Herriman

== Production ==
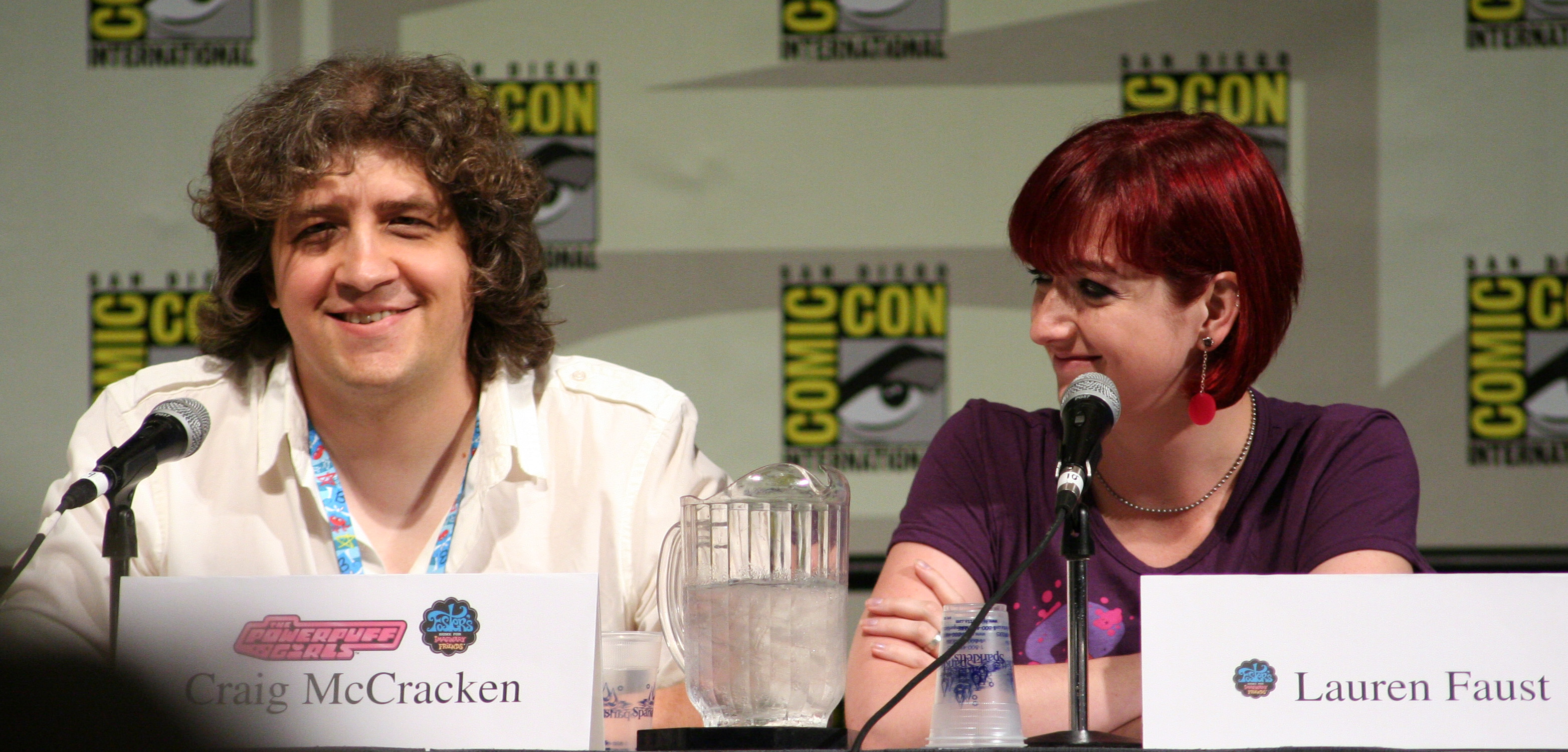
Series co-creators Craig McCracken (left) and Lauren Faust (right) directed and wrote "Destination: Imagination" along with Rob Renzetti and Tim McKeon respectively.

"Destination: Imagination" was co-written by Foster's Home for Imaginary Friends co-creator Lauren Faust along with Tim McKeon. Other series co-creator Craig McCracken directed it along with Rob Renzetti. The special was conceived by the four, along with Darrick Bachman, Edward Baker, Vaughn Tada, and Alex Kirwan, as a means of creating an adventure story, to "send the gang on a fantastic quest".

The character of World was created as a means to have an imaginary friend that was an entire world instead of the usual "sentient being that you hang out with". Baker suggested that the character should be portrayed as a young child, which McCracken agreed because it brought originality to the story, and allowed him to "be more emotional, to not understand the bigger picture, to be confused and vulnerable and like a kid, to throw a fit when they don't get their way".

The special was written with the goal of "telling the story in the most honest and sincere way". The writers attempted to continue the tense and unpleasant relationship between Frankie and Mr. Herriman, which they had begun developing since the series began, but approaching it in a believable and sensible fashion. With the heavy plot running through the special, the writers tried to use Bloo and his companions as a means to add humor into it. They wrote Bloo to be more obnoxious and demanding than previously, but did not want him to be cruel or malicious.

A lot of the special was more "edgy" and dark than what had been done previously on Foster's Home for Imaginary Friends. A major reason behind this was the peril, danger, and conflict that constructed the plot so heavily. McCracken explains, "When we start a show one of the first things we think about is tone, is this a goofy one, is it a serious one, whatever it may be we stay true to that tone. This one had some higher stakes so we let it naturally unfold that way".

== Reception ==
"Destination: Imagination" was originally broadcast on Thanksgiving Day, November 27, 2008, on Cartoon Network, at 8:00 P.M. EST. It followed an afternoon-long marathon of the animated series Chowder and the series finale and Thanksgiving special of My Gym Partner's a Monkey, entitled "A Thanksgiving Carol". The first special for the series, entitled "Good Wilt Hunting," had also aired on Thanksgiving, back in 2006. At the 61st Primetime Emmy Awards, the special won the award for "Outstanding Animated Program (More Than One Hour)", winning over Spike TV's Afro Samurai: Resurrection. It was nominated for two Annie Awards for Best Animated Television Production Produced for Children and Directing for an Animated Television Production or Short Form. The special lost both to Nickelodeon's Avatar: The Last Airbender.

Newsarama reporter Steve Fritz called it "one of the best and—well—most imaginative chapters, ever." Fritz praised Tom Kane and Grey DeLisle's performance as Mr. Herriman and Frankie, calling it "stellar," along with the dark and "edgy" undertones of the special.
