= Treat Her Like a Lady (Joe song) =

Single by Joe

from the album My Name Is Joe
- Released: May 22, 2000
- Length: 4:17
- Label: Jive
- Songwriters: Steve Huff; Isaac Hayes
- Producer: Steve "Stone" Huff

Joe singles chronology
"I Wanna Know" (1999)	"Treat Her Like a Lady" (2000)	"Stutter" (2000)

"Treat Her Like a Lady" is a song by American R&B singer Joe. It was written by Steve "Stone" Huff and Isaac Hayes and produced by Huff for Joe's third studio album My Name is Joe (2000). Released as the album's second single in May 2000, it reached number 63 on the US Billboard Hot 100 and number 15 on the Billboard Hot R&B/Hip-Hop Songs chart, becoming the album's lowest-charting single.

== Track listings ==
- Promo Version
1. "Treat Her Like A Lady" - 4:17
- European 12" Promo Version
1. "Treat Her Like A Lady" - 4:17
2. "I'm Missing You" - 4:25
3. "Soon As I Get Paid" - 3:13
- CD Single Version
1. "Treat Her Like A Lady" - 4:17
2. "I'm Missing You" - 4:25
- Maxi Single Version
1. "Treat Her Like A Lady" - 4:17
2. "I'm Missing You" - 4:25
3. "Soon As I Get Paid" - 3:13
4. "No One Else Comes Close" - 3:50

== Credits and personnel ==
Credits for "Treat Her Like a Lady" major single releases.

- Andy Blakelock – engineer
- Joel Campbell – producer
- Tom Coyne - mastering engineer
- Stephen George – mixing
- Allen Gordon Jr. – producer
- Jean-Marie Horvat – mixing
- Steve "Stone" Huff – producer
- Joe - featured artist, primary artist, vocals
- Tim Kelley - producer
- Andrew Lyn – mixing assistant
- Angelo Qauglia – engineer
- Bob Robinson – producer
- Brian Smith – mixing, engineer
- Jeff Vereb – engineer

== Charts ==
=== Weekly charts ===
Chart (2000)	Peak position
Australia (ARIA)	170
Netherlands (Dutch Top 40 Tipparade)	13
UK Singles (OCC)	60
UK Hip Hop/R&B (OCC)	10
US Billboard Hot 100	63
US Hot R&B/Hip-Hop Songs (Billboard)	15

=== Year-end charts ===
Chart (2000)	Position
US Hot R&B/Hip-Hop Singles & Tracks (Billboard)	36

== Release history ==
Region	Date	Format(s)	Label	Ref.
United States	May 22–23, 2000	Urban radio	Jive	
United States	May 30, 2000	Urban adult contemporary radio	Jive	
United Kingdom	July 3, 2000	12-inch vinyl; CD	Jive	
