= True Women =

1997 television film miniseries

- Theatrical release poster
- Written by: Janice Woods Windle; Christopher Lofton
- Directed by: Karen Arthur
- Starring: Dana Delany; Annabeth Gish; Angelina Jolie
- Music by: Bruce Broughton
- Country of origin: United States
- Original language: English

Production
- Executive producer: Craig Anderson
- Producers: Terence A. Donnelly; Christopher Lofton; Lynn Raynor
- Cinematography: Tom Neuwirth
- Editor: Corky Ehlers
- Running time: 177 minutes

Original release
- Network: CBS
- Release: May 18 – May 20, 1997

True Women is a 1997 two-part American Western television miniseries based on the 1993 novel by Janice Woods Windle. It was directed by Karen Arthur and stars Dana Delany, Annabeth Gish, and Angelina Jolie, supported by an ensemble cast including Tina Majorino, Rachael Leigh Cook, Michael York, Salli Richardson-Whitfield, Julie Carmen, Michael Greyeyes, Powers Boothe and Charles S. Dutton. It was first aired on CBS over two nights in May 1997.

Filmed in Austin, San Antonio, and McDade, Texas, the series covers five decades, from the Texas Revolution through Native American uprisings and the Civil War to the early stages of the women's suffrage movement.

The miniseries marks the debut of sisters Hilary and Haylie Duff, who were uncredited.

== Plot ==
=== Part 1 ===
1835 Lawshe Plantation, Georgia : Young Euphemia "Phemie" Ashby learns her father died of a heart attack. Phemie's brother-in-law Bartlett McClure takes Phemie to live with her older sister Sarah McClure in Peach Creek, Texas. Phemie reunites with her brother Travis, and her old slave-nanny, Tildy. Sarah worries that war with "generalísimo dictator" Santa Anna will recall her husband Bartlett to Hays's Texas Rangers. After Santa Anna burns Fort Alamo, Sam Houston appoints Sarah to lead families East, joining the Runaway Scrape. After fending off raiders demanding gold, Sarah prevents a mutiny by widows of the Goliad massacre. Struggling to ford the Brazos River, Sara miscarries, and her baby Johnnie dies in Phemie's arms. Jennie Boles takes a lead rope across the Brazos for the ferry they build. Later they observe the Battle of San Jacinto. Sarah and Bartlett return to start building a new home in the newly established Republic of Texas.

Meanwhile, a redneck attacks Georgia Virginia Lawshe as a "squaw baby" of her mother, named Cherokee by her Tukabatchee mother. Georgia's father Lewis plans to move to Texas to protect them all, but Cherokee determines to stay on their land. Georgia witnesses racists burn their barn, shoot their slave Josiah, and lynch his Creek wife Tobe, while President Jackson's soldiers drive natives to Fort Hawkins. Likewise, Bartlett is ordered to fight Comanches. On horseback, Sarah jumps a gorge, narrowly escaping capture by Comanche warrior Tarantula.

Seven years later. Peach Creek, Texas : Their new home completed, Phemie sets out to marry William King. Tarantula wants Sarah for his wife; she appeases him with horses instead. Bartlett finds John and Ester Lochart's whole family slain, except their daughter, Euphemia's close friend Maddie, who was abducted by Comanches.

Cherokee's brother Madison dies; Georgia inherits his half-Negro slave-daughter, her "crabby" cousin Martha Benett. Ed Tomas assigns duties for Martha, who starts an uneasy friendship with Georgia as she becomes enamored of Dr. Peter Woods.

Phemie rebukes Travis' racist remark, making Tildy her "unofficial sister." Comanches torture Tildy, dragging her with stolen horses. Sarah tells Phemie to kill her if captured while rescuing Tildy, then kill her son and herself as a last resort; "You do what you have to do." With both Tildy and Sarah strung up to a tree, Phemie takes aim.

=== Part 2 ===
1842 Peach Creek, Texas : Taruntula arrives, releases Sarah, and removes the arrow his Comanche shot into her leg, saying she will "not ride horse with wings again," (referring to Sarah's magnificent leap over the gorge in Part 1) For fiercely defending Sarah against him, he names Phemie, "Brave Squaw Child," gifting his medicine bag.

Lawshe Plantation hosts a formal ball; Peter loves Georgia's unique "one-quarter real gloves," alluding to her Creek heritage. He suggests Texas needs doctors; she proposes marriage.

Comanches release Maddie, her face badly disfigured by hot coal burns inflicted by Chief Dark Moon. Bartlett tries in vain to stop violence at the Comanche treaty signing. Promoted to circuit Judge, Bartlett's snake-bitten horse throws him to his death. Grief-stricken, Sarah sends Phemie away to "learn about life for a change instead of death" at a school in Gonzales, Texas, where Peter and Georgia Woods arrive with Ed and Martha. Doctor Woods treats a cholera outbreak, and admonishes Georgia for blaspheming God's "little joke on women" after witnessing Nellie dying in childbirth; they reconcile. While swimming pregnant, she encounters a man dead from cholera, but refuses to abandon their four-thousand acre cotton farm. Sarah ends her mourning, converting her home into Peach Creek Inn. Euphemia reunites with Georgia, but states her discomfort about owning slaves. Later, both Georgia and Martha bear sons. Euphemia determines to author a Texas Revolution history from women's perspectives, and to raise the best horses in Texas; she and William marry. Georgia's baby dies from cholera, but their first harvest nets a profit that she reinvests, building the Woods' home, and better slave housing.

Through the years, Euphemia and Georgia bear many more children. Mr. Walker advises Euphemia not to free Tildy, as being perceived as an abolitionist might ruin William's reputation. Without independent authority, Sarah advises Euphemia to get "the vote for women" to change the laws and end slavery. Euphemia and Georgia argue opposing political views. Peter, William, and Sarah's son Joel fight in the American Civil War, as women make bullets for the Confederacy. Sarah advises Euphemia that she needs Georgia's oratory skills to fight for women's suffrage. But Georgia expects Euphemia's friendship, not her politics.

Joel returns and soon dies after the Battle of Shelbyville. Georgia frees her slaves on June 19th, 1865, two years after President Lincoln's 1863 Emancipation Proclamation; Martha and Ed choose to stay. William returns unscathed; Peter returns injured, and becomes an Austin delegate to draft a new constitution. Union Captain Haller designates the Woods' home his headquarters for Reconstruction forces occupying San Marcos, forcing Georgia into slave quarters. When Georgia's daughter Little Sweet fires at Haller, he threatens attempted murder charges to bed Georgia's teen daughter Cherokee Woods. Georgia spits in his face, and he tries raping her, but bloody coughing fits incapacitate him. Tempting sex, Cherokee lures Haller into the stables where Georgia shoots him dead. They bury him secretly.

Reconciling as friends, Euphemia recruits Georgia to gather signatures to petition the capital for women's suffrage in Texas' new constitution. Georgia passionately rebuts the honorable Speaker, inciting a retaliatory "Women No Vote" barn burning attack after Peter returns home from Washington, D.C.. Georgia contracts Haller's respiratory illness from his attempted rape. Euphemia gifts Tarantula's medicine bag before Georgia dies. Later in town, Euphemia gifts the elderly Tarantula her horse, "You shouldn't have to walk," as the crowd observes.

Epilogue : Years later, Euphemia reminisces, "They've made myths out of us." Sarah replies, "We endured...two old Texan women."

== Cast ==
- Dana Delany as Sarah Ashby McClure, Euphemia's older sister
- Annabeth Gish as Euphemia Ashby
- Angelina Jolie as Georgia Virginia Lawshe Woods
- Tina Majorino as Young Euphemia Ashby
- Rachael Leigh Cook as Young Georgia Lawshe
- Michael York as Lewis Lawshe, Georgia's father
- Jeffrey Nordling as Dr. Peter Woods
- Salli Richardson as Martha, Georgia's cousin
- Tony Todd as Ed Tomas, Lewis Lawshe's slave
- Terrence Mann as Captain Haller
- Julie Carmen as Cherokee Lawshe, Georgia's mother
- Matthew Glave as William King
- John Schneider as Sam Houston
- Michael Greyeyes as Tarantula, a Comanche warrior leader
- Anne Tremko as Matilda Lochart, Euphemia's friend
- Irene Bedard as Tobe, Josiah's Creek wife
- Powers Boothe as Bartlett McClure, Sarah's husband
- Charles S. Dutton as Josiah, slave of Georgia's grandfather Benjamin
- Khadijah Karriem as Tildy, Euphemia's slave nanny
- Oriana Huron as Cherokee (@ 18), Georgia's older daughter
- Karey Green as Little Sweet, Georgia's younger daughter
- Reed Frerichs as Travis McClure (@ 20), Euphemia's brother
- Kevin Page as Soldier (Goliad), a Goliad massacre survivor
- Staci Anderson as Jennie Boles, who fords the Brazos
- Miles Fisher as Travis McClure (@ 13)
- Shannon Woodward as Young Cherokee Woods (uncredited), Georgia's daughter as a girl
- Haylie Duff as a child Extra (uncredited)
- Hilary Duff as a child Extra (uncredited)

== Awards and nominations ==
True Women awards and nominations
Year	Award	Category	Nominee(s)	Result	Ref.
1997	Primetime Emmy	Outstanding Music Composition for a Miniseries or a Special	Bruce Broughton	Nominated	
1998	Lone Star Film & Television Award	Best Actress	Dana Delany	Won	
1998	ALMA	Outstanding Individual Performance in a Made-for-Television Movie or Mini-Series in a Crossover Role	Julie Carmen	Nominated	
