= Stutter (Joe song) =

2001 single by Joe

Single by Joe featuring Mystikal

from the album My Name Is Joe
- Released: January 2, 2001
- Genre: R&B; hip hop
- Length: 3:53 (album version); 3:33 (single and radio edit)
- Label: Jive
- Songwriters: Ernest E. Dixon; Roy "Royalty" Hamilton
- Producers: Roy "Royalty" Hamilton; Teddy Riley

Joe singles chronology
"Treat Her Like a Lady" (2000)	"Stutter" (2001)	"Let's Stay Home Tonight" (2001)

Mystikal singles chronology
"Danger (Been So Long)" (2000)	"Stutter" (2000)	"Bouncin' Back (Bumpin' Me Against the Wall)" (2001)

Music video
- "Stutter (Remix)" on YouTube

Audio
- "Stutter" (original version) on YouTube

"Stutter" is a song by American R&B singer Joe, from his third studio album My Name Is Joe (2000). The original version of the song was produced by Roy "Royalty" Hamilton and Teddy Riley and written by Roy "Royalty" Hamilton and Ernest E. Dixon.

A remix by Allen "Allstar" Gordon Jr. (marketed as the Double Take Remix due to its appearance in the 2001 film Double Take) features rapper Mystikal and was a number-one hit on the US Billboard Hot 100 for four weeks in 2001. It was one of three singles to have sold over 500,000 copies in the US in 2001.

== Composition ==
The original version of "Stutter" is slower, more mellow and has no samples; however, the Double Take remix featuring Mystikal (with its faster tempo) samples "Passin' Me By" by the Pharcyde which itself samples "Summer in the City" by Quincy Jones.

=== Sampling lawsuit ===
On March 30, 2001, Los Angeles-based producer J-Swift sued Jive Records for $11 million for using a Pharcyde sample in the remix of "Stutter" without crediting him by name. Swift told MTV News if he was credited as the original producer of Joe's "Stutter" R&B remix for sampling the Pharcyde's 1992 hit single "Passin' Me By"; he stated "People were coming up to me, congratulating me, asking how much I was getting paid". He continued "I went into the store to see if I had been credited, and saw everyone's name listed but mine." Swift even went far to say that the melody and lyrics were stolen and interpolated, using the lyrics that was said by Fatlip. "They used my actual music," his statement continued. "They even stole the lyrics and melody that I wrote. 'My dear, my dear, my dear, you do not know me.' I own more of that song than anybody." Eventually, the suit got dropped due to failing to respond to the allegations.

== Music video ==
The song and video for "Stutter" refer to Joe's girlfriend, who comes home early in the morning while he wakes up and they discuss where she had been. She's "stuttering" because it seems she is lying to him about having an affair. Joe's close friend, portrayed by rapper Mystikal, follows and spies on her while she sleeps with another man in a motel, called the "Easy Rest-In", taping it on video. After she leaves, she and Mystikal are driving next to each other on the road, while they discuss the bad situation. Arriving home, Joe's girlfriend notes the video in their television, turning out it was her evil twin sister having that affair. Both the girlfriend and the twin sister were played by actress Natashia Williams.

== Live performance ==
On April 10, 2001, Joe and Mystikal performed the song live at the 7th Blockbuster Entertainment Awards.

== Charts ==
=== Weekly charts ===
Chart (2001)	Peak position
Australia (ARIA)	19
Australian Urban (ARIA)	6
Austria (Ö3 Austria Top 40)	62
Belgium (Ultratip Bubbling Under Flanders)	13
Canada (Nielsen SoundScan)	32
Europe (Eurochart Hot 100)	35
France (SNEP)	81
Germany (GfK)	12
Netherlands (Dutch Top 40)	17
Netherlands (Single Top 100)	18
New Zealand (Recorded Music NZ)	42
Scotland Singles (OCC)	39
Sweden (Sverigetopplistan)	44
Switzerland (Schweizer Hitparade)	14
UK Singles (OCC)	7
UK Dance (OCC)	5
UK Indie (OCC)	1
UK Hip Hop/R&B (OCC)	1
US Billboard Hot 100	1
US Hot R&B/Hip-Hop Songs (Billboard)	1
US Pop Airplay (Billboard)	12
US Rhythmic Airplay (Billboard)	3

=== Year-end charts ===
Chart (2001)	Position
Brazil (Crowley)	70
Canada Radio (Nielsen BDS)	99
UK Singles (OCC)	140
UK Urban (Music Week)	2
US Billboard Hot 100	13
US Hot R&B/Hip-Hop Singles & Tracks (Billboard)	5
US Mainstream Top 40 (Billboard)	51
US Rhythmic Top 40 (Billboard)	8

== Certifications ==
Region	Certification	Certified units/sales
United States (RIAA)	Gold	500,000

== Release history ==
Region	Date	Format(s)	Label(s)	Ref.
United States	January 2, 2001	CD	Jive	
United Kingdom	February 5, 2001	12-inch vinyl; CD; cassette	Jive	
Australia	March 12, 2001	CD	Jive	

== Cover versions ==
- Rock group My Darkest Days covered the song on their 2012 release Sick and Twisted Affair, and have been performing the rock version live since 2008.
- American rapper-singer Becky G covered the song in 2015 as an upload to her YouTube page with a rewritten rap added to her version instead of performing Mystikal's verse.
