= Sean Marquette =

American actor (born 1988)

- Marquette at the 2006 San Diego Comic-Con
- Born: June 30, 1988 (age 38); Dallas, Texas, U.S.
- Occupation: Actor
- Years active: 1995–present
- Relatives: Chris Marquette (brother)

Sean Marquette (born June 30, 1988) is an American actor. He is best known for his roles as Young Matt Flamhaff in 13 Going on 30, Johnny Atkins in The Goldbergs and its spin-off Schooled, and for voicing Mac in the Cartoon Network animated series Foster's Home for Imaginary Friends (2004–2009).

== Life and career ==
Marquette's brother, Chris, is also an actor. His father is of Cuban descent. He made his television debut in 1995 on the soap opera All My Children, portraying Jamie Martin.

He has since appeared in numerous television series, including Full-Court Miracle, Without a Trace, NYPD Blue, Standoff, Monk, Still Standing, Ghost Whisperer, In Plain Sight, Bones, and NCIS.

His film credits include Black Mask 2: City of Masks as Raymond, National Lampoon's Van Wilder as Little Kid, Full-Court Miracle as Big Ben Swartz, 13 Going on 30 as Young Matt Flamhaff, Surviving Christmas as the older brother, Grilled as Jeremy Goldbluth, and Remember the Daze as Mod.

Marquette has also worked extensively as a voice actor in animated television series and video games. He became the fifth official voice of Sam Dullard in Nickelodeon's Rocket Power, voicing the character during the show's fourth and final season. He later voiced Mac in the Cartoon Network series Foster's Home for Imaginary Friends, a role he reprised in the television film Destination: Imagination and the video game FusionFall.

His additional voice credits include Johnny Bravo, Batman Beyond, Fillmore!, Megas XLR, Four Eyes!, Shorty McShorts' Shorts, Avatar: The Last Airbender, The Mummy, and Stuart Little. He also voiced Peter Parker / Spider-Man in the video game Ultimate Spider-Man.

From 2015 to 2023, he portrayed Johnny Atkins in the sitcom The Goldbergs.

== Filmography ==
=== Film ===
Year	Title	Role	Notes
2002	Black Mask 2: City of Masks	Raymond	
2002	National Lampoon's Van Wilder	Little Kid	
2003	Full-Court Miracle	Big Ben Swartz	
2004	13 Going on 30	Young Matt Flamhaff	
2004	Surviving Christmas	Older brother	
2005	The Toy Warrior	Additional voices	
2006	Grilled	Jeremy Goldbluth	Direct-to-DVD
2007	Remember the Daze	Mod	Film formerly known as The Beautiful Ordinary
2008	Destination: Imagination	Mac (voice)	Television film
2009	The First Time	Nick	
2010	High School	Travis Breaux	
2012	I Brake for Gringos	Blake	
2014	Field of Lost Shoes	Benjamin "Duck" Colonna	
2016	Sundown	Blake	
2016	Friend Request	Gustavo	

=== Television ===
Year	Title	Role	Notes
1995–1998	All My Children	James Martin	16 episodes
1999	Snowden's Christmas	Additional voices	
2000–2002	Titus	Young Tommy	7 episodes
2001	Batman Beyond	Miguel Diaz (voice)	Episode: "Unmasked"
2002	Help, I'm a Boy!	Freddie (voice)	English dub
2002	The Zeta Project	Young Zee (voice)	Episode: "The River Rising"
2003	Lizzie McGuire	Adam Burton	Episode: "Dear Lizzie"
2003–2004	Rocket Power	Sam "The Squid" Dullard (voice)	Season 4
2003	Full-Court Miracle	Big Ben Swartz	
2003	Without a Trace	Nicholas Lovitt	Episode: "Copycat"
2003	The Mummy	Amar (voice)	Episode: "Time Before Time"
2003	Stuart Little	Zack (voice)	Episode: "Skateboard Dogz"
2003–2004	Fillmore!	Timmy, Ham, Linwood (voice)	3 episodes
2003	K10C: Kids' Ten Commandments	Seth (voice)	
2004	Johnny Bravo	Jimmy (voice)	Episode: "Double Vision"
2004	Megas XLR	Little Tommy (voice)	Episode: "DMV: Department of Megas Violations"
2004–2009	Foster's Home for Imaginary Friends	Mac (voice)	Main role
2005	NYPD Blue	Paul Corbelli (voice)	Episode: "Seargeant Sipowicz' Lonely Hearts Club Band"
2006	Four Eyes!	Rolland (voice)	
2006	The 4400	Boyd Gelder	3 episodes
2006	Standoff	Michael French	Episode: "Peer Group"
2007	Shorty McShorts' Shorts	Shapiro (voice)	Episode: "Troy Ride"
2007	Avatar: The Last Airbender	Young Firelord Sozin (voice)	Episode: "The Avatar and the Fire Lord"
2007	Monk	Ridley	Episode: "Mr. Monk and the Buried Treasure"
2004	Still Standing	Chris	Episode: "Still Fast"
2010	Ghost Whisperer	Henry Alston	Episode: "Blood Money"
2010	In Plain Sight	Nicky McCabe, Porter	Episode: "Father Gone West"
2013	NCIS	Petty Officer Third Class Evan Lowry	Episode: "Double Blind"
2014	Bones	Emory Stewart	Episode: "The Puzzler In the Pit"
2015–2023	The Goldbergs	Johnny Atkins	Recurring role
2019–2020	Schooled	Johnny Atkins	Recurring role
2021	The Rookie	Mr. Moore	Episode: "In Justice"

=== Video games ===
Year	Title	Role	Notes
2005	Ultimate Spider-Man	Peter Parker / Spider-Man	
2006	Kingdom Hearts II	Pence	
2006	Spider-Man: Battle for New York	Peter Parker / Spider-Man	Reused audio
2007	Foster's Home for Imaginary Friends: Imagination Invaders	Mac	
2007	Kingdom Hearts II Final Mix	Pence	Archival footage
2007	Spider-Man 3	Peter Parker / Spider-Man	Reused audio
2009	FusionFall	Mac	
2014	Kingdom Hearts HD 2.5 Remix	Pence	Archival footage
