= Anne Tremko =

American actress (born 1968)

- Born: Anne Marie Tremko; February 28, 1968 (age 58); Chicago, Illinois, U.S.
- Education: University of Illinois Urbana-Champaign
- Occupation: Actress
- Years active: 1993–2003

Anne Marie Tremko (born February 28, 1968) is an American actress perhaps best known for her role as Leslie Burke on Saved by the Bell: The College Years.

== Early life and education ==
Born in Chicago, Illinois, Tremko aspired to become an actress from the age of six, eventually studying at the University of Illinois Urbana-Champaign and performing on stage in theatre plays. In 1993 she moved to Los Angeles to begin her career.

== Career ==
Tremko's screen debut was a part in an episode of the television series The Adventures of Brisco County, Jr. as Amanda Wickwire, after which she was cast as Leslie Burke in Saved by the Bell: The College Years from 1993 to 1994.

In 1997 Tremko played a supporting role as the friend of Annabeth Gish's character Euphemia Ashby, portraying Matilda Lockhart, who is captured and tortured by Comanches in the CBS television miniseries True Women.

== Filmography ==
Anne Tremko film and television credits
Year	Title	Role	Notes	Ref.
1993	The Adventures of Brisco County, Jr.	Amanda Wickwire	1 episode	
1993–1994	Saved by the Bell: The College Years	Leslie Burke	19 episodes	
1995	My Antonia	Lena Lingard	Television film	
1995	The Computer Wore Tennis Shoes	Sarah Matthews	Television film	
1995	Wings	Jessica	Episode: "Boys Just Wanna Have Fun"	
1995	Sisters	Melissa Sorenson	Episode: "A Perfectly Reasonable Explanation"	
1996	Malibu Shores	Megan	2 episodes	
1997	Uncle Sam	Louise Harper	Direct-to-video film	
1997	The Member of the Wedding	Janice	Television film	
1997	True Women	Matilda Lockhart	Television miniseries	
1998	Nick Freno: Licensed Teacher	Thea	1 episode	
1998	Chicago Hope	Laura Turner	1 episode	
1998	L.A. Doctors	Sally Crowell	1 episode	
2002	The District	Mrs. Howell	1 episode	
2003	Judging Amy	Susan Ordonez	1 episode	
