= Richard T. Jones =

American actor (born 1972)

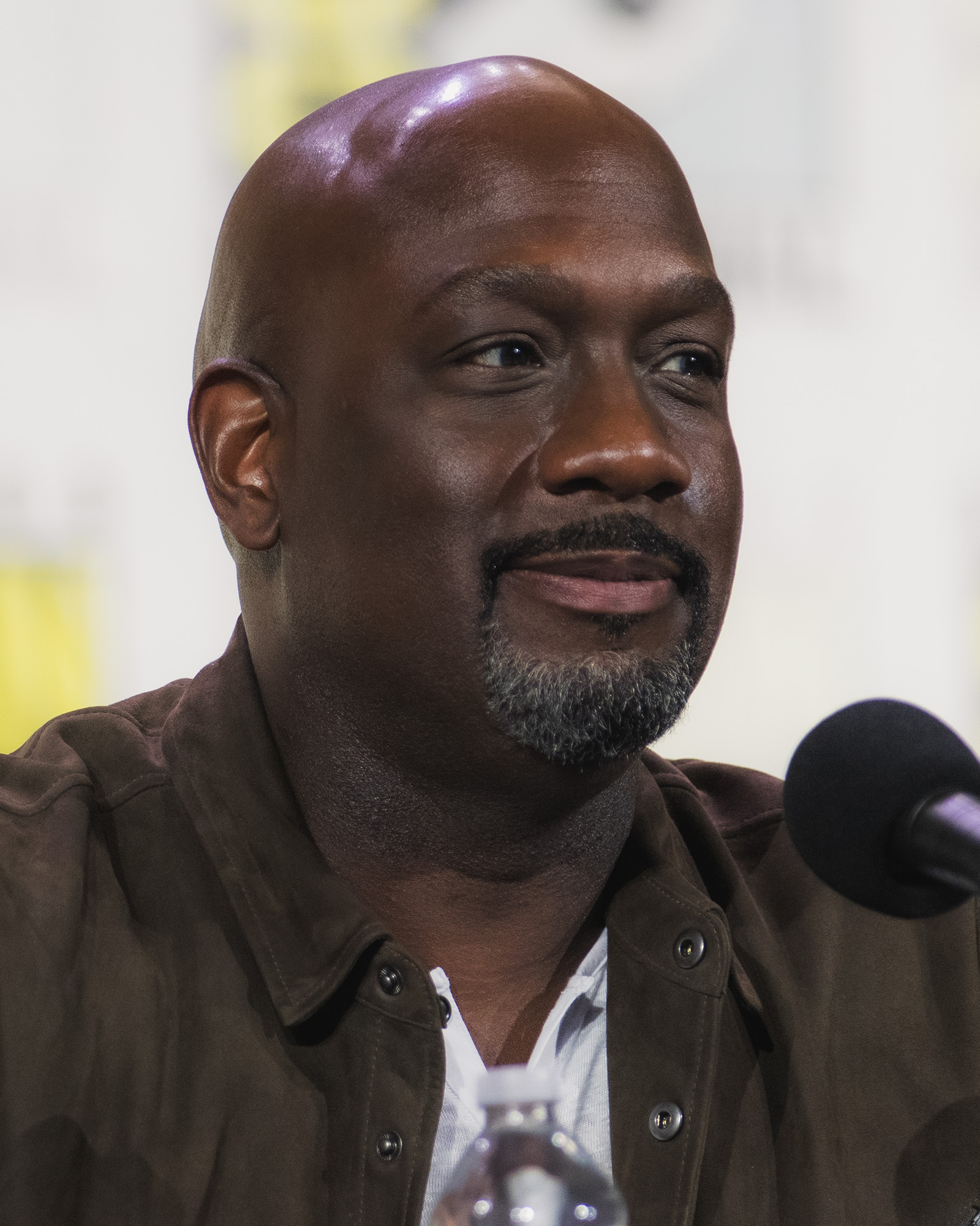
- Jones in 2026
- Born: Richard Timothy Jones; January 16, 1972 (age 54); Kobe, Japan
- Education: Tuskegee University
- Occupation: Actor
- Years active: 1992–present
- Spouse: Nancy Robinson (m. 1996; div. 2021) Kristy Horiuchi (m. 2023)
- Children: 3

Richard Timothy Jones (born January 16, 1972) is an American actor. He has worked in film and television since the early 1990s. His television roles include Ally McBeal (1997), Judging Amy (1999–2005), CSI: Miami (2006), Girlfriends (2007), Grey's Anatomy (2010), Hawaii Five-0 (2011–2014), Narcos (2015), and Criminal Minds (2017). Since 2018, he has played Police Lieutenant Wade Grey on the ABC police drama The Rookie.

His film roles include portrayals of Lamont Carr in Disney's Full Court Miracle (2003), Laveinio "Slim" Hightower in Rick Famuyiwa's coming-of-age film The Wood (1999), Mike in Tyler Perry's dramatic films Why Did I Get Married? (2007) and Why Did I Get Married Too? (2010), and Captain Russell Hampton in the Hollywood blockbuster Godzilla (2014).

== Early life ==
Jones was born in Kobe, Japan, to African-American parents and grew up in Carson, California. He is the son of Lorene, a computer analyst, and Clarence Jones, a professional baseball player who at the time of Richard's birth was playing for the Nankai Hawks in Osaka. He has an older brother, Clarence Jones Jr., who works as a high school basketball coach. They returned to North America after Clarence's retirement following the 1978 season. His parents later divorced. Jones attended Bishop Montgomery High School in Torrance, California, then graduated from Tuskegee University.

== Career ==
Since the early 1990s, Jones has worked in both film and television productions.

His first television role was in a 1993 episode of the series California Dreams. That same year, he appeared as Ike Turner Jr. in What's Love Got to Do with It. From 1999 to 2005, he starred as Bruce Calvin van Exel in the CBS legal drama series Judging Amy.

Over the next two decades, Jones starred or guest-starred in high-profile television series such as Ally McBeal (1997), CSI: Miami (2006), Girlfriends (2007), Grey's Anatomy (2010), Hawaii Five-0 (2011–2014), Narcos (2015), and Criminal Minds (2017).

His film roles include portrayals of Lamont Carr in the Disney film Full Court Miracle (2003), Laveinio "Slim" Hightower in Rick Famuyiwa's coming-of-age film The Wood (1999), and Mike in Tyler Perry's dramatic films Why Did I Get Married? (2007) and Why Did I Get Married Too? (2010), and Captain Russell Hampton in the Hollywood blockbuster Godzilla (2014).

From 2017 to 2018, Jones played Detective Tommy Cavanaugh in the CBS drama series Wisdom of the Crowd.

Since February 2018, Jones has played the role of Lieutenant and Former Watch Commander Wade Grey in the ABC police procedural drama series The Rookie with Nathan Fillion.

== Personal life ==
Jones is a Christian. From 1996 to 2021, he was married to Nancy Robinson, with whom he has three children. Jones married his second wife, Kristy “Kris” Horiuchi, in 2023.

== Filmography ==
=== Film ===
Year	Title	Role	Notes
1993	What's Love Got to Do with It	Ike Turner Jr.	
1994	M.A.N.T.I.S.	Gangbanger #2	TV movie
1994	Renaissance Man	Corporal Jackson Leroy	
1994	Helicopter	Malik	Short
1995	Jury Duty	Nathan	
1996	Black Rose of Harlem	Cateye	
1996	The Trigger Effect	Raymond	
1996	Johns	Mr. Popper	
1997	Hollywood Confidential	Dexter	TV movie
1997	Event Horizon	Cooper	
1997	Kiss the Girls	Seth Samuel	
1998	Goodbye Lover	Detective One	
1999	Incognito	Jake Hunter	TV movie
1999	The Wood	Laveinio "Slim" Hightower	
1999	Voices of Glory	George E. Stephens	Short
2000	Auggie Rose	Officer Decker	
2000	Lockdown	Avery Montgomery	
2002	Book of Love	Ben Strong	
2002	G	Summer G	
2002	Moonlight Mile	Ty	
2002	Phone Booth	Sergeant Jonah Cole	
2002	Second String	Gerry Fullerton	TV movie
2003	Full-Court Miracle	Lamont Carr	TV movie
2004	Twisted	Wilson Jefferson	
2004	Soul Plane	False Denzel	
2004	Breach	Alan McCabe	Short
2004	Collateral	Traffic Cop #1	
2004	Paradise	Senator Michael Linney	TV movie
2004	Finding Neo	Morphin'Us	Short
2005	Guess Who	Man on Cellphone	
2005	Riding the Bus with My Sister	Jesse	TV movie
2006	The Package	Vance aka Bruce	Short
2006	Time Bomb	Douglas Campbell	TV movie
2006	Traci Townsend	Travis	
2006	Cutting Room	Steve	
2007	Game of Life	Mark	
2007	Why Did I Get Married?	Mike	
2008	Vantage Point	Holden	
2008	15 Minutes of Fame	Bradley Wainwright	
2010	Why Did I Get Married Too?	Mike	
2010	Caught in the Crossfire	Captain Emmett	
2010	Boston's Finest	Lt. Gerald Jaglom	TV movie
2011	King of the Underground	Himself	
2011	Super 8	Overmyer	
2012	Note to Self	Curtis Sr.	
2012	The Great Divide	Jeff	
2012	Atlas Shrugged II: The Strike	Eddie Willers	TV movie
2013	200 Years	Willie	Short
2013	Life of a King	Perry	
2013	The Last Letter	Mr. Tines	
2014	Godzilla	Captain Russell Hampton	
2014	Hear No Evil	Samuel Carson	
2014	Cru	Richard 'Rich' Hughes	
2014	Lyfe's Journey	Pastor Taylor	TV movie
2015	Forgiveness	Pastor Joseph Jenkins	
2015	Hot Pursuit	Detective Jackson	
2015	Concussion	Andre Waters	
2016	Cursed Angel	Luther	TV movie
2016	Restored Me	Coach Maurice Durrell	
2017	Secrets of Deception	Detective Jones	
2017	CHiPs	Parish	
2017	Another You	Professor Thompson	
2017	A Question of Faith	David Newman	
2018	The Public	Chief Edwards	
2018	Edge of the World	Chaplain Jacobs	
2018	Sanitatum	Shelton Scott	
2019	Round of Your Life	Coach Wilson	
2023	The Hard Hit	Director Ross	
2025	Aftershock: The Nicole P Bell Story	Anthony Ricco	Post-production

=== Television ===
Year	Title	Role	Notes
1992	Renegade	Slick	Episode: "Second Chance"
1993	California Dreams	'Big Bad' Bo	Episode: "High Plains Dreamer"
1994	NYPD Blue	Willy	Episode: "Serge the Concierge"
1994	In the Heat of the Night	Donald 'Donnie' Muir	Episode: "Who Was Geli Bendl?"
1995	Sweet Justice	Tyrin	Recurring Cast
1995	Courthouse	Quentin "Q" Thomas	Episode: "Fair-Weathered Friends"
1996	Dangerous Minds	Kimboley	Episode: "Pilot"
1997–1998	Brooklyn South	Officer Clement Johnson	Main Cast
1998	Ally McBeal	Matt Griffin	Recurring Cast: Season 2
1999–2005	Judging Amy	Bruce Calvin van Exel	Main Cast
2001	Hollywood Squares	Himself	Recurring Guest
2005	Sex, Love & Secrets	Dr. Barnaby Walker	Recurring Cast
2006	CSI: Miami	Chris Kaiser	Episode: "Collision"
2006–2007	Girlfriends	Aaron Waters	Recurring Cast: Season 7–8
2007	Blvd. of Broken Dreams	Himself	Episode: "Chris Penn/Tara McMullen"
2007	Las Vegas	Keith Mannix	Episode: "The Chicken Is Making My Back Hurt"
2007	Dirt	Bulldog	Episode: "Come Together"
2008	Numb3rs	Blanchard	Episode: "Pay to Play"
2008–2009	Terminator: The Sarah Connor Chronicles	James Ellison	Main Cast
2010	Bones	Mr. White	Episode: "The Proof in the Pudding"
2010	Grey's Anatomy	Colonel Dan Mooney	Episode: "Suicide Is Painless"
2011–2013	Hawaii Five-0	Governor Samuel "Sam" Denning	Recurring Cast: Season 2–3, Guest: Season 4
2012–2013	Nikita	Commander Evan Danforth	Recurring Cast: Season 3
2013	Revolution	Ken Dawson	Recurring Cast: Season 2
2014	Satisfaction	Carl	Episode: "...Through Revelation"
2014	Law & Order: Special Victims Unit	Judge Oscar Briggs	Episode: "Pornstar's Requiem"
2015	NCIS: New Orleans	Security Team Leader Ryan Anson	Episode: "Careful What You Wish For"
2015	Extant	JD's Friend	Recurring Cast: Season 2
2015	American Horror Story: Hotel	Detective Andrew Hahn	Recurring Cast
2015–2016	Narcos	CIA Officer	Recurring Cast: Season 1, Guest: Season 2
2016	Lucifer	Joe Hanson	Episode: "The Would-Be Prince of Darkness"
2017	Criminal Minds	Officer Lionel Wilkins	Recurring Cast: Season 12
2017	Daytime Divas	Ben Branson	Episode: "We Are Family"
2017–2018	Teachers	Frank Humphrey	Recurring Cast: Season 2
2017–2018	Wisdom of the Crowd	Detective Tommy Cavanaugh	Main Cast
2017–2018	Santa Clarita Diet	Rick	Recurring Cast: Season 1–2
2018–present	The Rookie	Police Sergeant/Lieutenant Wade Grey	Main Cast
2020	Home Town	Himself	Episode: "Los Angeles to Laurel"
2021	A Black Lady Sketch Show	Bubba	Episode: "Sister, May I Call You Oshun?"
2022	The Rookie: Feds	Police Sergeant II Wade Grey	Episode: "Countdown"
