= Full-Court Miracle =

- Film poster
- Written by: Joel Silverman
- Directed by: Stuart Gillard
- Starring: Alex D. Linz; Richard T. Jones
- Theme music composer: Christopher Brady
- Original language: English

Production
- Producer: Jacqueline George
- Cinematography: Thomas Burstyn
- Editor: Anthony Redman
- Running time: 90 minutes
- Production company: Daniel L. Paulson Productions

Original release
- Network: Disney Channel
- Release: November 21, 2003

Full-Court Miracle is a 2003 American Hanukkah sports drama film released as a Disney Channel Original Movie. It premiered on November 21, 2003. Inspired by the true story of University of Virginia Cavaliers basketball star Lamont Carr, the film centers on a group of young Jewish basketball players who search for a coach to help them out of a slump during the Hanukkah season. It was filmed in Toronto.

== Plot ==
Alex "Schlots" Schlotsky (Alex D. Linz) is a 14-year-old freshman at Philadelphia Hebrew Academy, where he and his friends are on the school's struggling basketball team, the Lions. The Lions dream of winning the Liberty Tournament and defeating their school's rivals, the Warriors, but the basketball team doesn't have a good coach. Schlots and his friends are determined to find their own Judah Macabee to coach their team. During one day of practice at a local park, Schlots finds the man he believes is the right coach for the basketball team: Lamont Carr (Richard T. Jones), a college basketball star whose knee injury prevented him from getting into the NBA. There are many hurdles Schlots and Lamont must overcome over the course of the movie: Lamont is homeless after leaving his wife and son in Virginia with the hopes of being signed by the Philadelphia 76ers; Schlots must convince Lamont that coaching his ragtag group is worth his time, energy, and the meager amount of money the boys can pay him. Schlots also must balance his own desires with those of his mother, who wishes for him to become a doctor and attend a medical shadowing program. Also, among the challenges they must face is the school's principal, Mrs. Klein, who tries to see if Lamont is safe to be with the players.

During the boys' first days of practice under Lamont's coaching, they become exhausted and frustrated with his coaching style, but intervention by Schlots inspires Lamont to help the team love the game of basketball. One day, Mrs. Klein tries to inconspicuously tail Lamont to follow Lamont when he drives off in his van after practice. Aware of both this and Lamont's homelessness, Schlots tells him to go to a modern apartment complex where his dad is trying to get a tenant for a room he owns.

When Schlots opens the door for Lamont, Mrs. Klein is outside the apartment complex. Lamont and Mr. Schlotsky come to an agreement: Lamont can live in the apartment for free Mr. Schlotsky can find a tenant. Later, when the Lions players are anticipating the big Liberty Tournament, Lamont tells the team that he has received an offer for a 10-day contract from the Philadelphia 76ers and he is going to accept it. This means the Lions must try to win the tournament without their coach. The Lions prove successful, winning every game in the tournament.

On the day of the final game, Schlots finally confronts his mother and gets her to appreciate his love for basketball. That night, as the Liberty Tournament takes place, a thunderstorm begins to occur. Schlots' mother decides to support her son, but decides to find Lamont first.

The storm eventually knocks out the power in the school's gymnasium. After the school mobilizes an emergency generator for the remainder of the game, the Lions and the Warriors agree to continue the game with the understanding that whenever the fuel in the generator runs out, the game will end and the team with the most points at that time will win. The Warriors devise a plan to make sure it is them: when they are ahead in the game and it becomes clear that the fuel in the generator is moments away from running out, the Warriors will call a timeout that will last until the remaining fuel in the generator is exhausted. The Lions are outraged and discouraged until Lamont appears in the gym and encourages them to not lose faith. The power then once again goes out in the gym – and the Warriors celebrate what they believe is their victory – until the generator restarts despite being out of gas, and the power comes back on. The final moments of the game consist of the Lions catching up to the Warriors, and with the final seconds on the clock ticking down, Schlots passes the ball instead of trying to take the final shot himself, per his usual self, leading to the Lions scoring the winning basket.

The entire school celebrates, and Lamont's wife and son enter the gym and announce plans to stay with Lamont, who reveals to the Lions that he plans to become their full-time coach. The final scene of Schlots and Lamont's family playing basketball as Rabbi Lewis' story of Hanukkah and how it relates to the basketball game plays over the scene.

== Cast ==
- Alex D. Linz as Alex "Schlots" Schlotsky
- Richard T. Jones as Lamont Carr
- R. H. Thomson as Rabbi Lewis
- Jase Blankfort as “Stick” Goldstein
- Sean Marquette as Ben "Big Ben" Swartz
- Erik Knudsen as T. J. Murphy
- David Sazant as "Joker" Levy
- Sheila McCarthy as Mrs. Klein
- Linda Kash as Cynthia Schlotsky
- Jason Blicker as Marshall Schlotsky
- Cassie Steele as Julie
- Jack Manchester as Tyler
- Ron Gabriel as Coach Simowitz
- Stan Coles as Larry
- Sean Loucks as Bob, The Referee
- Gina Kash as Sarah Lewis
- Dan Willmott as Tow Truck Driver
- Elle Downes as Charmaine
- Jerome Williams as Himself

== Reception ==
Laura Fries of Variety was critical of the film, writing that director Stuart Gillard "misses a prime opportunity to present a poignant and entertaining multicultural alternative to the usual holiday viewing". She wrote that Gillard "lays the groundwork for a meaningful drama but inconsistently intersperses fantasy elements and slapstick comedy". Joe Eskenazi of JWeekly found the adult characters one-dimensional but applauded the younger actors. He called the film "cheesy" but nevertheless "sort of liked it".

== See also ==
- List of basketball films
