= Blood Brothers: Malcolm X & Muhammad Ali =

- Promotional poster
- Directed by: Marcus A. Clarke
- Based on: Blood Brothers: The Fatal Friendship Between Muhammad Ali and Malcolm X by: Randy Roberts; Johnny Smith
- Produced by: Kenya Barris; Ayanna Hart; Jason Perez
- Starring: Muhammad Ali; Malcolm X
- Cinematography: Justin Janowitz
- Edited by: Paul Carruthers; Jeremy Siefer
- Music by: Thomas Brenneck
- Production company: Khalabo Ink Society
- Distributed by: Netflix
- Release date: September 9, 2021
- Running time: 95 minutes
- Country: United States
- Language: English

Blood Brothers: Malcolm X & Muhammad Ali is a 2021 American documentary film made for Netflix and directed by Marcus A. Clarke. The film is based on the book Blood Brothers: The Fatal Friendship Between Muhammad Ali and Malcolm X by Randy Roberts and Johnny Smith. It tells the story of the friendship and deterioration thereof between American boxer Muhammad Ali and human rights activist Malcolm X, which is depicted through archival footage and interviews with friends of the two men. It was released on September 9, 2021.
