= My Name Is Joe (album) =

2000 album by Joe

Studio album by Joe
- Released: April 18, 2000
- Genre: R&B
- Length: 58:45
- Label: Jive
- Producers: Joe; Kevin "She'kspere" Briggs; Allen "Allstar" Gordon; Roy "Royalty" Hamilton; Steve "Stone" Huff; Edwin "Tony" Nicholas; Teddy Riley; Jon-John Robinson; Tim & Bob; Joshua P. Thompson

Joe chronology
All That I Am (1997)	My Name Is Joe (2000)	Better Days (2001)

Singles from My Name Is Joe
- 1. "I Wanna Know" Released: November 7, 1999; 2. "Treat Her Like a Lady" Released: May 22, 2000; 3. "Stutter" Released: January 2, 2001

My Name Is Joe is the third studio album by American R&B singer Joe, released on April 18, 2000, on Jive Records. Production was handled by Joe and several other record producers including Allen "Allstar" Gordon, Teddy Riley and Tim & Bob. Beforehand, Joe released All That I Am (1997), which was his most successful album prior to the release of My Name Is Joe. Upon its release, My Name Is Joe received favorable reviews from critics, with most appreciating the love feel of the album.

The album peaked at number 2 on the US Billboard 200 and topped the US R&B/Hip-Hop Albums chart. It charted internationally as well, peaking within the top 10 in Netherlands and Canada as well as appearing in the Australia, France, Sweden, and the UK. My Name Is Joe contained three singles—"I Wanna Know", "Treat Her Like a Lady", and "Stutter"—the first and last of which appeared within the top five of the US Billboard Hot 100. The album has been certified triple-platinum by the Recording Industry Association of America (RIAA), certified platinum by Music Canada, and certified silver by the Syndicat National de l'Édition Phonographique (SNEP).

== Critical reception ==
Professional ratings
Review scores
Source	Rating
AllMusic	4/5 stars
Entertainment Weekly	C−
Los Angeles Times	3/4 stars
MTV Asia	8/10
USA Today	3/4 stars

AllMusic editor Stephen Thomas Erlewine rated the album four out of five stars and noted that "there may not be much variety or many remarkable songs on the record [...] but that doesn't matter because this is essentially a mood record, and that mood is love. And it's not a bad romantic mood-setter, either, since Joe is an appealing vocalist, the production is lush without being syrupy, and the songs are all fairly strong, even if only a handful are exceptional." Connie Johnson, writing for Los Angeles Times, wrote: "Joe is all about old-fashioned romance, be it on the tender "I Wanna Know" or the heart-tugging "I Believe in You," on which he shares the microphone with labelmates *NSYNC. If it’s mood-enhancing background music you seek, Joe’s your man."

Billboard critic Michael Paoletta noted that "with production guidance from the one-named singer himself, Tim & Bob, Teddy Riley, She'kspere, and others, Joe smoothly steers from sweet submission to love and honor [...] Joe plants a firmer grip on R&B's passionate romance torch." Matt Diehl from Entertainment Weekly found that Joe's "horny histrionics lack authentic bump or grind. A pleasant enough singer with a high, flowery voice, Joe comes off like Babyface meets Al B. Sure! [...] His come-ons might go over better if supported by something other than boilerplate pop-soul production. Joe’s best when his wispy vocals are contrasted." Meghan Haynes from Vibe felt that "although My Name Is Joe is undoubtedly a satisfying album [...] listeners will wish Joe delivered more substantial soul and less shallow, uninspired songs." Reeta Sidhu from MTV Asia felt that My Name Is Joe was a sexy, smooth R&B collection perfect for romance. She gave the album a 8/10 rating.

== Commercial performance ==
My Name Is Joe debuted at number two on the US Billboard 200 behind label mates NSYNC's No Strings Attached, selling 286,000 copies in its first week. This marked Joe's first top-ten album in the United States. The album was certified gold by the Recording Industry Association of America (RIAA) on May 18, 2000 and reached triple platinum status on July 25, 2001. In 2007, Billboard reported that the My Name Is Joe had sold 2.6 million in the United States, according to Nielsen SoundScan.

In Canada, the album reached number six on RPM's the Top CDs/Albums chart. By August 2000, it had sold 45,000 copies. On February 2, 2001, My Name Is Joe was certified platinum by Music Canada for shipments in excess of 100,000 copies. Elsewhere, it the top ten in the Netherlands and on the UK R&B Albums chart and was certified gold on both France and the United Kingdom.

== Track listing ==
My Name Is Joe track listing
No.	Title	Writer(s)	Producer(s)	Length
1.	"Intro (My Name Is Joe)"	Joe Thomas; Joshua P. Thompson; Quincy Patrick	Joe; Thompson	0:46
2.	"Somebody Gotta Be on Top"	Thomas; Thompson; Calvin Gaines; Ricky Slaughter	Joe; Thompson	4:11
3.	"Stutter"	Roy "Royalty" Hamilton; Ernest E. Dixon	Teddy Riley; Hamilton^{[a]}	3:52
4.	"Table for Two"	Thomas; Joylon Skinner; Allen Gordon	Gordon; Campbell^{[a]}	5:29
5.	"I Wanna Know"	Thomas; Skinner; Michele Williams	Joe; Tony Nicholas; Timmy Allen^{[a]}	4:56
6.	"Treat Her Like a Lady"	Steve "Stone" Huff; Isaac Hayes	Huff	4:17
7.	"Get Crunk Tonight"	Kandi Burruss; Bernard Edwards, Jr.; Jason Weaver	Kevin "She'kspere" Briggs; Focus^{[b]}	4:17
8.	"5 6 3 (Joe)"	Thomas; Thompson	Thomas; Thompson	4:05
9.	"Peep Show"	Thomas; Skinner; Gordon	Gordon; Campbell^{[a]}	4:27
10.	"One Life Stand"	Thomas; Thompson; David Conley	Thomas; Thompson	4:39
11.	"Black Hawk"	Thomas; Skinner; Jon-John Robinson	J. Robinson	4:13
12.	"I Believe in You" (duet with *NSYNC)	Thomas; Skinner; Gordon	Gordon	4:57
13.	"So Beautiful"	Thomas; Tim Kelley; Bob Robinson	Tim & Bob	4:26
14.	"Thank God I Found You (Make It Last Remix)" (featuring Mariah Carey & Nas)	Mariah Carey; James Harris III; Terry Lewis; Riley; Keith Sweat	Jimmy Jam & Terry Lewis; Carey^{[d]}; Duro^{[d]}; Clue^{[d]}	4:11

European bonus tracks
No.	Title	Writer(s)	Producer(s)	Length
15.	"Soon As I Get Paid"	Thomas; Thompson; Gordon	Gordon	3:13
16.	"I'm Missing You"	Thomas; Kelley; B. Robinson	Tim & Bob	4:25
17.	"No One Else Comes Close"	Thomas; Gary Baker; Wayne Perry	Joe; Nicholas; Tie Williams^{[c]}	3:51

UK special edition bonus track
No.	Title	Writer(s)	Producer(s)	Length
18.	"Stutter (Double Take Remix)" (featuring Mystikal)	Hamilton; Dixon; Trevant Hardson; Emandu Wilcox; Romye Robinson; Derrick Stewart; Steve Boone; John Sebastian; Mark Sebastian	Riley; Hamilton^{[a]}; Gordon^{[d]}	3:33

Notes

- ^{^[a]} signifies additional producer(s)
- ^{^[b]} signifies co-producer(s)
- ^{^[c]} signifies associate producer(s)
- ^{^[d]} signifies remix producer(s)
- On digital versions of the album, "Stutter (Double Take Remix)" replaces "Black Hawk" as track 11.

Sample credits

- "Treat Her Like a Lady" contains a portion of "Bumpy's Lament" as written by Isaac Hayes.
- "Thank God I Found You (Make It Last Remix)" contains interpolations from "Make It Last Forever" as written by Keith Sweat and Teddy Riley.
- "Stutter (Double Take Remix)" contains a sample from "Passin' Me By" as performed by The Pharcyde.

== Personnel ==
Credits for My Name Is Joe adapted from Allmusic.

- Sanford Allen – concert master
- Timmy Allen – keyboards, producer, programming
- Tim Kelley – keyboards, drum programming, guitar, engineer, mixing
- James Biondolillo – string arrangements
- Andy Blakelock – engineer
- Joel Campbell – producer
- Dana Jon Chappelle – editing, engineer
- Earl Cohen – engineer
- Steve Cooper – assistant engineer
- Steve Croom – recording engineer
- Kevin "KD" Davis – mixing
- Andrew Felluss – assistant engineer
- John Fundi – engineer
- Brian Garten – assistant engineer, editing, engineer
- Stephen George – mixing
- Mark "Exit" Goodchild – mixing assistant
- Allen Gordon, Jr. – producer
- Onaje Allan Gumbs – Fender Rhodes
- Mick Guzauski – mixing
- Roy "Royalty" Hamilton – programming
- Jean-Marie Horvat – mixing
- Steve Huff – producer
- Ken "Duro" Ifill – remix producer

- Joe – keyboards, producer, programming, vocals, background vocals
- Bashiri Johnson – percussion
- Andrew Lyn – mixing assistant
- Manny Marroquin – mixing
- George Meyers – engineer, mixing
- Nick Morac – acoustic guitar
- Edwin "Tony" Nicholas – producer
- Paul Oliviera – engineer
- Hendrik Ostrau – assistant engineer
- Angelo Quaglia – engineer
- Teddy Riley – mixing, producer, programming
- Bob Robinson – producer
- Dave Russell – assistant engineer
- Eric Schlotzer – engineer
- Ron A. Shaffer – mixing
- Brian Smith – engineer, mixing
- Shane Stoneback – engineer
- Chris Trevett – mixing
- Jeff Vereb – engineer
- Frantz Verna – engineer
- Ted Wohlsen – engineer
- John Wydrycs – assistant engineer
- Jon-John Robinson – producer, drum programming, keyboards

== Charts ==
=== Weekly charts ===
Weekly chart performance for My Name Is Joe
Chart (2000)	Peak position
Australian Albums (ARIA)	43
Canada Top CDs/Albums (RPM)	6
Canadian R&B Albums (Nielsen SoundScan)	8
Dutch Albums (Album Top 100)	7
French Albums (SNEP)	21
German Albums (Offizielle Top 100)	58
Swedish Albums (Sverigetopplistan)	58
UK Albums (Official Charts)	46
UK R&B Albums (Official Charts)	7
US Billboard 200	2
US Top R&B/Hip-Hop Albums (Billboard)	1

=== Year-end charts ===
Year-end chart performance for My Name Is Joe
Chart (2000)	Position
Canadian Albums (Nielsen SoundScan)	109
Dutch Albums (Album Top 100)	68
US Billboard 200	35
US Top R&B/Hip-Hop Albums (Billboard)	8

== Certifications ==
Certifications and sales for My Name Is Joe
Region	Certification	Certified units/sales
Canada (Music Canada)	Platinum	100,000^{^}
France (SNEP)	Gold	100,000^{*}
United Kingdom (BPI)	Gold	100,000^{*}
United States (RIAA)	3× Platinum	3,000,000^{^}
^{*} Sales figures based on certification alone.^{^} Shipments figures based on certification alone.

== See also ==
- List of number-one R&B albums of 2000 (U.S.)
