= The Wood =

1999 film by Rick Famuyiwa

- Theatrical release poster
- Directed by: Rick Famuyiwa
- Written by: Rick Famuyiwa; Todd Boyd
- Produced by: Albert Berger; David Gale; Douglas Curtis; Momita SenGupta; Ron Yerxa; Todd Boyd; Van Toffler
- Starring: Taye Diggs; Omar Epps; Richard T. Jones; Sean Nelson
- Cinematography: Steven Bernstein
- Edited by: John Carter
- Music by: Robert Hurst
- Production company: MTV Productions
- Distributed by: Paramount Pictures
- Release date: July 16, 1999
- Running time: 106 minutes
- Country: United States
- Language: English
- Budget: $6 million
- Box office: $25 million

The Wood is a 1999 American coming-of-age comedy drama film directed by Rick Famuyiwa in his feature directorial debut and starring Omar Epps, Richard T. Jones and Taye Diggs. It was written by Famuyiwa and Todd Boyd.

== Plot ==
Roland is getting married and is currently missing. Slim, who scoffs at the idea of marriage, is furious at Roland for disappearing. The story flashes back to Mike as a youth in the 1980s when he first encounters Roland and Slim, his first real crush on a girl named Alicia, and the three young men's misadventures as teenagers growing up in Inglewood, California (aka "the Wood").

Shy and awkward, Mike is quickly befriended by Slim and Roland. On a dare from Slim and Roland, Mike reluctantly grabs Alicia's butt, leading to a physical altercation with her older brother and Blood gang member, Stacey. While he is beaten up, Mike earns Stacey's private respect for having courage to fight back.

Meanwhile, in present day, Mike and Slim get a call from Tanya, Roland's ex, saying that Roland is at her house, extremely drunk. When they arrive, they argue with Roland for putting his relationship at risk, as the wedding is just hours away.

Flashing back to the 1980s, the boys are on their way to the first dance of the year, stopping at a convenience store that gets robbed by Stacey. Stacey recognizes the boys and offers them a ride to the dance. The group is nearly arrested after being pulled over for a broken tail light. Mike's quick thinking prevents one of the cops from finding Stacey's gun. They let them go when the cops respond to a call about the stick-up Stacey pulled earlier from him and his friend.

Impressed, Stacey begins a new friendship with Mike by apologizing for their prior run-in. However, he explains that he was protecting his sister and seeing how much Mike likes her, gives him advice on how to win her over. When they arrive at the dance, it is almost over, and Mike is able to secure a dance with Alicia and also get her number. Later, Mike and Alicia date for a time before breaking up and remaining friends.

In the present day, while reminiscing, Roland becomes sick and accidentally vomits on Slim and Mike. Now, the men only have an hour left before the wedding and they have to get cleaned up, so they take their clothes to the cleaners.

Mike, returning to their memories when they were juniors in high school, remembers them thinking about sex, ways to get it and making a lot of bets as to who has it first. Mike has a girlfriend and Alicia has a boyfriend. Despite both of them already being in a relationship with somebody else, one day Mike and Alicia walk to her house from the library talking about the homecoming dance.

They listen to "If This World Were Mine" on the radio, the song to which they had the first dance. Alicia and Mike begin getting intimate, but Alicia stops him and tells Mike to retrieve a condom from Stacey's room. Mike finds a condom in Stacey's room. Before leaving, he has to hide under his bed, so as not to get caught when Stacey and his girlfriend come home. After they leave, Mike goes back to Alicia's room and they have sex. Mike wins the bet, but he doesn't tell Roland and Slim out of respect for Alicia.

It is revealed in the present that after high school, Alicia and Mike went their separate ways with Alicia going to attend Columbia University in New York while Mike decided to stay home and attend The University of Southern California even though Roland reveals that Mike could have followed her as he did get accepted into New York University. The boys finally make it to the wedding and Roland apologizes to a furious Lisa for leaving her worried. Before the ceremony begins, Mike has a fond exchange with a now-grown Alicia while Roland and Lisa get married. Mike reminisces on the homecoming dance, declaring that he, Roland and Slim will be the boys from "the Wood".

== Cast ==
- Omar Epps as Michael "Mike" Tarver, who narrates how he and his friends grew up together in "The Wood".
  - Sean Nelson as young Mike, a newcomer from North Carolina who just moved to Inglewood at a new school. He became friends with Roland and Slim.
- Richard T. Jones as Laveinio "Slim" Hightower, he and Mike help Roland get back to the ceremony to get married.
  - Duane Finley as young Slim, raised up in "The Wood", best friends with Roland growing up and then meeting Mike. He was always asking for Roland to hook him up.
- Taye Diggs as Roland Blackmon, the groom who has second thoughts about getting married and is found drunk by his two best friends.
  - Trent Cameron as young Roland, a self-proclaimed ladies man who gets no play most of the time.
- Sanaa Lathan as Alicia, an old childhood friend that grew up and came back to see Mike.
  - Malinda Williams as young Alicia
- LisaRaye McCoy as Lisa, a bride getting ready to marry Roland, and gets upset about his disappearance.
- De'Aundre Bonds as Stacey, Alicia's big brother that takes up for her when she is younger. He's also a "Bloods" gang member. Stacey reappears in the film Dope.
- Antwon Tanner as "Boo", Stacey's friend and member of the "Bloods".
- Tamala Jones as Tanya, Roland's ex-girlfriend
- Jascha Washington as Mike's younger brother

== Reception ==
The film holds a 61% on Rotten Tomatoes based on 56 reviews, with the critical consensus: "A charming piece of work with believable characters." Metacritic, which uses a weighted average, assigned the film a score of 52 out of 100, based on 21 critics, indicating "mixed or average" reviews.

Reviewing for the Chicago Sun-Times in July 1999, Roger Ebert called it "a sweet, lighthearted comedy" and applauded Famuyiwa for capturing members of the cinematically marginalized African-American middle class. "The movie feels a little uncertain, as if it's moving from present to past under the demands of a screenplay rather than because it really feels that way", Ebert wrote in conclusion. "But the growing-up stuff is kind of wonderful."

=== Awards and nominations ===
2000 Black Reel Awards

- Best Actor (Theatrical)—Sean Nelson (nominated)
- Best Actress (Theatrical)—Malinda Williams (nominated)
- Best Director (Theatrical)—Rick Famuyiwa (nominated)
- Best Screenplay (Original or Adapted)—Rick Famuyiwa, Todd Boyd (nominated)

2000 NAACP Image Awards

- Outstanding Motion Picture (nominated)

2001 ASCAP Film and Television Music Awards

- Most Performed Songs from Motion Pictures—Joe, Jolyon Skinner: "I Wanna Know" (winner)

== Soundtrack ==
A soundtrack was released on July 13, 1999, by Jive Records featuring rap and R&B music. The soundtrack found great success, peaking at number 16 on the Billboard 200 and 2 on the Top R&B/Hip-Hop Albums. The album was certified gold by the RIAA on August 25, 1999.

== Television series ==
In August 2021, Showtime gave a pilot order to a television series adaptation of the film. The project was set to be produced by Paramount Television Studios, with Justin Hillian writing and Famuyiwa directing the pilot. In April 2023, Showtime announced the network would not be moving forward with the series.
