= Rick Famuyiwa =

American film and television director (born 1973)

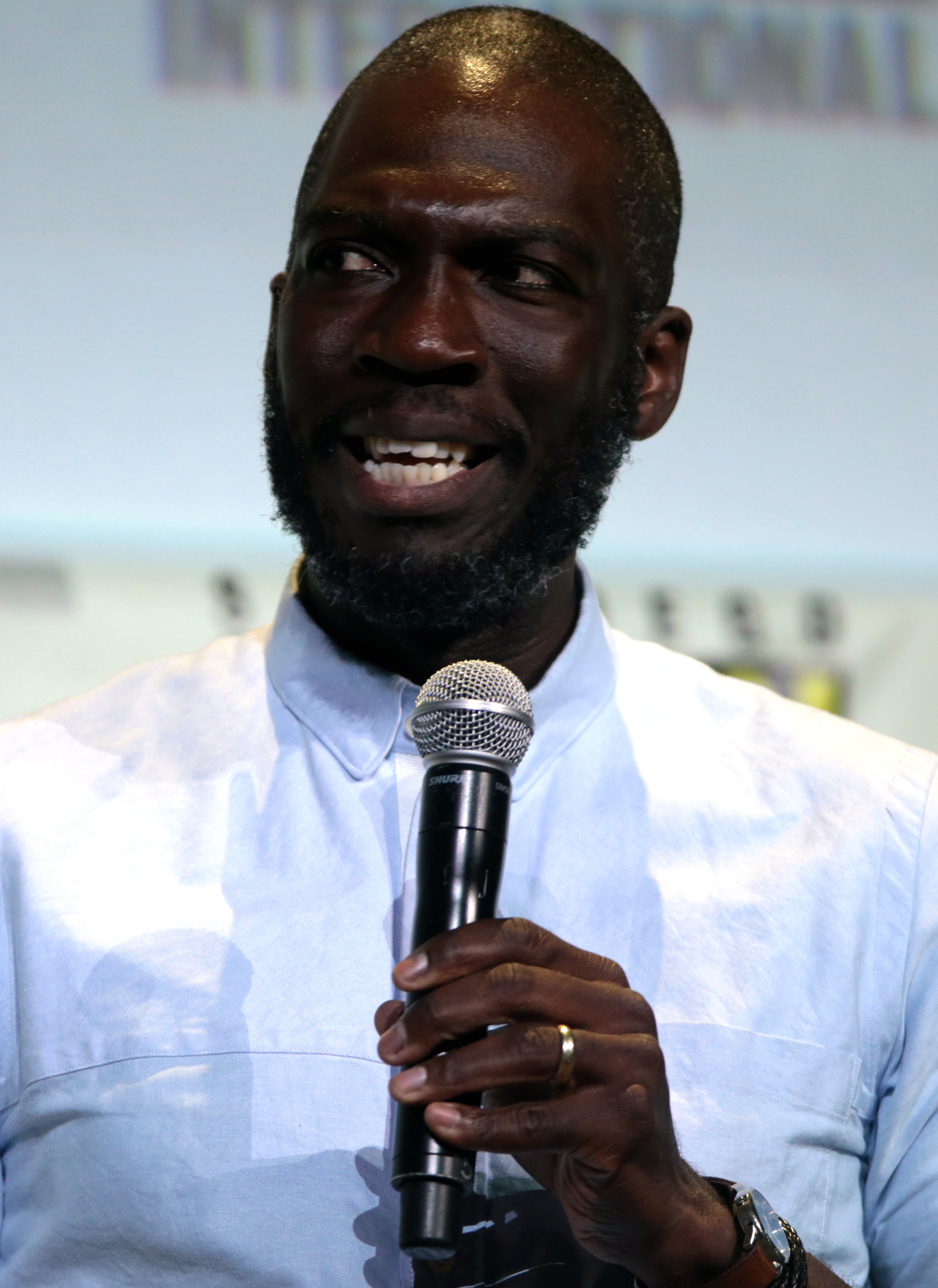
- Famuyiwa at the 2016 San Diego Comic-Con.
- Born: June 18, 1973 (age 53); Los Angeles, California
- Occupations: Director, producer, screenwriter
- Years active: 1999–present
- Spouse: Glenita Mosley (m. 1999)

Rick Famuyiwa (born June 18, 1973) is a Nigerian-American filmmaker and television director. He is best known for the films The Wood (1999), Brown Sugar (2002), and Dope (2015), as well as for his work on the television series The Mandalorian, for which he directed six episodes and served as an executive producer for the third season. His films have been nominated for or won multiple awards, including in 2008, when he received an NAACP Image Award for Outstanding Writing in a Motion Picture for the film Talk To Me (2007).

== Early life and education ==
Famuyiwa grew up near Los Angeles, California in Inglewood. The son of Nigerian immigrants, Famuyiwa is a second-generation American. Reflecting on his time in Inglewood, Famuyiwa recounts, "People come to L.A. and they expect to see a ghetto like the projects, but that's not the way it's set up. Inglewood, in particular, is the furthest thing from a ghetto. It's a middle-class community, but it's gotten a bad rap over the years...because of Grand Canyon and Pulp Fiction and other films."

After high school, Famuyiwa attended the University of Southern California (USC) and double-majored in cinematic arts film & television production and cinematic arts critical studies. During his time at the university, Famuyiwa worked intimately with film professor Todd Boyd, who would later help write and produce his first feature film. In 1996, prior to graduation, Famuyiwa created a 12-minute short film entitled Blacktop Lingo that garnered critical positive feedback and led to his invitation to the Sundance Filmmaker's Institute. In 1997, during his time at the Sundance Director's Lab, Famuyiwa put the finishing touches on The Wood, his first feature film.

In 1999, Famuyiwa married Glenita Mosley whom he met at the University of Southern California.

== Career ==
=== The Wood (1999) ===
Famuyiwa's first feature film, The Wood is a semi-autobiographical account of his upbringing in Inglewood. Working at the Beverly Hills Niketown while formulating the script, Famuyiwa wanted his first film to be reminiscent of his family and his friends. Famuyiwa and his family had moved to Inglewood while he was in junior high and The Wood, which Famuyiwa wrote and directed, reflects select experiences he had with his close friends and family.

During his time at the Sundance Director's Lab, Famuyiwa perfected the film's script and identified close to half of the cast, Omar Epps and Taye Diggs included. In the film, the characters played by Epps and Richard T. Jones struggle to bring Diggs' character back to consciousness after he unexpectedly becomes intoxicated a couple hours before his own wedding. While attempting to sober him up and bring him back to reality, the three friends from junior high reminisce on their times as adolescents in "the Wood", an affectionate abbreviation for their hometown of Inglewood.

The film was produced by MTV Films and was released on July 16, 1999. Speaking of his partnership with MTV for The Wood, Famuyiwa states, "[MTV Films] had the best concept and could deal with it better because it was young, [it had] the music and they wanted to make a film with predominantly African-American characters." The Wood was produced for an estimated cost of $6 million and went on to gross over $25 million at the box office in the United States alone.

=== Brown Sugar (2002) ===
Famuyiwa once again employed a predominantly African American cast (some of the actors also played roles in The Wood) in Brown Sugar, lifelong friends Dre, played by Taye Diggs, and Sidney, played by Sanaa Lathan, cross paths and although each has their respective responsibilities and obligations to their significant others, they ultimately find that their affections for one another extend beyond platonic friendship. Hip-hop music plays an intricate part in the film as both Dre and Sidney are connected through their passion for the music genre and culture that emanates from it.

Brown Sugar was released on October 11, 2002. The film was marketed extensively by distributor Fox Searchlight Pictures and made $10 million in its opening weekend, ultimately grossing close to $28 million nationwide.

=== Talk to Me (2007) ===
Talk to Me was co-written by Famuyiwa with the film's inspiration's son, Michael Genet, and close friend Kasi Lemmons ultimately directed the film.

In the film, influential 1960s African American radio personality Ralph "Petey" Greene and his contributions to American popular culture and the Civil Rights Movement are chronicled. The film explores the construction of race and race relations during this volatile period of American history.

Talk to Me was released on August 3, 2007. The independent film grossed $400,000 in its opening weekend and nationwide, the film made close to $5 million.

=== Our Family Wedding (2010) ===
Our Family Wedding starring Forest Whitaker, America Ferrera, Carlos Mencia, and Lance Gross. Famuyiwa first became attached to the project two years prior, in 2008, when the presidential campaign was in full swing. With Barack Obama possibly becoming the first African American president, Famuyiwa was interested in making a film that would be reflective of the exciting, changing times. Recounting on the film, Famuyiwa expresses, "At the time the entire debate seemed to be around Hispanics voting for an African-American president. We've all seen these projections of how society is going to look in 50 years. We're all going to have to deal with each other culturally. It felt like a great opportunity to tell that story without being preachy."

The New York Times critiqued the film saying, "Like weddings, wedding movies have their traditions: the dress is white and, usually, so are the characters. Fox Searchlight's Our Family Wedding, which opens this Friday, subverts that custom…"

In Our Family Wedding, two college students, portrayed by Ferrera and Gross, decide to get married and must break the news to their family and loved ones. Commenting on his film, Famuyiwa states, "Wedding films are always about the differences between people but they haven't quite dealt with African Americans and Latinos."

The film made nearly $8 million in its opening weekend and overall, $20 million nationwide.

=== Dope (2015) ===
Dope (2015), both written and directed by Famuyiwa, is a coming-of-age film that premiered at the 2015 Sundance Film Festival, winning the Best Editing award for the work of editor Lee Haugen. It stars Shameik Moore, Tony Revolori, Kiersey Clemons, Blake Anderson, Zoë Kravitz, and A$AP Rocky.

=== Confirmation (2016) ===
Famuyiwa directed Confirmation (2016), an HBO original film. The film starred Kerry Washington as Anita Hill, and depicted the Clarence Thomas Supreme Court nomination, as Hill testified that Clarence Thomas had sexually harassed her.

== Unrealized projects ==
=== The Flash ===
In June 2016, Famuyiwa was announced as the director for The Flash after Seth Grahame-Smith dropped from the project.

In October 2016, Famuyiwa left the project. He had been on board since June developing the project, even overseeing the castings of Kiersey Clemons and Billy Crudup in key roles. Famuyiwa gave a statement to The Hollywood Reporter on the matter:

When I was approached by Warner Bros and DC about the possibility of directing The Flash, I was excited about the opportunity to enter this amazing world of characters that I loved growing up, and still do to this day. I was also excited to work with Ezra Miller, who is a phenomenal young actor. I pitched a version of the film in line with my voice, humor, and heart. While it's disappointing that we couldn't come together creatively on the project, I remain grateful for the opportunity. I will continue to look for opportunities to tell stories that speak to a fresh generational, topical, and multicultural point of view. I wish Warner Brothers, DC, Jon Berg, Geoff Johns, and Ezra Miller all the best as they continue their journey into the speed force.

He was replaced by Andy Muschietti. The film was released in 2023.

=== Sadé ===
In July 2018, Famuyiwa was announced to produce a film called Sadé, written by Ola Shokunbi and Lindsey Reed Palmer and centered on an African princess. The film would be produced by Walt Disney Pictures with Famuyiwa producing under his company Verse. However, there have been no updates on the film since.

=== Children of Blood and Bone ===
In February 2019, Famuyiwa was announced as the director of Children of Blood and Bone at Fox 2000 Pictures. The film would be an adaptation of an Afro-fantasy, young adult novel of the same name by Tomi Adeyemi. In March 2019, the Walt Disney Company acquired 21st Century Fox, and the project was subsequently transferred to Lucasfilm. Wanting to focus on its on intellectual properties, LucasFilm quietly put the project in turnaround and eventually allowed the film rights to lapse. In December 2023, it was announced that Paramount Pictures, which had acquired the film rights in January 2022, hired Gina Prince-Bythewood to direct. In February 2025, Adeyemi shared via instagram that filming began, and in June 2025, it was announced that filming wrapped.

== Film and race ==
In 2003, Famuyiwa served on a panel of directors for a discussion conducted by the Directors Guild of America African American Steering Committee. In the panel, other African American directors Kasi Lemmons and Gary Hardwick joined Famuyiwa as they discussed the challenges and opportunities faced by African American directors in the cinema industry. Reflecting on his own experiences of securing funding and support for his films, Famuyiwa believes that there are still many stereotypes and barriers to break down in the industry in order for African Americans to be accredited the respect they deserve.

A common belief and reality for African American filmmakers like Famuyiwa is that films with a majority black cast and direction often face obstacles in securing funding and support for such projects. Famuyiwa explains that there is a formula to be followed in order for anything to happen for a black director saying, "Make it under $10 million, put this much into marketing, make 25 to 35 million dollars and we'll walk away with a profitable film. And as long as you can deliver scripts that are under $10 million with no effects, that you can shoot in 30 days and get back 'X' amount, I think you can always have a steady stream of a certain kind of film."

While working on The Wood, Famuyiwa experienced difficulties in generating the kind of support he would need to make the film a box office hit. In sum, it was hard for Famuyiwa to have others take him seriously at times. Although the film did recuperate its costs, it did not reap the kinds of financial success that major Hollywood directors often experience, some say because of the African American cast or that it was directed and written by an African American.

Famuyiwa's films mainly explore themes of racial diversity and acceptance of oneself and others, especially within communities of color. In the majority of Famuyiwa's films, friendship plays a central role to the characters' development and progression throughout the film.

== Filmography ==
Short film

Year	Title	Director	Writer	Executive producer
1996	Blacktop Lingo	Yes	Yes	No
2017	The Lost	No	No	Yes
2022	Welcome to NBA Lane	Yes	No	No
2024	Ugo: A Homecoming Story	Yes	No	No

Feature film

Year	Title	Director	Writer	Notes
1999	The Wood	Yes	Yes	
2002	Brown Sugar	Yes	Yes	
2007	Talk to Me	No	Yes	
2010	Our Family Wedding	Yes	Yes	
2015	Dope	Yes	Yes	Also executive producer
2023	The Flash	No	Additional	
2026	The Mandalorian and Grogu	No	No	Role: Jib Dodger

Television

Year	Title	Director	Writer	Executive producer	Notes
2016	Confirmation	Yes	No	No	Television film
2017	Hasan Minhaj: Homecoming King	No	No	Yes	Television documentary special
2017–present	The Chi	Yes	No	Yes	Director: "Pilot"; Executive producer: 78 episodes
2019–2023	The Mandalorian	Yes	Yes	Yes	Director: 6 episodes (including "Chapter 2: The Child", "Chapter 6: The Prisoner" and "Chapter 15: The Believer"); Writer: 2 episodes ("Chapter 6: The Prisoner" and "Chapter 15: The Believer"); Executive producer: 8 episodes Cameo as "Jib Dodger": 3 episodes
2021–2022	We Will Be Monsters	Yes	Yes	No	Animated mini-series (4 episodes)
2022	They Call Me Magic	Yes	No	Yes	Documentary mini-series (4 episodes)
2023	Ahsoka	Yes	No	No	Episode: "Part Eight: The Jedi, the Witch, and the Warlord"

== Awards ==
In 2000, The Black Reel Awards nominated Famuyiwa for Best Director (Theatrical) for his work on The Wood. Later on that year, the National Association for the Advancement of Colored People (NAACP) Image Awards nominated The Wood for Outstanding Motion Picture.

In 2003, after completing work on Brown Sugar Famuyiwa was once again nominated by the NAACP Image Awards for Outstanding Motion Picture.

In 2008, while working on Our Family Wedding, Famuyiwa was recognized for his work on Kasi Lemmons' Talk To Me by the NAACP Image Awards. The Association nominated Talk To Me for Outstanding Motion Picture and Famuyiwa won for Outstanding Writing in a Motion Picture (Theatrical or Television).
