= Ill Gotten Gains =

Ill-Gotten Gains
- Directed by: Joel B. Marsden
- Screenplay by: Joel B. Marsden
- Starring: Djimon Hounsou; Akosua Busia; De'Aundre Bonds; Ciabe Hartley; Tony Torn; Tom Taglang; Eartha Kitt
- Cinematography: Ben Kufrin
- Release date: 1997
- Country: United States

Ill-Gotten Gains is a 1997 American drama film starring Djimon Hounsou.

== Plot ==
Africans revolt while imprisoned aboard a slave ship.

== See also ==
- List of films featuring slavery
