= Joe discography =

- Studio albums: 13
- Compilation albums: 2
- Singles: 30
- Music videos: 32

This is the discography of American R&B singer, Joe.

== Albums ==
=== Studio albums ===
List of albums, with selected chart positions
Title	Album details	Peak chart positions								Certifications
Title	Album details	US	US R&B	AUS	CAN	FRE	NL	SWE	UK	Certifications
Everything	Released: August 17, 1993; Label: Fontana, Polygram; Format: CD, CS	105	16	160	—	—	—	—	53	
All That I Am	Released: July 29, 1997; Label: Jive; Format: CD, CS	13	4	115	100	—	29	52	26	RIAA: Platinum; BPI: Silver
My Name Is Joe	Released: April 18, 2000; Label: Jive; Format: CD, CS, digital download	2	1	43	6	21	7	58	46	RIAA: 3× Platinum; BPI: Gold; MC: Platinum
Better Days	Released: December 11, 2001; Label: Jive; Format: CD, digital download	32	3	84	—	96	41	—	96	RIAA: Gold; BPI: Silver
And Then...	Released: December 2, 2003; Label: Jive; Format: CD, digital download	26	4	130	—	108	28	—	73	RIAA: Gold; BPI: Silver
Ain't Nothin' Like Me	Released: April 24, 2007; Label: Jive; Format: CD, digital download	2	1	—	—	101	60	—	25	
Joe Thomas, New Man	Released: September 23, 2008; Label: Universal, Kedar; Format: CD, digital download	8	3	—	—	—	—	—	90	
Signature	Released: July 14, 2009; Label: BMG, Universal, Kedar, 563; Format: CD, digital download	7	2	—	—	—	—	—	123	
Home Is the Essence of Christmas	Released: November 2, 2010; Label: Kedar; Format: CD, digital download	—	—	—	—	—	—	—	—	
The Good, the Bad, the Sexy	Released: October 18, 2011; Label: Kedar; Format: CD, digital download	8	2	—	—	—	—	—	199	
Doubleback: Evolution of R&B	Released: July 2, 2013; Label: Massenburg Media, RED; Format: CD, digital download	6	4	—	—	—	—	—	—	
Bridges	Released: June 24, 2014; Label: Plaid Takeover, BMG; Format: CD, digital download	17	3	—	—	—	—	—	—	
My Name Is Joe Thomas	Released: November 11, 2016; Label: Plaid Takeover, BMG; Format: CD, digital download	17	2	—	—	—	—	—	—	
"—" denotes a recording that did not chart or was not released in that territory.

=== Compilation albums ===
List of albums, with selected chart positions
Title	Album details	Peak chart positions		Certifications
Title	Album details	US	US R&B	Certifications
Greatest Hits	Released: October 14, 2008; Label: Jive, Zomba; Format: CD, digital download	125	12	BPI: Silver
S.O.U.L: Joe	Released: May 29, 2012; Label: SBME; Format: Digital download	—	58	

=== Live albums ===
List of albums, with selected chart positions
Title	Album details	Peak chart positions
Title	Album details	JPN
Live From Japan	Released: July 28, 2010; Label: Kedar, Sony Music Japan; Format: CD, digital download	165

=== Video albums ===
List of albums, with selected chart positions
Title	Album details
Joe Video Collection: I Wanna Know and More Video	Released: May 15, 2001; Label: Sony Legacy; Format: VHS, DVD

== EPs ==
List of EPs, with selected chart positions
Title	EP details	Peak chart positions	
Title	EP details	US	US R&B
Make Sure You're Home for Christmas	Released: October 13, 2009; Label: Kedar; Format: CD, digital download	52	16
iTunes Live From SoHo	Released: June 29, 2010; Label: Kedar; Format: digital download	—	48

== Singles ==
=== As lead artist ===
List of singles, with selected chart positions
Title	Year	Peak chart positions							Certifications	Album
Title	Year	US	US R&B	AUS	CAN	JAM Air.	NZ	UK	Certifications	Album
"I'm in Luv"	1993	64	10	144	—	*	—	22		Everything
"The One for Me"	1993	—	39	164	—	*	—	34		Everything
"All or Nothing"	1993	—	33	—	—	*	—	56		Everything
"All the Things (Your Man Won't Do)"	1996	11	2	178	—	*	26	34	RIAA: Gold	All That I Am
"Don't Wanna Be a Player"	1997	21	5	125	—	*	21	16	RIAA: Gold	All That I Am
"The Love Scene"	1997	—	—	185	—	*	31	22		All That I Am
"Good Girls"	1997	—	—	—	—	*	—	29		All That I Am
"All That I Am"	1997	—	—	—	—	*	—	52		All That I Am
"No One Else Comes Close"	1998	—	—	—	—	*	—	41		All That I Am
"I Wanna Know"	2000	4	2	34	6	10	—	37		My Name Is Joe
"Treat Her Like a Lady"	2000	63	15	170	—	*	—	60		My Name Is Joe
"Stutter" (featuring Mystikal)	2001	1	1	19	32	*	42	7	RIAA: Gold	My Name Is Joe
"Let's Stay Home Tonight"	2001	68	18	72	—	*	—	29		Better Days
"What If a Woman"	2002	63	21	—	—	*	—	53		Better Days
"More & More"	2003	48	15	32	—	*	—	12		And Then...
"Ride wit U" (featuring G-Unit)	2004	56	22	32	—	*	—	12		And Then...
"Priceless"	2004	—	72	—	—	*	—	—		And Then...
"Where You At" (featuring Papoose)	2006	—	79	—	—	*	—	92		Ain't Nothin' Like Me
"If I Was Your Man"	2007	84	32	—	—	*	—	—		Ain't Nothin' Like Me
"My Love"	2007	—	35	—	—	*	—	—		Ain't Nothin' Like Me
"E.R. (Emergency Room)"	2008	—	32	—	—	*	—	—		Joe Thomas, New Man
"We Need to Roll"	2008	—	55	—	—	*	—	—		Joe Thomas, New Man
"Why Just Be Friends"	2008	—	85	—	—	*	—	—		Joe Thomas, New Man
"Majic"	2009	—	57	—	—	*	—	—		Signature
"Worst Case Scenario"	2010	—	52	—	—	*	—	—		Signature
"Closer"	2011	—	50	—	—	*	—	—		Sacred Love Songs 2
"Losing"	2011	—	—	—	—	*	—	—		The Good, The Bad, The Sexy
"Dear Joe"	2011	—	71	—	—	*	—	—		The Good, The Bad, The Sexy
"I'd Rather Have a Love"	2013	—	—	—	—	*	—	—		Double Back: Evolution of R&B
"Love & Sex" (featuring Fantasia)	2013	—	—	—	—	*	—	—		Double Back: Evolution of R&B
"Love & Sex, Pt. 2" (featuring Kelly Rowland)	2014	—	—	—	—	*	—	—		Bridges
"If You Lose Her"	2015	—	—	—	—	*	—	—		Bridges
"So I Can Have You Back"	2016	—	—	—	—	*	—	—		My Name Is Joe Thomas
"Happy Hour" (featuring Gucci Mane)	2017	—	—	—	—	*	—	—		My Name Is Joe Thomas
"Lean Into It"	2017	—	—	—	—	*	—	—		My Name Is Joe Thomas
"Don't Lock Me Out"	2018	—	—	—	—	*	—	—		My Name Is Joe Thomas
"Lay You Down"	2019	—	—	—	—	*	—	—		My Name Is Joe Thomas
"—" denotes a recording that did not chart or was not released in that territory. "*" denotes that the chart did not exist at that time.

=== As featured artist ===
List of singles, with selected chart positions
Title	Year	Peak chart positions					Album
Title	Year	US	US R&B	AUS	NZ	UK	Album
"All My Love All the Time" (Prince Markie Dee featuring Joe)	1995	—	—	—	—	—	Love Daddy
"Still Not a Player" (Big Pun featuring Joe)	1998	24	3	—	37	—	Capital Punishment
"Faded Pictures" (Case featuring Joe)	1998	10	3	—	—	—	Personal Conversation
"Bet She Don't Love You" (A+ featuring Joe)	1999	—	—	—	—	—	Hempstead High
"Thank God I Found You" (with Mariah Carey featuring 98 Degrees)	1999	1	1	27	34	10	Rainbow
"Listen to Your Man" (Chico DeBarge featuring Joe)	1999	—	41	—	—	—	The Game
"Coming Back Home" (BeBe Winans featuring Brian McKnight & Joe)	2000	—	—	—	—	—	Love & Freedom
"Everything's Everything" (AZ featuring Joe)	2001	—	—	—	—	—	9 Lives
"More Than a Woman" (with Angie Stone)	2001	—	63	—	—	—	Mahogany Soul
"Wanna Get to Know You" (G-Unit featuring Joe)	2003	15	10	30	26	27	Beg for Mercy
"I Used to Be in Love" (Nick Cannon featuring Joe)	2003	—	—	—	—	—	Nick Cannon
"Not Your Average Joe" (with Joe Budden & Fat Joe)	2004	—	—	—	—	—	—N/a
"Curious" (Tony Yayo featuring Joe)	2005	—	65	—	—	—	Thoughts of a Predicate Felon
"Test Drive" (Keith Sweat featuring Joe)	2010	—	58	—	—	—	Ridin' Solo
"Perfect Party" (Naughty by Nature featuring Joe)	2011	—	59	—	—	—	Anthem Inc.
"Take It" (LL Cool J featuring Joe)	2012	—	—	—	—	—	Authentic
"Big Rich Town" (50 Cent featuring Joe)	2014	—	—	—	—	—	—N/a
"Don't Make Me Wait Too Long" (Kimberly Brewer featuring Stevie Wonder, and Joe)	2023	—	—	—	—	—	—N/a
"—" denotes a recording that did not chart or was not released in that territory.
