= Greatest Hits (Joe album) =

Greatest hits album by Joe
- Released: October 13, 2008
- Length: 62:07
- Label: Jive

Joe chronology
Joe Thomas, New Man (2008)	Greatest Hits (2008)	Signature (2009)

Greatest Hits is the first compilation album by R&B singer, Joe. It was released by Jive Records on October 13, 2008 in the United Kingdom and October 14 in the United States, completing his contract with the label.

== Critical reception ==
Professional ratings
Review scores
Source	Rating
AllMusic	4.5/5 stars

AllMusic editor Andy Kellman rated the album four and a half stars out of five. He wrote: "While each of the albums from this phase of Joe's career has strong cuts that were not released as singles, this set is ideal for casual fans" and calle "Beautiful" one "of his sweeter tracks, but it's not up to the standard of his best-known material."

== Commercial performance ==
In the United States, the album debuted and peaked at number 12 on the Top R&B/Hip-Hop Albums chart. Elsewhere, Greatest Hits failed to chart noticeably, only reaching number 125 on the US Billboard 200. On February 25, 2022, the album certified silver by the British Phonographic Industry (BPI) for sles and streaming figures in excess of 60,000 copies.

== Track listing ==
No.	Title	Writer(s)	Producer(s)	Length
1.	"Beautiful"	Phillip T. Jackson; David Guppy; Joseph Aschalew; Bradley Brown	The Underdogs	4:04
2.	"Don't Wanna Be a Player"	Joe Thomas; Japhe Tejeda; Jolyon Skinner; Michele Williams; Rodney Jerkins	Joe; Jerkins	3:51
3.	"All the Things (Your Man Won't Do)"	Thomas; Joshua Thompson; Williams	Joe; Thompson	4:23
4.	"I Wanna Know"	Thomas; Skinner; Williams	Joe; Tony Nicholas; Timmy Allen^{[a]}	4:05
5.	"Good Girls"	Thomas; Thompson; Williams	Joe; Thompson	3:16
6.	"Ride wit U" (featuring G-Unit)	Ivan Barias; David Brown; Carvin Haggins; Curtis Jackson; Christopher Lloyd; Frank Romano; James Rayshawn Smith	Frankie "Vegas" Romano; Carvin & Ivan^{[c]}	4:14
7.	"Still Not a Player" (Big Pun featuring Joe)	Christopher Rios; Jerome Foster	Knobody	3:47
8.	"Stutter" (Double Take remix) (featuring Mystikal)	Roy "Royalty" Hamilton; Ernest E. Dixon; Trevant Hardson; Emandu Wilcox; Romye Robinson; Derrick Stewart; Steve Boone; John Sebastian; Mark Sebastian	Teddy Riley; Hamilton^{[a]}; Allen Gordon^{[b]}	3:33
9.	"The Love Scene"	Thomas; Skinner; Williams	Joe; Nicholas	3:36
10.	"All That I Am"	Larry Lofton; Mattias Gustafsson	Joe; Nicholas	3:42
11.	"More & More"	R. Kelly	Kelly	3:47
12.	"Priceless"	Damon Thomas; Harvey Mason, Jr.; Eric Dawkins; Antonio Dixon	The Underdogs	4:35
13.	"If I Was Your Man"	Tor Hermansen; Phillip Jackson; Mikkel Eriksen	Stargate	3:52
14.	"Let's Stay Home Tonight"	Gordon; Joel Campbell; Johnta Austin	Joe; Gordon; Campbell^{[a]}	3:26

Notes

- ^{^[a]} signifies additional producer(s)
- ^{^[b]} signifies remix producer(s)
- ^{^[c]} signifies co-producer(s)

Sample credits

- "Stutter" contains a sample from "Passin' Me By" as performed by The Pharcyde.

== Charts ==
=== Weekly charts ===
Weekly chart performance for Greatest Hits
Chart (2008)	Peak position
US Billboard 200	125
US Top R&B/Hip-Hop Albums (Billboard)	12

== Certifications ==
Certifications and sales for Greatest Hits
Region	Certification	Certified units/sales
United Kingdom (BPI)	Silver	60,000^{‡}
^{‡} Sales+streaming figures based on certification alone.

== Release history ==
Greatest Hits release history
Region	Date	Format(s)	Label	Ref.
United Kingdom	October 13, 2008	CD; digital download	Jive	
United States	October 14, 2008	CD; digital download	Jive	
