= My Love (Joe song) =

Single by Joe

from the album Ain't Nothin' Like Me
- Released: September 8, 2007
- Length: 4:04
- Label: Jive
- Songwriters: Greg Curtis; Johnta Austin; Bryan-Michael Cox
- Producers: Greg Curtis; Bryan-Michael Cox; Kendrick "WyldCard" Dean

Joe singles chronology
"If I Was Your Man" (2007)	"My Love" (2007)	"E.R. (Emergency Room)" (2008)

"My Love" is a song by American R&B singer Joe. It was written by Greg Curtis, Johnta Austin, and Bryan-Michael Cox for his sixth studio album Ain't Nothin' Like Me (2007), while production was helmed by Cox and Curtis, featuring co-production from Kendrick "WyldCard" Dean. Released as the album's third and final single, it peaked at number two on the US Billboard Adult R&B Songs chart.

== Track listings ==
Promotional single
No.	Title	Length
1.	"My Love" (Main)	4:04
2.	"My Love" (Instrumental)	4:04

== Credits and personnel ==
- Chris Athens – mastering
- Johnta Austin – writer
- Bryan-Michael Cox – producer, writer
- Greg Curtis – producer, writer
- Kendrick "WyldCard" Dean – co-producer
- Joe – executive producer
- Kedar Massenburg – executive producer

== Charts ==
Weekly chart performance for "My Love"
Chart (2008)	Peak position
US Adult R&B Songs (Billboard)	2
US Hot R&B/Hip-Hop Songs (Billboard)	35
