= If You Lose Her =

Single by Joe

from the album Bridges
- Released: 2015
- Length: 4:13
- Label: Plaid Takeover; BMG
- Songwriters: Joe Thomas; Alvin Garrett; Gerald Isaac; Derek Allen
- Producers: Gerald Isaac; Derek "D.O.A." Allen

Joe singles chronology
"Love & Sex, Pt. 2" (2014)	"If You Lose Her" (2015)	"So I Can Have You Back" (2016)

"If You Lose Her" is a song by American R&B singer Joe. It was written by Joe, Alvin Garrett, Derek "D.O.A." Allen, and Gerald Isaac for his eleventh studio album Bridges (2014), while production was helmed by Isaac and Allen. Released as the album's second single, it peaked at number six on the US Billboard Adult R&B Songs.

== Charts ==
Chart (2015)	Peak position
US Adult R&B Songs (Billboard)	6
