= Home Is the Essence of Christmas =

Studio album by Joe
- Released: November 2, 2010
- Recorded: 2009
- Genre: R&B; Christmas
- Label: Kedar
- Producer: Joe (also exec.); Kedar Massenburg (exec.); Joshua P. Thompson

Joe chronology
Make Sure You're Home for Christmas (2009)	Home Is the Essence of Christmas (2010)	The Good, the Bad, the Sexy (2011)

Professional ratings
Review scores
Source	Rating
Allmusic	3.5/5 stars

Home Is the Essence of Christmas is the ninth studio album by American R&B singer Joe, released on November 2, 2010. The album features 10 songs, including album Make Sure You're Home for Christmas's six songs and three Joe originals ("Christmas in New York", "It Ain't Christmas", "Make Sure You're Home"). It was recorded and mixed by veteran producer/engineer Gene Lennon in Joshua Thompson’s studios in New Jersey.

== Track ==
No.	Title	Songwriter(s)	Length
1.	"God Rest Ye Merry, Gentlemen"	traditional	4:04
2.	"The Christmas Song"	Mel Tormé; Robert Wells	4:41
3.	"Christmas in New York"	Joshua Thompson	3:20
4.	"Christmas Time Is Here"	Vince Guaraldi; Lee Mendelson	3:40
5.	"Grown-Up Christmas List"	David Foster; Amy Grant; Linda Thompson-Jenner	4:55
6.	"Have Yourself a Merry Little Christmas"	Ralph Blane; Hugh Martin	5:29
7.	"I'll Be Home for Christmas"	Kim Gannon; Walter Kent; Buck Ram	2:53
8.	"It Ain't Christmas"	Joshua Thompson	4:23
9.	"Make Sure You're Home"	Joe Thomas; Joshua Thompson	4:32
10.	"Have Yourself a Merry Little Christmas (Instrumental)"	Ralph Blane; Hugh Martin	5:29
