= Let's Stay Home Tonight =

Let's Stay Home Tonight may refer to:

- "Let's Stay Home Tonight" (song), by R&B singer Joe from Better Days, 2001
- "Let's Stay Home Tonight", a song by American Christian rock band Needtobreathe from Hard Love, 2016
- "Let's Stay Home Tonight", a 1954 single by Julius La Rosa

== See also ==
- "Let's Just Stay Home Tonight", a song by Helen Reddy from Play Me Out, 1981
