= Doubleback (disambiguation) =

Doubleback may refer to:

- Doubleback: Evolution of R&B, a 2013 album by Joe
- "Doubleback" (song)
- "Doubleback Alley", song by the Rutles, pastiche of Penny Lane, from The Rutles
