= Make Sure You're Home for Christmas =

EP by Joe
- Released: October 13, 2009
- Genre: Christmas, R&B
- Label: Kedar
- Producer: Joe

Joe chronology
Signature (2009)	Make Sure You're Home for Christmas (2009)	Home Is the Essence of Christmas (2010)

Make Sure You're Home for Christmas is a Christmas EP by American R&B singer Joe. Sold exclusively at American retail company Target, it was released on October 13, 2009. Produced by Joe himself, it marked his first Christmas project, including three cover versions of Christmas standards and three originals songs, one of which had previously been recorded with R&B group Profyle featuring Joe and Chico DeBarge, as well as another rendition performed by R&B group Black Coffee featuring Joe.

== Critical reception ==
Professional ratings
Review scores
Source	Rating
AllMusic	3.5/5 stars

AllMusic editor Andy Kellman called the EP a "pleasant surprise for Joe's fans."

== Track listing ==
Make Sure You're Home for Christmas track listing
No.	Title	Writer(s)	Length
1.	"God Rest Ye Merry Gentlemen"	Grace Price; Robert Lee Black	4:03
2.	"Have Yourself a Merry Little Christmas"	Hugh Martin; Ralph Blane	5:30
3.	"The Christmas Song"	Mel Tormé; Robert Wells	4:42
4.	"Grown Up Christmas List"	David Foster; Linda Thompson-Jenner	4:55
5.	"It Ain't Christmas"	Joe Thomas	4:25
6.	"Make Sure You're Home"	Thomas	4:33

== Charts ==
Weekly chart performance for Make Sure You're Home for Christmas
Chart (2010)	Peak position
US Billboard 200	52
US Independent Albums (Billboard)	3
US Top R&B/Hip-Hop Albums (Billboard)	16
