= All or Nothing (Joe song) =

Single by Joe

from the album Everything
- Released: 1994
- Genre: Pop hip-hop
- Length: 5:10
- Label: Polygram
- Songwriters: Joe Thomas; Denvil Tracey Gerrell; Keith Miller
- Producers: Joe; Keith Miller

Joe singles chronology
| "The One for Me" (1993) | "All or Nothing" (1994) | "All the Things (Your Man Won't Do)" (1996) |

Music video
- "All or Nothing" on YouTube

"All or Nothing" is a song by American R&B singer Joe. It was written by Joe, Denvil Tracey Gerrell, and Keith Miller for his debut studio album, Everything (1993), while production was helmed by Joe, featuring co-production from Miller. Released in 1994 by Polygram Records as the album's third single, it reached number 33 on the US Billboard Hot R&B/Hip-Hop Songs chart, while peaking at number 56 on the UK Singles Chart.

== Critical reception ==
Larry Flick from Billboard magazine wrote, "Watch this suave vocalist build a larger, more ardent following once this slinky, downtempo pop/hip-hop ditty begins to circulate. Marriage of smooth and easy singing with quietly percussive groove is made in heaven, and equally viable in older and teen-skewed sectors." Andy Beevers from the Record Mirror Dance Update gave it a score of four out of five, complimenting it as a "soulful plea for devotion". Another Record Mirror editor, James Hamilton, named the song a "huskily moaned mellow 86.5bpm list of his 'lurve' wants" in his weekly dance column.

== Track listings ==
UK CD single
| No. | Title | Length |
|---|---|---|
| 1. | "All or Nothing" (UK Radio Edit) | 3:59 |
| 2. | "All or Nothing" (LP Version) | 5:12 |
| 3. | "All or Nothing" (Jeep Mix) | 4:44 |
| 4. | "All or Nothing" (Butt Mix) | 4:49 |
| 5. | "All or Nothing" (Big O Mix) | 4:58 |
| 6. | "All or Nothing" (To Get Some Butt Mix) | 5:08 |
| 7. | "All or Nothing" (Poor Georgie Porgie Mix) | 5:50 |

== Credits and personnel ==
- Denvil Tracey Gerrell – writer
- Keith Miller – producer, writer
- Adam Hudzim – mixing
- Joe Thomas – producer, vocals, writer

== Charts ==
| Chart (1994) | Peak position |
|---|---|
| UK Singles (Official Charts) | 56 |
| UK Dance (Official Charts) | 29 |
| UK Hip Hop/R&B (Official Charts) | 10 |
| UK Dance (Music Week) | 29 |
| UK Club Chart (Music Week) | 5 |
| US Billboard Hot 100 | 100 |
| US Adult R&B Songs (Billboard) | 27 |
| US Hot R&B/Hip-Hop Songs (Billboard) | 33 |
