= I'd Rather Have a Love =

Single by Joe

from the album Doubleback: Evolution of R&B
- Released: February 26, 2013
- Length: 3:45
- Label: Massenburg
- Songwriter(s): Gerald Issac; Derek Allen; Alvin Garrett
- Producer(s): Derek "D.O.A." Allen

Joe singles chronology
""Dear Joe" (2011)	"I'd Rather Have a Love" (2013)	"Love & Sex" (2013)

"I'd Rather Have a Love" is a song by American R&B singer Joe. It was written by Gerald Isaac, Derek "D.O.A." Allen, and Alvin Garrett for his tenth studio album Doubleback: Evolution of R&B (2013), while production was overseen by Allen. Released as the album's lead single, it peaked at number five on the US Billboard Adult R&B Songs chart.

Commenting on its release, Joe stated, that it "certainly represents my style and flavor [...] It has that really romantic element to it. It also speaks a lot of guys in a relationship that have a good thing going on but sometimes you know how we are. We forget what we have and we treat things a little differently. This is just a reminder basically, “I’d rather have love than nothing at all”. Who wants to be alone? It's a great song."

== Charts ==
Chart (2013)	Peak position
US Adult R&B Songs (Billboard)	5
