= Bridges (Joe album) =

Studio album by Joe
- Released: June 24, 2014
- Length: 62:21
- Label: Plaid Takeover
- Producer: Derek "D.O.A." Allen; Element; Gerald "Plaid" Isaac; Philip "Taj" Jackson; Vic "Dahitmaka" Zapata

Joe chronology
| Doubleback: Evolution of R&B (2013) | Bridges (2014) | My Name Is Joe Thomas (2016) |

Singles from Bridges
- 1. "Love & Sex, Pt. 2" Released: March 4, 2014; 2. "If You Lose Her" Released: 2015

Bridges is the twelfth studio album by American musician Joe. It was released by on June 24, 2014 in the United States. The album marked his debut with co-executive producer Gerald Isaac's Plaid Takeover Entertainment after severing business ties with his longtime manager Kedar Massenburg. As with his previous release, 2013's Doubleback: Evolution of R&B, the album was chiefly produced by Derek "D.O.A." Allen, with additional contribution from Isaac, Philip Jackson, Vic Zapata and production team Element.

The album earned generally positive reviews from music critics, who called it one of Joe's best album projects, though some found that Bridges was overlong. The album debuted at number 17 on the US Billboard 200, with first-week sales of 15,000 copies. The first single released from the album was "Love & Sex, Pt. 2", a sequel to his 2013 song featuring singer Kelly Rowland, followed by "If You Lose Her," a top ten hit on the US Adult R&B Songs chart.

== Critical reception ==
Professional ratings
Review scores
| Source | Rating |
|---|---|
| AllMusic | 4/5 stars |

AllMusic editor Andy Kellman called the album one of Joe's "best albums" and found that "while Bridges verges on pastiche and nearly outstays its welcome at 16 songs in 60-plus minutes, its vibrant nature is undeniable. Joe is engaging from beginning to end without sounding as if he's trying particularly hard, and he gets a tremendous amount of help from Derek "DOA" Allen, who produced all but two of the songs. Overall, this is more finely detailed than the majority of adult contemporary R&B, and there's a little more rhythmic bite through some deft dancefloor-aimed material."

Similarly, Boston Globe critic Ken Capobianco wrote that "although the 16-song disc is overlong, [Joe] covers diverse musical ground while showcasing his elastic tenor. The songs remain contemporary even as he nods to his influences." Melody Charles from SoulTracks noted: "Missteps and misconceptions aside, Joe's latest will do exactly what he intended to: guide his loyal 90s era fans into a new dimension of musical maturity. Trends change and tastes evolve, but Mr. Thomas's endurance comes from swaying with the currents rather than standing rigidly against them, a practice that makes this particular Bridge well worth the crossing."

== Commercial performance ==
Bridges debuted at number 17 on the US Billboard 200 chart in week of July 12, 2014, with first-week sales of 15,126 copies in the United States. In its second week, the album dropped to number 40, selling another 7,000 copies, bringing its total album sales to 80,000 units.

== Track listing ==
Bridges track listing
| No. | Title | Writer(s) | Producer(s) | Length |
|---|---|---|---|---|
| 1. | "Future Teller" | Joe Thomas; Phillip "Taj" Jackson; Derek "D.O.A." Allen; Gerald Isaac | Allen | 3:38 |
| 2. | "Dilemma" | Thomas; Jackson; Vic "Dahitmaka" Zapata; Michelle Bello | Jackson; Zapata | 4:02 |
| 3. | "Do a Little Dance" | Thomas; Alvin Garrett; Allen; Isaac | Allen | 3:19 |
| 4. | "If You Lose Her" | Thomas; Garrett; Allen; Isaac | Allen; Isaac | 4:13 |
| 5. | "Sex Ain't a Weapon" | Thomas; Garrett; Allen; Isaac | Allen; Isaac | 3:50´ |
| 6. | "Love & Sex, Pt. 2" (featuring Kelly Rowland) | Garrett; Allen; Isaac | Allen | 3:45 |
| 7. | "Blame Her Broken Heart on Me" | Thomas; Allen; Isaac | Allen; Isaac | 3:30 |
| 8. | "First Lady" | Thomas; Garrett; Allen; Isaac | Allen | 3:57 |
| 9. | "Take It to the House" | Thomas; Garrett; Allen; Isaac | Allen | 3:45 |
| 10. | "Till the Rope Gives Way" | Thomas; Philip Jackson; Hitesh Ceon; Kim Ofstad | Element | 4:49 |
| 11. | "The Rest Will Follow" | Thomas; Edrick Miles; Allen; Isaac | Allen | 3:58 |
| 12. | "Mary Jane (Remix)" (featuring 50 Cent) | Thomas; Curtis Jackson; James A. Johnson | Allen | 3:41 |
| 13. | "Bridges" | Thomas; Garrett; Allen; Isaac | Allen | 3:27 |
| 14. | "Love Sex Hollywood" | Thomas; Garrett; Allen; Isaac | Allen | 4:08 |
| 15. | "For Love" | Thomas; Miles; Allen; Isaac | Allen; Isaac | 3:35 |
| 16. | "Love Undefeated" | Thomas; Garrett; Allen; Isaac | Allen; Isaac | 4:38 |
| Total length: | | | | 62:21 |

Sample credits

- "Mary Jane (Remix)" contains replay of "Mary Jane", composed and recorded by Rick James.

== Personnel ==
Credits adapted from the album's liner notes.

- Derek "D.O.A." Allen – produdcer
- Walid Azami – photography
- Andre "East Coast Dre" Booth – mixing
- Aaron "Sincere" Boyd – design, creative art direction
- Element – producer
- Gerald "Plaid" Isaac – executive producer, producer
- Philip "Taj" Jackson – producer
- Dave Kutch – mastering
- Joe Thomas – executive producer
- Pamela Watson – styling, creative director
- Vic "Dahitmaka" Zapata – producer

== Charts ==
=== Weekly charts ===
Weekly chart performance for Bridges
| Chart (2014) | Peak position |
|---|---|
| US Billboard 200 | 17 |
| US Top R&B/Hip-Hop Albums (Billboard) | 3 |
| US Independent Albums (Billboard) | 4 |

=== Year-end charts ===
Year-end chart performance for Bridges
| Chart (2014) | Position |
|---|---|
| US Top R&B/Hip-Hop Albums (Billboard) | 75 |

== Release history ==
Bridges release history
| Region | Date | Format | Label | Distributor | Ref(s) |
|---|---|---|---|---|---|
| Various | June 24, 2014 | CD; digital download | Plaid Takeover | RED | |
