= Lean Into It (song) =

Single by Joe

from the album My Name Is Joe Thomas
- Released: 10 March 2017
- Recorded: 2016
- Genre: R&B
- Length: 4:01
- Label: Plaid Takeover; BMG
- Songwriter(s): Joe Thomas; Derek Allen; Brandon Hodge; Jolyon Skinner; Gerald Isaac; Damien R. Farmer III
- Producer(s): Derek "D.O.A." Allen; Damien Farmer; Gerald Isaac

Joe singles chronology
"Happy Hour" (2017)	"Lean Into It" (2017)	"Don't Lock Me Out" (2018)

"Lean Into It " is a song by American R&B singer Joe. It was written by Joe along with Brandon Hodge, Jolyon Skinner, Derek "D.O.A." Allen, Gerald Isaac, and Damien R. Farmer III for his twelfth studio album My Name Is Joe Thomas. Production was helmed by Farmer, Isaac and Allen. Released as the album's third single, it peaked at number 16 on the US Billboard Adult R&B Songs chart.

== Charts ==
Chart (2017)	Peak position
US Adult R&B Songs (Billboard)	16
