= Signature (Joe album) =

Studio album by Joe
- Released: July 14, 2009
- Length: 52:05
- Label: Kedar
- Producers: Joe; Bryan-Michael Cox; Joshua P. Thompson

Joe chronology
Greatest Hits (2008)	Signature (2009)	Make Sure You're Home for Christmas (2009)

Singles from Signature
- 1. "Majic" Released: June 11, 2009; 2. "Worst Case Scenario" Released: January 19, 2010

Signature is the eighth studio album by American R&B singer Joe. It was released by Kedar Entertainment on July 14, 2009 in the United States. Incorporating cuts from his previous album, Joe Thomas, New Man (2008), the album features ballads written, produced, and arranged by Joe. Besides Joe, frequent collaborator Joshua P. Thompson is credits as a producer on the album.

The album earned largely mixed reviews from critics and debuted number seven on the US Billboard 200, with first week sales of 49,000 copies. Lead single "Majic" and follow-up "Worst Case Scenario" both reached the top 20 on Billboard's Adult R&B Songs chart. The deluxe edition of the album includes remixes to the Joe Thomas, New Man songs "We Need to Roll" and "Man in Your Life", the former featuring Mario and Trey Songz and the latter featuring The Game.

== Background ==
Signature was first announced in June 2008. Initially scheduled to be released around Valentine's Day 2009, it was described as an "all-ballad release." With much of the album already finished by the time Joe Thomas, New Man (2008) was released, several songs from Signature were first previewed as bonus tracks on Joe Thomas, New Man. A breakaway from previous projects, Joe told The Jamaica Gleaner in 2009: "The difference is that it's all live music. I wanted to take it to a throwback of music back in the day when there was no stopping, just a flow of music."

== Critical reception ==
Professional ratings
Review scores
Source	Rating
About.com	4/5 stars
AllMusic	2.5/5 stars

Mark Edward Nero, writing for About.com found that the album was superior to Joe's previous two albums Ain't Nothin' Like Me (2007) and Joe Thomas, New Man (2008) and wrote: "What's different about this album in comparison to his last two is that his past two efforts simply weren't as strong from top to bottom. There were a few songs midway through and/or toward the end of each album that were just kind of there. They weren't bad, just forgettable. But Signature is definitely an album that you can listen to all the through multiple times without once reaching for the fast forward button." Melanie Sims from Associated Press felt that with Signature, Joe "still invokes the sweet, sensitive and sultry. His disc's greatest assets are songs like "Worst Case Scenario" and "Miss My Baby." The first is a slow groove, sung from the perspective of a man who is haunted by thoughts of his ex-lover with a new man. The second couples upbeat production with Joe’s smooth-as-honey vocals to make for a worthy listen."

AllMusic editor Andy Kellman rated the album two and a half stars ouf of five. He found that "it's the lecherous lyrics, more latter-day R. Kelly than Marvin Gaye, that distinguish Signature from the rest of Joe's catalog. When allowed to fade into the background, the album might not sound dramatically different from Joe's past few albums, but it's hard to miss lines [...] which tend not to match up with such polite arrangements -- even when considering that Joe wasn't necessarily a perfect gentleman prior to this." SoulTracks editor Melody Charles was critical with the album first three tracks which she found to "range from slightly lethargic to outright comatose," but noted that "Joe uses the rest of the CD to redeem himself, and Signature ends up delivering what we've always come to expect and enjoy about this talented church musician turned cool, come-hither crooner."

== Commercial performance ==
Signature debuted and peaked at number seven on the US Billboard 200 albums chart in the week of August 1, 2009, with first week sales of 49,000 copies. In addition, it also reached number two on the Top R&B/Hip Hop Albums chart, while also debuting atop Billboard's Independent Albums chart, becoming his second album to do so.

== Track listing ==
Signature track listing
No.	Title	Writer(s)	Producer(s)	Length
1.	"Majic"	Joe Thomas	Joe	3:50
2.	"Sex Girl"	Thomas; Alex "MackMan" Mack	Joe	3:26
3.	"Very Special Friend"	Thomas; Joshua P. Thompson	Joe; Thompson	4:43
4.	"Friends Don't Let Friends"	Thomas; Jolyon Skinner; Thompson; Tonyatta Martinez	Joe; Thompson	5:26
5.	"Worst Case Scenario"	Thomas; Skinner; Thompson; Daniel Crawley; Martinez	Joe; Thompson	5:01
6.	"Wanna Be Your Lover"	Thomas	Joe	4:27
7.	"Miss My Baby"	Thomas	Joe	3:42
8.	"Come Get to This"	Marvin Gaye	Joe	2:53
9.	"Metaphor"	Thomas; Skinner; Thompson	Joe	5:01
10.	"Love's Greatest Episode"	Thomas; Skinner; Thompson	Joe	5:21
11.	"Sensitive Lover"	Thomas; Skinner; Thompson	Joe	4:09

Bonus tracks
No.	Title	Writer(s)	Producer(s)	Length
12.	"Change" (performed by Lylit)	Lylit	Joe	4:02
13.	"We Need to Roll (Remix)" (featuring Mario & Trey Songz)	Bryan-Michael Cox; Johnta Austin; Kendrick Dean	Cox; WyldCard^{[a]}	4:09
14.	"Man in Your Life (Remix)" (featuring The Game)	Cox; Austin	Cox	3:57

Notes

- ^{^[a]} signifies co-producer(s)

== Personnel ==
- Drums: Nat Townsley, Jermaine Parrish, Obed Calvaire, Abe Fogel, Benjamin Lawton
- Programming: Joe Thomas
- Percussion: Victor Jones
- Keyboards: Joe Thomas, John DiMartino, Mike Gallagher
- Fender Rhodes: Bobby Douglas
- Bass: Marshall Knights, LeShawn Thomas, Richard Bona, John Benitez
- Guitar: Mark Bowers, Joshua Paul Thompson, Dylan Jones
- Alto Saxophone: Lawrence Felman
- Tenor Saxophone: Atta Brecker, Ferrer White
- Flute: David Conley
- Trumpet: Randy Brecker, Richard Bougler
- Recording engineer: Elijah Griffin, John Roper, Gene Lennon
- Mixing: Jean-Marie Horvat, Tom Soares
- Mastering: Dave Kutch
- Executive producer: Kedar Massenburg, Joe Thomas
- Photography: Robert Munore, Eduardo Whittington
- Art direction: Kedar Massenburg, Kierstan Tucker-McCollough
- Design: Eduardo Whittington

== Charts ==
=== Weekly charts ===
Weekly chart performance for Signature
Chart (2009)	Peak position
US Billboard 200	7
US Top R&B/Hip-Hop Albums (Billboard)	2
US Independent Albums (Billboard)	1

=== Year-end charts ===
2009 year-end chart performance for Signature
Chart (2009)	Position
US Top R&B/Hip-Hop Albums (Billboard)	63

2010 year-end chart performance for Signature
Chart (2010)	Position
US Top R&B/Hip-Hop Albums (Billboard)	97

== Release history ==
Signature release history
Region	Date	Format	Label	Ref(s)
United States	July 14, 2009	CD; digital download	Kedar	
Japan	July 15, 2009	CD; digital download	Kedar	
United Kingdom	September 21, 2009	CD; digital download	Kedar	
