= Ain't Nothin' Like Me =

Studio album by Joe
- Released: April 24, 2007
- Length: 60:51
- Label: Jive
- Producers: Joe (also exec.); Kedar Massenburg (exec.); Tim & Bob; Cool & Dre; Bryan-Michael Cox; Gregory Curtis; Kendrick Dean; Sean Garrett; Ricky "Ric Rude" Lewis; Oak; Mark Pitts; The Smith Brothers; Stargate; Tank; Joshua P. Thompson; The Underdogs

Joe chronology
And Then ... (2003)	Ain't Nothin' Like Me (2007)	Joe Thomas, New Man (2008)

Singles from Ain't Nothing Like Me
- 1. "Where You At" Released: June 13, 2006; 2. "If I Was Your Man" Released: July 13, 2007; 3. "My Love" Released: September 8, 2007

Ain't Nothin' Like Me is the sixth studio album by American recording artist Joe, released by Jive Records after several delays on April 24, 2007 in the United States. A breakaway from previous projects, Joe co-wrote five songs on the album but left most of the writing and producing to his collaborators, including Bryan Michael Cox and Tank as well as production teams Tim & Bob, Cool & Dre, Stargate, and The Underdogs. Rappers Papoose, Nas, Fabolous, Young Buck, and Tony Yayo appear as guest vocalists.

Upon release, Ain't Nothin' Like Me received generally positive reviews from music critics. It debuted at number two on the US Billboard 200 and on top of the Top R&B/Hip Hop Albums chart, selling 98,000 copies in its first week, while marking his highest-charting album since My Name Is Joe (2000), which had reached the same position of both charts. In support of the album, three singles were released, including lead single "Where You At" and the Hot R&B/Hip-Hop Songs top 20 hit "If I Was Your Man."

== Background ==
In 2003, Joe released his fifth studio album And Then. Produced by Joe's labelmate R. Kelly along with Roy "Royalty" Hamilton, Kevin "Shekspere" Briggs, Carvin & Ivan, and others, the album reached number 26 on the US Billboard 200 albums chart, selling 121,000 copies in its first week of release. It produced the R&B top thirty single "More & More" and "Ride wit U" and was eventually certified gold by the Recording Industry Association of America (RIAA).

Soon after, Joe started work on his sixth full-length album. Aiming for a new direction, while maintaining the romantic, gospel-influenced R&B style mixed in hip-hop elements, the singer collaborated with a different range of writers and producers to create the bulk of the album, including Bryan Michael Cox, Cool & Dre, Sean Garrett, The Smith Brothers, and Tim & Bob. Although he co-wrote five songs on the album, Joe decided to leave most of the writing and producing to his collaborators: “I look at what the record ultimately needs [...] It’s about making a great record, not about how many songs I have on the album. A lot of artists get into writing too much, and the album starts to sound the same. I like working with several different producers who can bring their own sound to the record. It gives the album more variety and dimension.”

In an interview with Jet, Joe further noted: "The only thing different on this album is the tempo. The rhythm of the songs; it's more uptempo than the past albums I put out." The singer named “If I Was Your Man” and “It’s Me” as two of his favorite songs on the album; both tracks were written by the Norwegian duo Stargate. Commenting on their work, Joe elaborated, that "it was a blast working with [them]. They are doing something great for R&B, creating strong midtempo and uptempo songs and tracks. There’s normally a lot of slow ballads in R&B, but they bring in more uptempo grooves and sounds.”

== Critical reception ==
Professional ratings
Review scores
Source	Rating
About.com	3.5/5 stars
AllMusic	4/5 stars
Entertainment Weekly	B−
People	2/4 stars
PopMatters	6/10
USA Today	2.5/4 stars

Upon release, Ain't Nothin' Like Me received generally positive reviews from music critics. Andy Kellman from AllMusic wrote that "contemporary as ever, Joe seeks production and songwriting assistance from a number of ubiquitous heavyweights and up-and-comers [...] While a very basic name, a lack of flashiness, and sizeable gaps of inactivity have only gotten in the way of his popularity, Joe has maintained relevant and reliable since he debuted." Mark Edward Nero, writing for About.com, noted that Ain't Nothin' Like Me largely followed Joe's established formula of emotional ballads, sensual R&B, and rap collaborations, but concluded that the approach resulted in a solid album for longtime fans. Steve Jones of USA Today gave the album a two-and-a-half-star rating, praising the veteran singer's ability to navigate romantic themes with smooth vocals and emotional nuance. He noted that Joe was strongest when exploring vulnerability and personal struggles, though the album occasionally fell into familiar clichés.

Laura Checkoway from Vibe felt that the "album, though heavy on cheese, is surprisingly pleasant, especially as there is a deficit right now of true grown-man R&B. Joe stays young with A-list production and rap cameos." Less empathic Entertainment Weekly's Simon Vozick-Levinson wrote that the "album is most entertaining when New York City MCs like Nas and Papoose drop by for lively guest spots. Joe's solo ballads, however, make the disc's title seem like a cruel joke: His voice is consistently easy on the ears, sure, but contemporary R&B is full of also-rans who sound exactly like him." People magazine wrote that "the title of Joe's latest CD seems to attest to his singular abilities as a loveman. But on these slow jams and hip-hoppish midtempo numbers he doesn't sound much different from fellow R&B Romeos like R. Kelly ("Go Hard"), Brian McKnight ("Feel for You") and Usher ("Let's Just Do It")." The magazine rated the album two out of four stars. New York Times critic Kelfa Sanneh cited "Just Relax" and "Feel for You" as highlights and wrote: "Joe is best when he's whiny." DJ Booth gave the album four out of five spins.

== Commercial performance ==
Following its release, it debuted at number two on the US Billboard 200 and on top of the Top R&B/Hip Hop Albums chart, selling about 98,000 copies in its first week. It marked his highest-charting album since My Name Is Joe, which reached the same position of both charts. By July 2007, it had sold 224,823 copies in the United States.

== Track listing ==
Ain't Nothin' Like Me track listing
No.	Title	Writer(s)	Producer(s)	Length
1.	"Get to Know Me" (featuring Nas)	Joe L. Thomas; Sixto Diaz Rodriguez; Nasir Jones; Tim Kelley; Paul Mitchell; Bob Robinson	Tim & Bob	4:03
2.	"If I Was Your Man"	Tor Hermansen; Phillip Jackson; Mikkel Eriksen	Stargate	3:52
3.	"If I Want Her"	Ricky Lewis; Sean Garrett	Ric Rude; Garrett^{[a]}	3:50
4.	"Where You At" (featuring Papoose)	Warren Felder; Garrett	Oak; Garrett	4:15
5.	"My Love"	Gregory Gerard Curtis; Johnta Austin; Bryan Michael Cox	Cox; Curtis; Dean^{[a]}	4:04
6.	"Go Hard"	Cox; Austin; Kendrick Dean	Cox; Dean^{[a]}	3:39
7.	"Ain't Nothin' Like Me" (featuring Young Buck & Tony Yayo)	Harvey Mason, Jr.; David Brown; Marvin Bernard; Durrell Babbs; Steven L. Russell; Eric D. Dawkins; Antonio Dixon; Damon Thomas	The Underdogs; Tank	3:47
8.	"It's Me"	Hermansen; Jackson; Eriksen	Stargate	3:45
9.	"Let's Just Do It" (featuring Fabolous)	Marcello Valenzano; John Jackson; Andre Lyon	Cool & Dre	4:19
10.	"Feel for You"	Cox; Austin; Dean	Cox; Dean^{[a]}	4:06
11.	"Just Relax" (featuring Dre of Cool & Dre)	Malik Izaak Taylor; Ali Shaheed Muhammad; Kamaal Ibn John Fareed; Valenzano; Lyon	Cool & Dre; Mark Pitts^{[a]}	3:46
12.	"Love Is Just a Game"	Shannon Douglas Jones	Smith Bros.	3:16
13.	"You Should Know Me"	Michele Williams; Thomas; Jolyon W. Skinner	Cox; Thomas	5:15
14.	"Life of the Party"	Thomas; Skinner	Joshua Thompson; Thomas	4:30

Circuit City exclusive bonus
No.	Title	Writer(s)	Producer(s)	Length
15.	"That's What I Like"	Thomas; Kelley; Robinson	Tim & Bob	4:15

UK bonus track
No.	Title	Writer(s)	Producer(s)	Length
16.	"Run It Back"	Cox; Austin; Dean	Cox; Dean^{[a]}	4:34

Notes

- ^{^[a]} signifies a co-producer

Sampling credits

- "Get to Know Me" samples from "You're Da Man" by Nas and "Sugar Man" by Sixto Rodriguez.
- "Just Relax" contains samples from "Electric Relaxation" by A Tribe Called Quest & "Mystic Brew" by Ronald Foster.
- "Love Is Just a Game" samples from "I Do" by Boyz II Men.

== Charts ==
=== Weekly charts ===
Weekly chart performance for Ain't Nothin' Like Me
Chart (2007)	Peak position
French Albums (SNEP)	101
Dutch Albums (Album Top 100)	60
UK Albums (Official Charts)	25
UK R&B Albums (Official Charts)	2
US Billboard 200	2
US Top R&B/Hip-Hop Albums (Billboard)	1

=== Year-end charts ===
Year-end chart performance for Ain't Nothin' Like Me
Chart (2007)	Position
US Top R&B/Hip-Hop Albums (Billboard)	50
