= My Name Is Joe Thomas =

2016 album by Joe

Studio album by Joe
- Released: November 11, 2016
- Length: 61:03
- Label: Plaid Takeover; BMG
- Producer: Joe (also exec.); Gerald "Plaid" Isaac (exec.); Derek "D.O.A." Allen; Derek "D.O.A." Allen (ass.); Damo Farmer; Zach Crowell

Joe chronology
Bridges (2014)	My Name Is Joe Thomas (2016)

Singles from My Name Is Joe Thomas
- 1. "So I Can Have You Back" Released: 19 August 2016; 2. "Happy Hour" Released: January 2017; 3. "Lean Into It" Released: March 10, 2017; 4. "Don't Lock Me Out" Released: February 13, 2018; 5. "Lay You Down" Released: April 18, 2019

My Name Is Joe Thomas (stylized as #MYNAMEISJOETHOMAS) is the thirteenth studio album by American recording artist Joe. It was released on November 11, 2016 by Plaid Takeover and BMG Rights Management. Joe reteamed with longtime contributors, producer Derrick "D.O.A." Allen and Plaid Takeover head Gerald Isaac, to work on the majority of the album. A tribute to his third studio album My Name Is Joe (2000), Joe considered the project to become his final album by the time of its release.

My Name Is Joe Thomas received generally positive reviews from critics, some of which considered it to rank among Joe's best albums. The album debuted and peaked at number 17 on the US Billboard 200 and reached the top three on both the Top R&B/Hip-Hop Albums and the Independent Albums chart. In support of the album, several singles were issued, including "So I Can Have You Back," his fourth number-one his on Billboard's Adult R&B Songs chart, as well as the top 20 hit "Lean Into It."

== Background ==
In 2014, Joe released Bridges, his twelfth studio album and first project with Gerald Isaac's Plaid Takeover Entertainment after severing business ties with his longtime manager Kedar Massenburg. The album earned generally positive reviews from music critics and reached number 17 on the US Billboard 200, with first-week sales of 15,000 copies. A blueprint for all of his subsequent albums, Joe envisioned a follow-up to My Name Is Joe (2000), his biggest-selling album, to become his next project. Calling it "the 2.0 of My Name is Joe," Joe told in a 2016 interview: "My Name Is Joe Thomas is just music that's relatable and connecting to everyday life about love and relationships for both sides men and women and basically a reintroduction so to speak to one of my biggest albums to date My Name Is Joe. when people fell in love with music and actually bought music from record stores. I always reflect back to that 90’s era when people bought physical copies for the music, the artwork and to read the credits."

== Critical reception ==
Professional ratings
Review scores
Source	Rating
AllMusic	3.5/5 stars

Allmusic editor Andy Kellman gave the album three and a half out of five stars and found that while My Name Is Joe Thomas "has the appearance of a nostalgia trip, it isn't one. Recorded mostly with Derrick "D.O.A." Allen, Gerald Isaac, and Damo Farmer, it covers all his usual ground in inspired fashion, and like the earlier 2010s albums offers a diverse range of heartfelt, never oversold material." Referring to Joe's announcement that he was seriously considering retiring from music, Kellman concluded: "If this is truly it, Thomas figuratively and literally went out on a high note."

Also alluding to Joe's retirement statement, SoulTracks editor Melody Charles wrote: "Perhaps he feels that his thirteenth studio release, with good reason, is finally his career's personal best. What the sixteen tracks will demonstrate, beyond Joe's trademark finesse and sincerity, is his understated intensity and ease with a variety of styles and subject matter; Damo Farmer, Derrick "D.O.A." Allen and Gerald Issac anchor his explorations into both the familiar and unfamiliar [...] We can only hope, however, that My Name Is Joe Thomas is yet another intriguing episode in the series. Not its final encore."

== Commercial performance ==
Upon its release, My Name Is Joe Thomas debuted at number two Billboard's Top R&B/Hip-Hop Albums in the issue dated December 3, 2016, selling 17,000 copies in its first week, according to Nielsen Music. It marked his 16th career entry and 11th top five-placing set on the chart. The album also debuted at number 17 on the US Billboard 200 and launched at number one on the R&B Albums chart, his third album to do since 2013.

== Track listing ==
My Name Is Joe Thomas track listing
No.	Title	Writer(s)	Producer(s)	Length
1.	"Lean Into It"	Joe Thomas; Brandon Hodge; Jolyon Skinner; Derek "D.O.A." Allen; Gerald Isaac; Damien R. Farmer III	Allen; Farmer; Isaac	4:01
2.	"Don't Lock Me Out"	Thomas; Skinner; Isaac; Allen; Farmer; Joshua Thompson	Allen; Farmer; Isaac	3:48
3.	"Wear the Night"	Thomas; Skinner; Isaac; Allen	Allen; Isaac	3:20
4.	"So I Can Have You Back"	Isaac; Allen; Phillip "Taj" Jackson	Allen; Isaac	3:51
5.	"No Chance"	Isaac; Allen; Jackson; Farmer	Allen; Isaac	3:25
6.	"Happy Hour" (featuring Gucci Mane)	Thomas; Skinner; Isaac; Farmer; Radric Davis	Farmer; Isaac	4:25
7.	"Hollow"	Josh Hoge; Heather Morgan; Zach Crowell	Crowell	3:16
8.	"Hurricane"	Thomas; Skinner; Isaac; Allen; Farmer; Thompson	Allen; Farmer; Isaac	4:15
9.	"Can't Run From Love"	Edrick Miles; Isaac; Allen; Farmer	Allen; Farmer; Isaac	3:22
10.	"Tough Guy"	Isaac; Allen; Farmer	Allen; Farmer; Isaac	3:20
11.	"Lay You Down"	Thomas; Skinner; Isaac; Allen; Farmer	Allen; Farmer; Isaac	3:21
12.	"I Swear"	Thomas; Isaac; Allen; Farmer	Farmer; Isaac	3:34
13.	"Love Centric"	Thomas; Skinner; Isaac; Allen	Allen; Isaac	4:04
14.	"Celebrate You"	Thomas; Skinner; Isaac; Allen; Farmer	Allen; Farmer; Isaac	4:08
15.	"Our Anthem"	Jimmy Campbell; Reg Connelly; Harry M. Woods; Isaac; Allen	Allen; Isaac	3:55
16.	"Hello"	Adele Adkins; Greg Kurstin	Allen; Isaac	4:50
Total length:				61:03

Samples

- "Our Anthem" contains a sample of "Try a Little Tenderness", as performed by Otis Redding, and an interpolation of "Lift Every Voice And Sing" by James Weldon Johnson and "The Star-Spangled Banner" by Francis Scott Key.

== Charts ==
Weekly chart performance for My Name Is Joe Thomas
Chart (2016)	Peak position
US Billboard 200	17
US Independent Albums (Billboard)	3
US Top R&B/Hip-Hop Albums (Billboard)	2

== Release history ==
My Name Is Joe Thomas release history
Region	Date	Format	Label	Ref(s)
Various	November 4, 2016	CD; digital download; streaming	Plaid Takeover; BMG Rights Management	
