= The Good, the Bad, the Sexy =

The Good, The Bad, The Sexy

Studio album by Joe
- Released: October 18, 2011
- Length: 42:57
- Label: Kedar
- Producers: Joe (also exec.); Kedar Massenburg (exec.); The Ambassadorz; Brandon "B.A.M." Alexander; Brennan Gragston; Gerald Issac; Osinachi Nwaneri; Anthony L. Saunders

Joe chronology
| Signature (2009) | The Good, The Bad, The Sexy (2011) | Double Back: Evolution of R&B (2013) |

The Good, The Bad, The Sexy is the tenth studio album by American recording artist Joe. It was released by Kedar Entertainment on October 18, 2011. The album debuted at number eight on the US Billboard 200 and topped the Independent Albums chart.

== Background ==
"Gone Away", which leaked onto the internet in late July, was thought to be a track on the album, but according to Joe's Twitter on August 1, 2011 it is not. Joe said, "The Neptunes song that hit the net today IS me, but we recorded that a loooong time ago. Years ago. It will not be on the new album"

== Critical reception ==
Professional ratings
Review scores
| Source | Rating |
|---|---|
| About.com | 4/5 stars |
| AllMusic | 2.5/5 stars |
| The National | 3/5 stars |

AllMusic editor Andy Kellman rated the album two and a half stars ouf of five. He noted that "the album will not surprise anybody; it's very much a Joe album, based in soft-hued bedroom backdrops that, for the most part, crawl and slink without getting hotter than an occasional simmer. The Good, the Bad, the Sexy does not offer a retreat from Signature's carnal content." Reem Buhazza, writing for Abu Dhabi-based daily newspaper The National found that "the album's slow pace and the substandard production on some tracks could easily bore the more casual listener. But what the album lacks in musical variety and production polish, it makes up for with Joe's unmatched raw vocal talent and irresistible signature sound. Joe's grounded approach to R&B works in his favour on standout tracks."

=== Year-end lists ===
Year-end lists for The Good, the Bad, the Sexy
| Publication | Accolade | Rank | Ref. |
|---|---|---|---|
| SPIN | 20 Best R&B Albums of 2011 | 10 | |

== Commercial performance ==
The Good, the Bad, the Sexy debuted and peaked at number eight on the US Billboard 200 albums chart in the week of November 5, 2011, with first week sales of 33,000 copies. In addition, it also reached number two on the Top R&B/Hip Hop Albums chart, while also debuting atop Billboard's Independent Albums chart, becoming his second album to do so.

== Track listing ==
The Good, the Bad, the Sexy track listing
| No. | Title | Writer(s) | Producer(s) | Length |
|---|---|---|---|---|
| 1. | "Losing" | Andre Merritt | Osinachi Nwaneri | 3:34 |
| 2. | "Time of Your Life" | Joe Thomas; Aaron Sledge | Brandon "B.A.M." Alexander | 3:25 |
| 3. | "Almost There" | Bryan "BJ" Sledge; Aaron Sledge | B.A.M. | 4:18 |
| 4. | "Circles" | Gerald "Nasty Twin" Isaac; Brennan Gragston; Darnell Dalton; Lamar Taylor | Isaac; Gragston | 3:45 |
| 5. | "Pull My Hair" | Aaron Sledge | B.A.M. | 3:50 |
| 6. | "Dear Joe" | Michael "Big Mike" Harris | B.A.M. | 4:03 |
| 7. | "Slow Kisses" | Chris Echols | Nwaneri | 3:56 |
| 8. | "Lose Control" | Isaac; Gragston; Dalton; Taylor | Isaac; The Ambassadorz | 3:47 |
| 9. | "Tonight" | Anthony L. Saunders | Saunders | 3:41 |
| 10. | "Impossible" | Isaac; Dave Brown; Gragston; Dalton; Taylor | Isaac; The Ambassadorz | 4:19 |
| 11. | "Drink Up" | Isaac; Gragston; Dalton; Taylor | Isaac; The Ambassadorz | 4:14 |
| Total length: | | | | 42:57 |

Target bonus tracks
| No. | Title | Writer(s) | Producer(s) | Length |
|---|---|---|---|---|
| 12. | "Shelter" | | | 3:48 |
| 13. | "All That I Am" | Larry Lofton; Mattias Gustafsson | Joe; Edwin "Tony" Nicholas | 1:28 |
| 14. | "I Wanna Know" | Thomas; Joylon Skinner; Michele Williams | Joe; Nicholas; Timmy Allen | 1:36 |
| 15. | "All the Things" | Joe Thomas; Joshua Thompson; Michele Williams | Joe; Thompson | 1:59 |

== Charts ==
=== Weekly charts ===
Weekly chart performance for The Good, the Bad, the Sexy
| Chart (2011) | Peak position |
|---|---|
| US Billboard 200 | 8 |
| US Top R&B/Hip-Hop Albums (Billboard) | 2 |
| US Independent Albums (Billboard) | 1 |

=== Year-end charts ===
Year-end chart performance for The Good, the Bad, the Sexy
| Chart (2011) | Position |
|---|---|
| US Top R&B/Hip-Hop Albums (Billboard) | 87 |

== Release history ==
The Good, the Bad, the Sexy release history
| Region | Date | Format | Label | Ref(s) |
|---|---|---|---|---|
| Various | October 18, 2011 | CD; digital download | Kedar | |
