= E.R. (Emergency Room) =

Single by Joe

from the album Joe Thomas, New Man
- Released: July 15, 2008
- Length: 3:49
- Label: Kedar
- Songwriter(s): Dernst Emile II; Norquon "Fats" Greg; LaShawn Daniels
- Producer(s): D'Mile; Norquon "Fats" Greg

Joe singles chronology
"My Love" (2008)	"E.R. (Emergency Room)" (2008)	"Why Just Be Friends" (2008)

"E.R. (Emergency Room)" is a song by American R&B singer Joe. It was written by Dernst "D'Mile" Emile II, Norquon "Fats" Greg, and LaShawn Daniels for his seventh studio album Joe Thomas, New Man (2008), while production was helmed by D'Mile and Greg. Released as the album's lead single, it peaked at number 32 on the US Billboard Hot R&B/Hip-Hop Songs chart.

== Charts ==
Chart (2008)	Peak position
US Adult R&B Songs (Billboard)	7
US Hot R&B/Hip-Hop Songs (Billboard)	32
