= If I Was Your Man =

Single by Joe

from the album Ain't Nothin' Like Me
- Released: July 13, 2007
- Length: 3:52
- Songwriters: Mikkel Storleer Eriksen; Tor Erik Hermansen; Phillip Lamont Jackson
- Producer: Stargate

Joe singles chronology
"Where You At?" (2007)	"If I Was Your Man" (2007)	"My Love" (2007)

"If I Was Your Man" is a song by American recording artist Joe. It was written by Mikkel Storleer Eriksen and Tor Erik Hermansen along with Phillip Lamont Jackson for his sixth studio album Ain't Nothin' Like Me (2007), with production handled by the former two for Stargate. The contemporary R&B ballad was selected as the album's second single and released to US radios on July 13, 2007. It peaked at number 84 on the Billboard Hot 100 and reached the top-20 of the Hot R&B/Hip-Hop Songs chart.

== Commercial performance ==
Selected as the album's second single, "If I Was Your Man" peaked at number 84 on the US Billboard Hot 100 and reached the top twenty of the Hot R&B/Hip-Hop Songs chart, peaking at number 19. The song also reached number three on Billboard's Adult R&B Songs chart, becoming Joe's highest-charting single since "What If a Woman" (2002).

== Music video ==
The song's accompanying music video, directed by Ron Krauss, features a cameo appearance by actor Blair Underwood and was inspired by the ending scene of the film Casablanca as his love interest leaves Joe for the man in the plane.

== Credits and personnel ==
- Jim Caruana – recording engineer
- Mikkel Storleer Eriksen – producer, writer
- Tor Erik Hermansen – producer, writer
- Jon Houghkirk – mixing assistance
- Phillip Lamont Jackson – writer
- Phil Tan – mixing engineer
- Joe Thomas – vocals
- Doug Wilson – recording engineer

== Charts ==
=== Weekly charts ===
Weekly chart performance for "If I Was Your Man"
Chart (2007)	Peak position
US Adult R&B Songs (Billboard)	3
US Billboard Hot 100	84
US Hot R&B/Hip-Hop Songs (Billboard)	19

=== Year-end charts ===
Year-end chart performance for "If I Was Your Man"
Chart (2007)	Position
US Hot R&B/Hip-Hop Songs (Billboard)	47
