= Everything (Joe album) =

Studio album by Joe
- Released: August 17, 1993
- Length: 52:21
- Label: Mercury
- Producer: Joe; J. Dibbs; Dave "Jam" Hall

Joe chronology
Everything (1993)	All That I Am (1997)

Singles from Everything
- 1. "I'm in Luv" Released: July 13, 1993; 2. "The One for Me" Released: November 16, 1993; 3. "All or Nothing" Released: February 22, 1994

Everything is the debut studio album by American singer Joe. It was released by Polygram Records on August 17, 1993, in the United States. Produced by Joe along with Keith Miller, J. Dibbs, and Dave "Jam" Hall, it peaked at number 105 on the US Billboard 200 and number 16 on Billboard's Top R&B/Hip-Hop Albums. Everything spawned three singles, including "I'm in Luv", "The One for Me", and "All or Nothing". "I'm in Luv" rose to number one on the R&B charts, and "All or Nothing" was a top ten hit on the same charts.

== Track listing ==
Everything track listing
No.	Title	Lyrics	Music	Producer(s)	Length
1.	"The One for Me"	Joe; Denvil Tracey Gerrell	Keith Miller	Joe; Miller^{[a]}	4:39
2.	"I'm in Luv"	J. Dibbs	J. Dibbs; Brian Allen	J. Dibbs; E-Smoove^{[b]}	3:48
3.	"All or Nothing"	Joe; Gerrell	Miller	Joe; Miller^{[a]}	5:10
4.	"It's Alright"	Joe; Bill Irving	Joe; Miller	Joe; Miller^{[a]}	5:26
5.	"If Loving You Is Wrong"	Joe; Gerrell	Joe	Joe; Miller^{[a]}	4:22
6.	"What's on Your Mind"	Joe; Gerrell	Joe	Joe; Miller^{[a]}	3:32
7.	"Finally Back"	Joe; Derrick Nichols	Joe; Miller	Joe; Miller^{[a]}	4:02
8.	"Get a Little Closer"	Joe; Gerrell	Joe; Miller	Joe; Miller^{[a]}	5:27
9.	"I Can Do It Right"	Joe; Gerrell	Joe; Miller	Joe; Miller^{[a]}	5:16
10.	"Everything"	Joe	Joe	Joe	5:26
11.	"Baby Don't Stop"	Joe; Gerrell; Dave "Jam" Hall	Hall	Hall	5:13
Total length:					52:21

Bonus track
No.	Title	Lyrics	Music	Producer(s)	Length
12.	"Do Me"	Joe; Miller	Hall	Hall	4:55

Notes

- ^{^[a]} signifies a co-producer
- ^{^[b]} signifies an additional producer

== Charts ==
Weekly chart performance for Everything
Chart (1993)	Peak position
Australian Albums (ARIA)	160
UK Albums (OCC)	53
US Billboard 200	105
US Top R&B/Hip-Hop Albums (Billboard)	16
