= Love & Sex, Pt. 2 =

Single by Joe featuring Kelly Rowland

from the album Bridges
- Released: March 4, 2014
- Recorded: 2013
- Genre: R&B
- Length: 3:46
- Label: Plaid Takeover
- Songwriters: Alvin Garrett; Derek Allen; Gerald Isaac
- Producer: Derek "D.O.A." Allen

Joe singles chronology
"Love & Sex" (2013)	"Love & Sex, Pt. 2" (2014)	"If You Lose Her" (2015)

Kelly Rowland singles chronology
"Dirty Laundry" (2013)	"Love & Sex, Pt. 2" (2014)	"Say Yes" (2014)

"Love & Sex, Pt. 2" is a song by American recording artist Joe, featuring guest vocals from singer Kelly Rowland. Originally recorded by Joe and fellow R&B singer Fantasia Barrino for his tenth album Doubleback: Evolution of R&B (2013), a re-arranged version of the song, featuring a new instrumentation and vocals by Rowland, was included on Joe's follow-up album Bridges (2014). Written by Alvin Garrett, Gerald Isaac, and Derek "D.O.A." Allen, with production helmed by the latter, it was released as the lead single from the Bridges album. It reached the top five on the US Billboard Adult R&B Songs chart.

== Music video ==
A music video to accompany the release of "Love & Sex, Pt. 2" was directed by Billie Woodruff.

== Track listing ==
Digital download
No.	Title	Length
1.	"Love & Sex, Pt. 2" (featuring Kelly Rowland)	3:46

== Charts ==
Chart (2014)	Peak position
US Adult R&B Songs (Billboard)	5
US R&B/Hip-Hop Airplay (Billboard)	33

== Release history ==
Region	Date	Format	Label
United States	March 4, 2014	Digital download	Plaid Takeover LLC
