= Better Days (Joe album) =

Studio album by Joe
- Released: December 11, 2001
- Studio: Various: Head Up Recording (New Jersey); Right Track Studios (New York City); MasterSounds Studios (Virginia Beach, Virginia); Compass Point Studios (Bahamas); Electric Lady Studios (New York City); Tallest Tree Studio (New Jersey); Sound On Sound Studios (New York City)
- Length: 54:17
- Label: Jive
- Producer: Joe (also exec.); Kedar Massenburg (exec.); Allen "Allstar" Gordon; The Neptunes

Joe chronology
My Name Is Joe (2000)	Better Days (2001)	And Then... (2003)

Singles from Better Days
- 1. "Let's Stay Home Tonight" Released: June 1, 2001; 2. "What If a Woman" Released: February 19, 2002; 3. "Isn't This the World" Released: April 23, 2002

Better Days is the fourth studio album by American R&B singer Joe. It was released by Jive Records on December 11, 2001, in the United States. The album reached number 32 on the US Billboard 200 and number four on the Top R&B/Hip-Hop Albums chart. It spawned three singles, including "Lets Stay Home Tonight", which reached number 18 on the US R&B chart; "What If a Woman", which reached number 13 on the US R&B chart, and "Isn't This the World". Better Days became Joe's second album to receive a Grammy Award nomination in the Best R&B Album category, while "Let's Stay Home Tonight" was nominated for the Grammy Award for Best Male R&B Vocal Performance. On August 7, 2002, a Japanese limited version of the album was released together with "Joe Video Collection: I Wanna Know and More Video" content, named "Better Days & The Video Collection".

== Background ==
In a 2001 interview with Billboard, Joe disclosed that Better Day was inspired by a conversation that he had with a journalist overseas. He said: "We were talking about the state of R&B music. He thought that it was too risqué and that it didn't have much substance, R&B music needs to have a growth process."

== Critical reception ==
Professional ratings
Review scores
Source	Rating
AllMusic	3/5 stars
The Guardian	1/5 stars
MTV Asia	5/10
Vibe	3.5/5 stars

AllMusic's Jason Birchmeier praised "Let's Stay Home Tonight" and "Ghetto Child" as highlights and Joe for carrying the record, but was critical of the track listing repeating various "songwriting techniques" and love story "motifs", concluding that "if you're looking for a few quality singles rather than a consistent album, you should find this to be an engaging album, even if its rushed and ultimately thin on original ideas." Vibe contributor Dimitri Ehrlich gave praise to Joe's musical inventiveness in utilizing instrumentation, "lyrical wit" and telling stories from a woman's perspective, concluding with: "Better Days is mostly a one-man show, a nice surprise in an era when few artists seem brave enough to resist all-star guests."

Billboard found that Joe "takes a message-oriented stance on Better Days" which "showcases the singer's sociopolitical side [...] A balance of positivity and soul, Better Days is the deft work of a true career artist – one who knows what it means to grow and evolve." In a negative review, Dorian Lynskey from The Guardian wrote: "This is everyman R&B, a little like Craig David minus the pop pizzazz, a little like D'Angelo without the sexual heat, but mostly thuddingly dull. Even the guest stars succumb to Joe's tractor beam of tedium [...] only the CD booklet, in which Joe poses thoughtfully in expensive jackets, provides some fun, albeit of the unintentionally comic variety." Reeta Sidhu from MTV Asia argued that "sadly, Better Days doesn't hold up alongside Joe's previous albums."

== Chart performance ==
The album debuted and peaked at number 32 on the US Billboard 200 in the week ending December 29, 2001. A considerable drop from his previous effort My Name Is Joe (2000) which had opened at number two on the chart, it was eventually certified gold by the Recording Industry Association of America (RIAA) on April 11, 2002. By that time, Better Days had sold 510,000 units in the US, according to Nielsen SoundScan.

== Track listing ==
Better Days track listing
No.	Title	Writer(s)	Producer(s)	Length
1.	"Let's Stay Home Tonight"	Allen "Allstar" Gordon; Joel Campbell; Johnta Austin	Joe; Gordon; Campbell^{[a]}	3:26
2.	"Better Days"	Joe Thomas; Joshua P. Thompson; Rickey Slaughter; Quincy Patrick; Stan Vincent	Joe	4:31
3.	"What If a Woman"	Thomas; Skinner; Gordon	Joe; Gordon; Campbell^{[a]}	4:14
4.	"Alone"	Thomas; Skinner; Gordon; Campbell	Joe; Gordon; Campbell^{[a]}	4:34
5.	"Isn't This the World"	Chad Hugo; Pharrell Williams; John Williams	The Neptunes	3:54
6.	"Ghetto Child" (featuring Shaggy)	Thomas; Skinner; Tonyatta P. Martinez; Gasner Allen Hughes	Joe	4:12
7.	"I Like Sexy Girls"	Thomas; Skinner; Gordon	Joe; Gordon; Campbell^{[a]}	4:00
8.	"Here She Comes"	Thomas; Skinner; Gordon; Stephen Jones; Daryl Hall; John Oates; Sara Allen	Joe; Gordon; Campbell^{[a]}	2:54
9.	"Lover's Prayer"	Thomas; Skinner	Joe	4:02
10.	"Changed Man"	Thomas; Thompson; Slaughter	Joe	4:16
11.	"I Understand"	Thomas; Skinner	Joe	3:47
12.	"She Used 2 Luv Me"	Thomas; Skinner; Gordon; Campbell	Joe; Gordon; Campbell^{[a]}	3:23
13.	"World of Girls"	Thomas; Skinner	Joe	3:09
14.	"Let's Stay Home Tonight (Remix)" (featuring Petey Pablo)	Austin; Campbell; Gordon; Moses Barrett	Joe; Gordon	3:55
Total length:				54:17

Japan/Australia bonus track
No.	Title	Writer(s)	Producer(s)	Length
15.	"It Won't End"	Dyshon Collins; Jack Knight; Michael Jones; Steve Esteverne	Joe; Esteverne	4:00

Australia bonus tracks
No.	Title	Writer(s)	Producer(s)	Length
16.	"What If a Women" (Smoove 5 Remix Edit)	Thomas; Skinner; Gordon	Joe; Gordon; Campbell^{[a]}; Ricky Smoove^{[b]}; Phase 5^{[b]}	3:45
17.	"I Wanna Know" (The Roni Remix)	Thomas; Skinner; Michele Williams	Joe; Edwin "Tony" Nicholas; Timmy Allen^{[a]}; Gordon^{[b]}	4:37

Notes

- ^{^[a]} signifies additional producer(s)
- ^{^[b]} signifies remix producer(s)

Sample credits

- "Better Days" contains a portion of "O-o-h Child" written by Stan Vincent, performed by the Five Stairsteps.
- "Isn't This the World" contains portions of "Theme from Close Encounters of the Third Kind" by John Williams.
- "Here She Comes" contains a portion of "Maneater" written by Daryl Hall, John Oates and Sara Allen, performed by Hall & Oates.

== Personnel ==
Credits adapted from the liner notes of Better Days.

Musicians

- Marlene Rice – violin (1, 2, 11)
- Nioka Workman – cello (1, 2, 11)
- Judith Insell-Staack – viola (1, 2, 11)
- Hart Hollman and The Motown Romance Orchestra – orchestra (6)
- The Lord's Church Children's Cathedral Choir – choir (6)

Production

- Andy Brooks – assistant engineer (1, 4, 7, 8, 12)
- Steef Van DeGevel – assistant engineer (2, 3, 9, 10, 11, 13)
- Tim Roberts – assistant engineer (5)
- Tony Flores – assistant engineer (6)
- Allen "Allstar" Gordon – mixing (1, 4, 7, 8, 12)
- Andy Blakelock – mixing (1, 4, 7, 8, 12)
- Stephen George – mixing (2, 3, 9, 10, 11, 13)
- Serban Ghenea – mixing (5)
- Peter Mokran – mixing (6)
- Tom Coyne – mastering (Sterling Sound)

Imagery

- Denise Trotman – art direction and design
- Jonathan Mannion – photography
- Wendall Haskins – stylist
- Andrea Richter – grooming

== Charts ==
=== Weekly charts ===
Weekly chart performance for Better Days
Chart (2001–02)	Peak position
Australian Albums (ARIA)	84
Dutch Albums (Album Top 100)	41
French Albums (SNEP)	96
UK Albums (OCC)	87
UK R&B Albums (OCC)	15
US Billboard 200	32
US Top R&B/Hip-Hop Albums (Billboard)	3

=== Year-end charts ===
2001 year-end chart performance for Better Days
Chart (2001)	Position
Canadian R&B Albums (Nielsen SoundScan)	119

2002 year-end chart performance for Better Days
Chart (2002)	Position
Canadian R&B Albums (Nielsen SoundScan)	115
US Billboard 200	129
US Top R&B/Hip-Hop Albums (Billboard)	35

== Certifications ==
Certifications and sales for Better Days
Region	Certification	Certified units/sales
United Kingdom (BPI)	Silver	60,000^{*}
United States (RIAA)	Gold	510,000
^{*} Sales figures based on certification alone.

== Release history ==
Better Days release history
Region	Date	Format(s)	Edition(s)	Label	Ref.
United States	December 11, 2001	CD; digital download	Standard	Jive	
Japan	August 7, 2002	CD; DVD	Better Days & The Video Collection	Jive	
