= The One for Me =

Single by Joe

from the album Everything
- Released: November 16, 1993
- Genre: R&B; new jack swing
- Length: 4:39
- Label: Polygram
- Songwriters: Joe Thomas; Denvil Tracey Gerrell; Keith Miller
- Producers: Joe; Keith Miller

Joe singles chronology
"I'm in Luv" (1993)	"The One for Me" (1993)	"All or Nothing" (1994)

Music video
- "The One for Me" on YouTube

"The One for Me" is a song by American R&B singer Joe. It was written by Joe, Denvil Tracey Gerrell, and Keith Miller for his debut studio album, Everything (1993), while production was helmed by Joe, featuring co-production from Miller. Released in November 1993 by Polygram Records as the album's second single, it reached number 39 on the US Billboard Hot R&B/Hip-Hop Songs chart, while peaking at number 34 on the UK Singles Chart.

== Critical reception ==
Upon the release of the single, pan-European magazine Music & Media wrote, "Swingbeat has still not really been accepted in Europe, maybe because the rhythm is often more important than the melody. The chorus to this track is the exception. It could do the trick." James Hamilton from the Record Mirror Dance Update named it a "huskily wailed funky strong jackswing roller" in his weekly dance column.

== Track listings ==
CD maxi single
No.	Title	Length
1.	"The One for Me" (The West End Radio Edit)	3:56
2.	"The One for Me" (LP Version)	4:39
3.	"The One for Me" (SDA's Freestyle Edit)	5:43
4.	"I'm in Luv" (Ghetto Lab Mix)	5:30

== Credits and personnel ==
- Denvil Tracey Gerrell – writer
- Keith Miller – producer, writer
- Special Tee – mixing
- Adam Kudzin - Audio engineer
- Joe Thomas – producer, vocals, writer

== Charts ==
Chart (1993–94)	Peak position
Australia (ARIA)	164
UK Singles (OCC)	34
UK Club Chart (Music Week)	19
US Adult R&B Songs (Billboard)	25
US Hot R&B/Hip-Hop Songs (Billboard)	39
