= So I Can Have You Back =

Single by Joe

from the album My Name Is Joe Thomas
- Released: August 19, 2016
- Length: 3:51
- Label: Plaid Takeover; BMG
- Songwriters: Gerald Isaac; Derek "D.O.A." Allen; Phillip "Taj" Jackson
- Producers: Allen; Isaac

Joe singles chronology
"Love & Sex, Pt. 2" (2014)	"So I Can Have You Back" (2016)	"Happy Hour" (2017)

"So I Can Have You Back" is a song by American singer Joe. It was written by Gerald Isaac, Derek "D.O.A." Allen, and Phillip "Taj" Jackson for his twelfth studio album My Name Is Joe Thomas (2016), while production was helmed by Isaac and Allen. Released as the album's lead single, it peaked at number one on the US Billboard Adult R&B Songs chart, becoming his fourth single to do so.

== Music video ==
A music video for "So I Can Have You Back" was directed by Plaid Wayne.

== Charts ==
Chart performance for "So I Can Have You Back"
Chart (2016–17)	Peak position
US Adult R&B Songs (Billboard)	1
US R&B/Hip-Hop Airplay (Billboard)	21

== Release history ==
List of releases of "So I Can Have You Back"
Region	Date	Format	Label	Ref.
United States	August 19, 2016	Digital download	Plaid Takeover LLC	
