= And Then... =

Studio album by Joe
- Released: December 2, 2003
- Length: 51:31
- Label: Jive
- Producer: Joe (also exec.); Kedar Massenburg (exec.); Kevin "Shekspere" Briggs; Carvin & Ivan; Dre & Vidal; Allen "Allstar" Gordon; Roy "Royalty" Hamilton; R. Kelly; L.E.S.; Neil da Real; Frank Romano; Johnnie "Smurf" Smith; The Underdogs

Joe chronology
Better Days (2001)	And Then... (2003)	Ain't Nothin' Like Me (2007)

Singles from And Then...
- 1. "More & More" Released: September 8, 2003; 2. "Ride wit U" Released: March 8, 2004

And Then... is the fifth studio album by American recording artist Joe. It was released through Jive Records on December 2, 2003, in the United States. A breakaway from his previous album Better Days (2001), the album saw Joe consulting a wider range of collaborators, including labelmate R. Kelly as well as Frank Romano, Roy "Royalty" Hamilton, L.E.S., Kevin "Shekspere" Briggs, Dre & Vidal, Carvin & Ivan and The Underdogs. Rap group G-Unit and rapper Freeway appear as guest vocalists on the album.

The album earned generally lukewarm reviews from music critics who called it solid if not overly exceptional. It debuted and peaked number 26 on the US Billboard 200 chart, selling 121,000 copies in its first week of release, and was eventually certified gold by the Recording Industry Association of America (RIAA). And Then... produced two singles, including US lead single "More & More" and international lead single "Ride wit U" the latter of which reached the top 20 on the UK Singles Chart.

== Background ==
And Then... is an album that focuses on ballads. Joe states on his web site that he prefers singing ballads to up-tempo tracks. "I prefer to sing on ballads rather than up-tempos. You kind of showcase yourself as an r&b singer a lot better." The album also features a number of collaborations with prominent r&b writers and producers. Joe worked with labelmate R. Kelly on the lead single "More & More" and "Make You My Baby", these two songs were originally intended for R. Kelly's unreleased album "Loveland". Roy "Royalty" Hamilton worked with Joe on the title track, as well as "Sweeter than Sugar" and "Sweet Dreams". Songwriter Kevin "Shekspere" Briggs wrote the song "Bedroom" that appears late on the album. G-Unit appears on the track "Ride wit U". Produced by Frank Romano, which is one of the up-tempo tracks on the album — Joe returned the favour on their debut album.

== Promotion ==
"More & More," written and produced by label mate R. Kelly, was released as the album's lead single in the United States. It peaked at number 48 on the US Billboard Hot 100 and reached number 15 on Billboard's Hot R&B/Hip-Hop Songs chart. Elsewhere, the song was released on double A-single with "Ride wit U" featuring rap group G-Unit. It peaked at number 22 on the Hot R&B/Hip-Hop Songs and also reached number 12 on the UK Singles Chart and the top forty of the Australian Singles Chart, becoming his highest-charting single release since 2000's "Stutter". Third single "Priceless," produced by The Underdogs, reached number 72 on the Hot R&B/Hip-Hop Songs chart.

== Critical reception ==
Professional ratings
Review scores
Source	Rating
AllMusic	3.5/5 stars
The Morning Call	3/5 stars
Vibe	3/5 stars

Upon release, And Then... received generally lukewarm reviews from music critics. New York Times critic Jon Pareles found that "with his light but precise tenor voice, Joe applies bends and quavers to every note that can withstand them, and like Mr. Kelly, he can sound oddly mournful as he's proclaiming his undying love and happiness. The production stays understated, mostly using down-tempo drum machines and sleek keyboards. Joe's ambitions don't extend far beyond the bedroom (and the garage that holds all the cars he mentions). He's not a utopian yearner like Musiq Soulchild, just a guy on the make. But his limited ambitions are easier to achieve."

AllMusic wrote that "Joe maintains his steady recording output with And Then..., another in a line of his generally solid if not overly exceptional albums highlighted by a couple standout cuts [...] Here he's in really good hands, especially on the aforementioned Kelly and Hamilton songs, which rank among the very best of his career. They rated the album three and a half stars out of five. Billboard wrote: "Enlisting Kelly and other guest producers, Joe undercuts the consistency critique leveled at last year's Better Days. There are still a few formulaic and trite bumps along the way [...] Those missteps are outpaced by several noteworthy tracks." Dennis Kelly from The Morning Call found that "after his biggest album, 2000's My Name Is Joe, he seemed to lose his way a bit on the followup, 2001's Better Days. Now with And Then… [...] he's back to his slow jam ways [...] that best suit Joe's soft, sentimental delivery, which should suit his fans just fine."

== Commercial success ==
And Then... debuted at number 26 on the US Billboard 200 and number four on Billboard's Top R&B/Hip-Hop Albums chart, selling 121,000 copies during which what Billboard described as "a busy holiday retail season." It was eventually certified gold by the Recording Industry Association of America (RIAA) on September 23, 2004. Outside the United States, the album reached the top thirty on the Dutch MegaCharts. In the United Kingdom, And Then... reached number 73 on the UK Albums Chart and was certified gold by British Phonographic Industry (BPI) on July 22, 2013.

== Track listing ==
And Then... track listing
No.	Title	Writer(s)	Producer(s)	Length
1.	"Sweeter Than Sugar"	Ernest E. Dixon; Roy "Royalty" Hamilton; Curtis Mayfield	Hamilton	3:38
2.	"And Then..."	Dixon; Hamilton	Hamilton	3:26
3.	"More & More"	Robert Kelly	R. Kelly	3:43
4.	"Ride Wit U" (featuring G-Unit)	Ivan Barias; David Brown; Carvin Haggins; Curtis Jackson; Christopher Lloyd; Frank Romano; James Rayshawn Smith	Frankie "Vegas" Romano; Carvin & Ivan^{[a]}	4:11
5.	"Priceless"	Damon Thomas; Harvey Mason, Jr.; Eric Dawkins; Antonio Dixon	The Underdogs	4:35
6.	"Jeep"	Joe Thomas; Dixon; Allen "Allstar" Gordon; Charmelle Cofield	Joe; Gordon	4:35
7.	"You Dropped Your Dime"	Leshan Lewis; Dixon	L.E.S.; Neil da Real	3:53
8.	"Make You My Baby"	Kelly	R. Kelly	3:41
9.	"Street Dreams"	Tupac Shakur; Hamilton; Tyruss Himes; James P. Pennington; Nasir Jones; David A. Stewart; Annie Lennox; Jean Claude Olivier; Samuel J. Barnes; Johnny Jackson; Dixo	Hamilton	2:50
10.	"It Ain't Like That"	Joe; Skinner; Gordon	Joe; Gordon	4:23
11.	"Another Used to Be"	Barias; Haggins; Johnnie Smith; James Rayshawn Smith	Carvin & Ivan; Johnnie "Smurf" Smith^{[a]}	4:59
12.	"Bedroom"	Joe; Skinner; Kevin "She'kspere" Briggs	Briggs	3:31
13.	"Testify"	Barias; Haggins; Troy Corbin; Romano	Carvin & Ivan	4:07
Total length:				51:31

Bonus tracks
No.	Title	Writer(s)	Producer(s)	Length
14.	"Hey Mami"	Joe; Dixon; Gordon	Joe; Gordon	3:58
15.	"I Remember" (featuring Freeway)	Thomas; Andre Harris; Vidal Davis; Leslie Pridgen	Dre & Vidal	4:12

Notes

- ^{^[a]} signifies a co-producer

Sampling credits

- "Sweeter Than Sugar" contains a sample from "The Makings of You" by Gladys Knight & The Pips.
- "Street Dreams" samples from "Never Gonna Stop" by Linda Clifford, "Street Dreams" by Nas, and "All Eyez on Me" by 2Pac.

== Charts ==
=== Weekly charts ===
Weekly chart performance for And Then...
Chart (2003)	Peak position
Australian Albums (ARIA)	130
Dutch Albums (Album Top 100)	28
French Albums (SNEP)	108
German Albums (Offizielle Top 100)	90
UK Albums (OCC)	73
UK R&B Albums (OCC)	14
US Billboard 200	26
US Top R&B/Hip-Hop Albums (Billboard)	4

=== Year-end charts ===
Year-end chart performance for And Then...
Chart (2004)	Position
US Billboard 200	169
US Top R&B/Hip-Hop Albums (Billboard)	37

== Certifications ==
Certifications and sales for And Then...
Region	Certification	Certified units/sales
United Kingdom (BPI)	Silver	60,000^{*}
United States (RIAA)	Gold	500,000^{^}
^{*} Sales figures based on certification alone.^{^} Shipments figures based on certification alone.
