= Doubleback: Evolution of R&B =

Studio album by Joe
- Released: July 2, 2013
- Length: 48:48
- Label: Massenburg
- Producer: Joe (also exec.); Kedar Massenburg (exec.); Gerald Isaac (ass. exec.); Derek "D.O.A." Allen; The Ambassadorz; Martin K; Stargate

Joe chronology
The Good, the Bad, the Sexy (2011)	Doubleback: Evolution of R&B (2013)	Bridges (2014)

Singles from Doubleback: Evolution of R&B
- 1. "I'd Rather Have a Love" Released: February 26, 2013; 2. "Love & Sex" Released: October 8, 2013

Doubleback: Evolution of R&B is the eleventh studio album by American singer Joe. It was released through Massenburg Media on July 2, 2013 in the United States. His debut with the label, following the dissolution of his former record company, the album incorporates classic rhythm and blues influences and features bits and pieces from 1970s' funk and soul. Joe produced half of the album, while Derek "D.O.A." Allen, The Ambassadorz, and production duo Stargate were consulted to contribute additional material.

The album earned generally positive reviews from music critics, some of whom called it one of Joe's finer album projects, with some criticizing the sameness of the songs. Doubleback: Evolution of R&B debuted at number six on the US Billboard 200, with first sales of 61,000 copies. It also debuted atop the Top R&B Albums and the Independent Albums charts. The album was preceded by lead single "I'd Rather Have a Love," a top five hit on the Adult R&B Songs chart.

== Background ==
Doubleback: Evolution of R&B will be the first release from Kedar Massenburg's newly formed company Massenburg Media after the dissolution of his former label Kedar Entertainment. Speaking of its title, he told YouKnowIGotSoul.com, that he felt "like today when you look at r&b music, it's almost like a shadow. We are sort of behind the scenes looking at everything else unfold. I want to inspire today’s generation to want to become r&b artists and to want to pick up an instrument. Either a piano, guitar, drums, whatever the case may be. To bring that classic old school sound to the fore front. If it was younger people doing it the way Marvin Gaye was doing it, Barry White was doing it, Stevie Wonder, Tina Turner [...] If you love singing and this style of r&b, just incorporate it into what you do, that's what makes things more beautiful." The singer worked with a small group of musicians on the album, including San Francisco-based producer D.O.A., who contributed “I'd Rather Have a Love” and the duet “Love & Sex”. Singer Fantasia appears on the latter, while rapper Fat Joe recorded vocals for the remix of “I'd Rather Have a Love”, which is included as a bonus track on the Best Buy track listing of the album. Rapper Too Short also appears on the album.

== Promotion ==
The first single to be lifted from the album was “I’d Rather Have a Love”. Commenting on its release, Joe stated, that it "certainly represents my style and flavor [...] It has that really romantic element to it. It also speaks a lot of guys in a relationship that have a good thing going on but sometimes you know how we are. We forget what we have and we treat things a little differently. This is just a reminder basically, “I’d rather have love than nothing at all”. Who wants to be alone? It’s a great song."

== Critical reception ==
Professional ratings
Review scores
Source	Rating
AllMusic	3.5/5 stars
Herald Tribune	B
PopMatters	6/10
USA Today	3/4 stars

AllMusic editor Andy Kellman called Doubleback: Evolution of R&B "one of Joe's finer 2000s/2010s releases" and wrote that the album was "a little less salacious than 2009's Signature and 2011's The Good, the Bad, the Sexy, with classier elements that reach a Philly soul-evoking peak on "Love & Sex"." PopMatters critic Elias Leight noted that the album "comes filled with bits and pieces of soul and funk from the ’70s, or ’90s interpolations of that ’70s sound" that "relies on thick rhythm parts, while guitars carry the melody, and dashes of strings season the pot."

Steve Jones from USA Today found that Joe "takes a simple but effective approach on his tenth album. He uses live instrumentation and polished storytelling to explore different facets of relationships. The soulful vocals and inviting grooves show his passion is still there." Herald Tribune critic Gerry Galipault noted that on Doubleback: Evolution of R&B the "R&B crooner continues to show his vocal prowess, whether it's slow-tempo or upbeat. The only real complaint is the sameness of the songs." Justin Kantor from SoulTracks called the "a harmoniously flowing ride driven by pure melodies, mindful words, and markedly expressive vocal performances."

== Commercial performance ==
Doubleback: Evolution of R&B debuted and peaked at number six on the US Billboard 200 albums chart on the week of July 20, 2013, with first week sales of 31,000 copies. The album marked Joe's tenth top ten entry on the chart. In addition, it also reached number four on the Top R&B/Hip Hop Albums chart, while also debuting atop Billboard's Independent Albums chart, becoming his fourth album to do so.

== Track listing ==
Doubleback: Evolution of R&B track listing
No.	Title	Writer(s)	Producer(s)	Length
1.	"Something for You"	Joe Thomas	Joe	3:44
2.	"Easy"	Gerald Issac; Derek "D.O.A." Allen; Alvin Garrett	Allen	3:58
3.	"Baby"	Joe Thomas	Joe	4:17
4.	"Compromise"	Philip "Taj" Jackson; Jawan Hill; Martin Kleveland; Tor-Erik Hermansen; Mikkel Storleer Eriksen	Stargate; Martin K	3:47
5.	"Magic City"	Thomas	Joe	3:46
6.	"I'd Rather Have a Love"	Issac; Allen; Garrett	Allen	3:45
7.	"Love & Sex" (featuring Fantasia)	Issac; Allen; Garrett	Issac; Allen	4:43
8.	"Sexy"	Thomas	Joe	4:18
9.	"More"	Issac; Darnell Dalton; Lamar Taylor; Eric Crawford; Richard Castro, Jr.	The Ambassadorz; Allen	3:46
10.	"Mary Jane"	Thomas	Joe	3:56
11.	"1 to 1 Ratio" (featuring Too Short)	Issac; Allen; Garrett; Todd Shaw	Allen	4:26
12.	"DoubleBack"	Thomas; Joshua P. Thompson; Jolyon Skinner	Joe	4:22
Total length:				48:48

Best Buy bonus track
No.	Title	Writer(s)	Producer(s)	Length
13.	"I'd Rather Have a Love (Remix)" (featuring Fat Joe)	Issac; Allen; Garrett; Joseph Cartagena	Allen	4:10

Target bonus tracks
No.	Title	Writer(s)	Producer(s)	Length
13.	"Walk Away"	Thomas	Joe	3:50
14.	"Smoove"	Thomas	Joe; Allen	3:50

== Charts ==
=== Weekly charts ===
Weekly chart performance for Doubleback: Evolution of R&B
Chart (2013)	Peak position
US Billboard 200	6
US Top R&B/Hip-Hop Albums (Billboard)	4
US Independent Albums (Billboard)	1

=== Year-end charts ===
Year-end chart performance for Doubleback: Evolution of R&B
Chart (2013)	Position
US Top R&B/Hip-Hop Albums (Billboard)	63

== Release history ==
Doubleback: Evolution of R&B release history
Region	Date	Format	Label	Ref(s)
Various	July 2, 2013	CD; digital download	Massenburg Media	
