= Where You At (Joe song) =

Single by Joe featuring Papoose

from the album Ain't Nothin' Like Me
- Released: June 13, 2006
- Length: 4:16
- Label: Jive
- Songwriter(s): Sean Garrett; Warren Felder
- Producer(s): Oak; Sean Garrett

Joe singles chronology
"Priceless" (2004)	"Where You At" (2006)	"If I Was Your Man" (2007)

"Where You At" is a song by American recording artist Joe. The mid-tempo R&B track was written and produced by Warren "Oak" Felder and Sean Garrett for his sixth studio album Ain't Nothin' Like Me (2007) and features guest vocals by rapper Papoose. Released as the album's lead single, it reached number 79 on the US Hot R&B/Hip-Hop Songs chart and number 92 on the UK Singles Chart.

== Music video ==
A music video for "Where You At" was directed by Bille Woodruff.

== Track listing ==
Digital download

1. "Where You At" (Main Version; featuring Papoose) – 4:16
2. "Where You At" (Instrumental; featuring Papoose) – 4:08

== Charts ==
Weekly chart performance for "Where You At"
Chart (2007)	Peak position
UK Singles (OCC)	92
US Hot R&B/Hip-Hop Songs (Billboard)	79
