= I'm in Luv =

Single by Joe

from the album Everything
- Released: July 13, 1993
- Studio: Battery Studios
- Genre: R&B; new jack swing
- Length: 4:37
- Label: Polygram
- Songwriters: Darren Jenkins; Teddy Denslow; Brian Allen
- Producer: J. Dibbs

Joe singles chronology
"I'm in Luv" (1993)	"The One for Me" (1993)

Music video
- "I'm in Luv" on YouTube

"I'm in Luv" is a song by American R&B singer Joe, released in July 1993, by Polygram Records. It was written by Darren "J. Dibbs" Jenkins, Teddy Denslow, and Brian Allen for his debut studio album, Everything (1993), while production was overseen by the former. Serving as his debut single, "I'm in Luv" reached numbers 64 and 62 on the US Billboard Hot 100 and Cash Box Top 100. It also peaked at number ten on the Billboard Hot R&B/Hip-Hop Songs chart, while peaking at number 22 on the UK Singles Chart. The accompanying music video was directed by Lori-Jean Kreussling of GPA Film.

== Critical reception ==
Alan Jones from Music Week gave the song a score of three out of five, writing, "A popular item on import for some time finally released here, and an impressive soul/swing debut from the 20-year-old Georgian, who has already played a handful of dates here. Not mega, but a hit." Pan-European magazine Music & Media commented, "When a "swing beatle" pleads his love, you can be sure that it happens in the most passionate rhythm imaginable. For lovers with endurance."

== Track listings ==
CD maxi single (US edition)
No.	Title	Length
1.	"I'm in Luv" (LP Version; featuring Brown Man)	3:47
2.	"I'm in Luv" (Edit; featuring Brown Man)	3:58
3.	"I'm in Luv" (E-Smoove Radio Edit W/O Rap)	3:36
4.	"I'm in Luv" (Extended Remix; featuring Brown Man)	4:37
5.	"I'm in Luv" (E-Smoove Raw Edit; featuring Brown Man)	4:17

CD maxi single (UK edition)
No.	Title	Length
1.	"I'm in Luv" (Album Version; featuring Brown Man)	3:47
2.	"I'm in Luv" (Ghetto Lab Mix; featuring Darkman)	5:30
3.	"I'm in Luv" (You Know Who the Fuck Joe Is)	3:52
4.	"I'm in Luv" (Powerlab Edit)	5:30

== Credits and personnel ==
- Brian Allen – writer
- Teddy Denslow – writer
- Darren "J. Dibbs" Jenkins – producer, writer
- Adam Kudzin - recording engineer - audio engineer
- Special Tee – mixing
- Joe Thomas – vocals

== Charts ==
=== Weekly charts ===
Chart (1993–94)	Peak position
Australia (ARIA)	144
Europe (Eurochart Hot 100)	69
Europe (European Dance Radio)	12
UK Singles (OCC)	22
UK Airplay (Music Week)	21
UK Dance (Music Week)	3
UK Club Chart (Music Week)	89
US Billboard Hot 100	64
US Dance Club Songs (Billboard)	6
US Dance Singles Sales (Billboard)	38
US Hot R&B/Hip-Hop Songs (Billboard)	10
US Cash Box Top 100	62

=== Year-end charts ===
Chart (1993)	Position
US Hot R&B/Hip-Hop Songs (Billboard)	65
