= Joe Thomas, New Man =

Studio album by Joe
- Released: September 23, 2008
- Length: 50:07
- Label: Kedar
- Producers: Joe (also exec.); Kedar Massenburg (exec.); Bryan-Michael Cox; D'Mile; Jerry Flowers; Jared Lee Gosselin; Norquon Greg; Rodney Jerkins; Micayle McKinney; Stereotypes; WyldCard

Joe chronology
Ain't Nothin' Like Me (2007)	Joe Thomas, New Man (2008)	Greatest Hits (2008)

Singles from Joe Thomas, New Man
- 1. "E.R. (Emergency Room)" Released: July 15, 2008; 2. "Why Just Be Friends" Released: July 30, 2008

Joe Thomas, New Man is the seventh album by American recording artist Joe, released on September 23, 2008 in the United States. It marked his debut on longtime collaborator Kedar Massenburg's independent record label Kedar Entertainment, following his split with Jive Records in 2007. Joe reteamed with previous collaborators Bryan-Michael Cox, WyldCard, and Rodney "Darkchild" Jerkins to work on the album, while additional production was provided by Jerry "Fatz" Flowers, D'Mile and production team Stereotypes.

Critical reception towards Joe Thomas, New Man was generally mixed. The album debuted at number eight on the US Billboard 200 albums chart, and reached the top of the Independent Albums chart, selling 54,000 copies in its first week of release. Target carried a special edition of Joe Thomas, New Man, including the songs "Triple Black Room", "I Will Again" and "Approach". The album was preceded by lead single "E.R. (Emergency Room)" which reached the top ten of Billboard Adult R&B Songs chart.

== Background ==
In April 2007, following several delays, Joe released his sixth studio album Ain't Nothin' Like Me. It received generally positive reviews from music critics and debuted at number two on the US Billboard 200 and on top of the Top R&B/Hip Hop Albums chart, selling about 98,000 copies in its first week. The album marked his highest-charting album since My Name Is Joe (2000), which reached the same position of both charts. Soon after, Joe left longtime record company Jive Records to sign with Kedar Massenburg's independent record label Kedar Entertainment and resumed work on his seventh studio album. Set to have contributions from Nas, The Game, Busta Rhymes, Mario, Trey Songz, Snoop Dogg and P. Diddy, production on Joe Thomas, New Man was eventually helmed by Bryan-Michael Cox, Stereotypes, Mack Mckinney and D'Mile, among others.

== Critical reception ==
Professional ratings
Review scores
Source	Rating
About.com	3.5/5 stars
AllMusic	3/5 stars

Upon release, Joe Thomas, New Man received generally mixed to positive reviews from music critics. Thomas Inskeep from AllMusic gave the album three stars out of five and wrote that "on his seventh album, R&B crooner Joe keeps doing what he's always done best: sings sexy, woman-centric midtempo jams. There are no dramatic change-ups here – much as the likes of Barry White, Teddy Pendergrass, and Keith Sweat before him, Joe's not even trying to cross over to any audience other than adult black women [...] The best thing about Joe Thomas, New Man is its consistency, which it's got in spades. Mark Edward Nero, writing for About.com, remarked that "And although his latest album is called Joe Thomas, New Man, this is for the most part the same singer whose music women have gone wild over for more than a decade. What's different though, is that Joe sounds rejuvenated on this album [...] To be honest, there's not a whole lot of new ground covered on the album, but Joe's the type of artist who doesn't need to reinvent himself to be or stay successful."

== Commercial performance ==
Joe Thomas, New Man debuted at number eight on the US Billboard 200 albums chart on the week of September 29, 2008. 54,000 copies were sold in the first week. In addition, it also charted on top of Billboard's Independent Albums chart, while reaching the top three on the Top R&B/Hip Hop Albums chart. In its second week on the charts, sales increased, with 112,725 copies sold. The first single, "E.R. (Emergency Room)" was released on July 15, 2008 and the second single, "Why Just Be Friends" was released on July 30.

== Track listing ==
Joe Thomas, New Man track listing
No.	Title	Writer(s)	Producer(s)	Length
1.	"E.R. (Emergency Room)"	Dernst Emile II; Norquon "Fats" Greg; LaShawn Daniels	D'Mile; Norquon "Fats" Greg	3:49
2.	"By Any Means"	Bryan-Michael Cox; Johnta Austin	Cox	3:51
3.	"Why Just Be Friends"	Emanuel Chisholm; Eric King Jr.; Micayle McKinney; Jeremy Reeves; Ray Romulus; Jonathan Yip	McKinney; The Stereotypes	4:23
4.	"We Need to Roll"	Cox; Austin; Kendrick Dean	Cox; WyldCard	4:05
5.	"Man in Your Life"	Cox; Austin	Cox	3:16
6.	"I Won't Let Him Hurt You"	Cox; Austin	Cox	4:14
7.	"New Man"	Reeves; Romulus; Yip	The Stereotypes	3:47
8.	"Start Over Again"	Cory Antwone; Jerry "Fatz" Flowers	Flowers	4:38
9.	"Sorry"	Antwone; Flowers	Flowers	3:36
10.	"Heart Behind My Eyes"	Antwone; Flowers	Flowers	3:42
11.	"Chameleon"	Alex Cantrell; Phillip "Whitey" White; Jared Lee Gosselin	Gosselin	3:47

Japan bonus tracks
No.	Title	Writer(s)	Producer(s)	Length
12.	"Heavy"	Rodney Jerkins	Jerkins	3:49
13.	"We Need to Roll (Remix)" (featuring Mario Dewar Barrett & Trey Songz)	Cox; Austin; Dean	Cox; WyldCard	4:09
14.	"Man in Your Life (Remix)" (featuring The Game)	Cox; Austin	Cox	3:57
15.	"Triple Black Room (Remix)" (featuring Diddy)	Jerkins; Daniels	Jerkins; Daniels	4:09

Snippets from Signature
No.	Title	Writer(s)	Producer(s)	Length
12.	"Friends Don't Let Friends"	Thomas; Jolyon Skinner; Joshua P. Thompson; Tonyatta Martinez	Joe; Thompson	1:27
13.	"Special Friends"	Thomas; Thompson	Joe; Thompson	1:25
14.	"Magic"	Thomas	Joe	1:25
15.	"Sex Girl"	Thomas; Alex "MackMan" Mack	Joe	1:14
16.	"Wanna Be Your Lover"	Thomas	Joe	1:24

Deluxe edition
No.	Title	Writer(s)	Producer(s)	Length
1.	"E.R. (Emergency Room)"	Emile; Greg; Daniels	D'Mile; Greg	3:49
2.	"By Any Means"	Cox; Austin	Cox	3:51
3.	"Why Just Be Friends"	Chisholm; King; McKinney; Reeves; Romulus; Yip	McKinney; The Stereotypes	4:23
4.	"We Need to Roll"	Cox; Austin; Dean	Cox; WyldCard	4:05
5.	"Man In Your Life"	Cox; Austin	Cox	3:58
6.	"I Won't Let Him Hurt You"	Cox; Austin	Cox	4:14
7.	"New Man"	Reeves; Romulus; Yip	The Stereotypes	3:47
8.	"Start Over Again"	Antwone; Flowers	Flowers	4:38
9.	"Approach"	Thomas	Joe	3:35
10.	"Sorry"	Antwone; Flowers	Flowers	3:36
11.	"Heart Behind My Eyes"	Antwone; Flowers	Flowers	3:42
12.	"Chameleon"	Cantrell; White; Gosselin	Gosselin	3:47
13.	"I Will Again"	Thomas	Joe	4:14
14.	"Triple Black Room"	Jerkins; Daniels	Jerkins; Daniels	3:39
15.	"Friends Don't Let Friends"	Thomas; Skinner; Thompson; Martinez	Joe; Thompson	1:27
16.	"Special Friends"	Thomas; Thompson	Joe; Thompson	1:25
17.	"Magic"	Thomas	Joe	1:25
18.	"Sex Girl"	Thomas; Mack	Joe	1:14
19.	"Wanna Be Your Lover"	Thomas	Joe	1:24

== Charts ==
=== Weekly charts ===
Weekly chart performance for Joe Thomas, New Man
Chart (2008)	Peak position
UK Albums (Official Charts)	90
UK R&B Albums (Official Charts)	11
US Billboard 200	8
US Top R&B/Hip-Hop Albums (Billboard)	3
US Independent Albums (Billboard)	1

=== Year-end charts ===
Year-end chart performance for Joe Thomas, New Man
Chart (2008)	Position
US Top R&B/Hip-Hop Albums (Billboard)	67

== Release history ==
Joe Thomas, New Man release history
Region	Date	Format	Edition(s)	Label	Ref(s)
Various	September 23, 2008	CD; Digital download	Standard	Kedar	
Various	November 25, 2008	CD; Digital download	Deluxe	Kedar	
