= What If a Woman =

Single by Joe

from the album Better Days
- Released: February 19, 2002
- Genre: R&B
- Length: 4:14
- Label: Jive
- Songwriters: Joe Thomas; Joylon Skinner; Allen Gordon
- Producers: Joe; Allen "Allstar" Gordon; Joel Campbell

Joe singles chronology
"Let's Stay Home Tonight" (2001)	"What If a Woman" (2002)	"Isn't This the World" (2002)

"What If a Woman" is a song by American R&B singer Joe. It was written by Joe, Joylon Skinner, and Allen "Allstar" Gordon for his fourth studio album Better Days (2001), while production as helmed by Joe and Gordon, with Joel Campbell providing additional production. Released as the album's second single, the song reached number 63 on the US Billboard Hot 100 and number 21 on the Hot R&B/Hip-Hop Songs chart.

== Charts ==
=== Weekly charts ===
Chart (2002)	Peak position
UK Singles (OCC)	53
UK Hip Hop/R&B (OCC)	9
US Billboard Hot 100	63
US Adult R&B Songs (Billboard)	1
US Hot R&B/Hip-Hop Songs (Billboard)	21

=== Year-end charts ===
Chart (2002)	Position
US Hot R&B/Hip-Hop Songs (Billboard)	65
