= Ride wit U =

2004 single by Joe

Single by Joe featuring G-Unit

from the album And Then...
- Released: March 8, 2004
- Length: 4:11
- Label: Jive
- Songwriters: Ivan Barias, Carvin Haggins, Frank Romano, James Rayshawn Smith, Christopher Lloyd, David Brown
- Producers: Frankie "Vegas" Romano, Carvin & Ivan

Joe singles chronology
"Wanna Get to Know You" (2004)	"Ride wit U" (2004)	"Priceless" (2004)

G-Unit singles chronology
"Wanna Get to Know You" (2004)	"Ride wit U" (2004)	"Smile" (2004)

"Ride wit U" is a song by American singer Joe from his fifth studio album, And Then... (2003). The track was produced by Frankie "Vegas" Romano and co-produced by production duo Carvin & Ivan. The song features guest vocals by rap group G-Unit.

Released as the album's second single in the United States and first international single along with "More & More", "Ride wit U" reached number 12 on the UK Singles Chart, number 22 on the Billboard Hot R&B/Hip-Hop Singles & Tracks chart, and number 32 on the Australian Singles Chart, becoming Joe's highest-charting single release since 2000's "Stutter".

== Track listing ==
Digital EP

1. "Ride wit U" (main version featuring G-Unit) – 4:10
2. "Ride wit U" (no rap) – 3:32
3. "Ride wit U" (instrumental) – 4:08
4. "More & More" – 3:44

== Credits and personnel ==
Credits are adapted from the liner notes of And Then....

- Songwriting – Ivan Barias, Carvin Haggins, Frank Romano, James Rayshawn Smith, Christopher Lloyd, David Brown
- Production – Frankie "Vegas" Romano
- Co-production – Carvin & Ivan
- Vocal production – Carvin Haggins
- Arrangement – Jayshawn Champion
- Piano – Jon Denney
- Recording – Brian Garten, Frank "X" Sutton, Frankie Romano, Mike Wilson
- Mixing – Serban Ghenea
- Mixing assistance - Tim Roberts
- Mastering - Herb Powers Jr.

== Charts ==
=== Weekly charts ===
"Ride wit U"

Chart (2004)	Peak position
Belgium (Ultratip Bubbling Under Flanders)	3
Belgium (Ultratip Bubbling Under Wallonia)	10
CIS Airplay (TopHit)	152
Netherlands (Dutch Top 40 Tipparade)	12
Romania (Romanian Top 100)	88
US Billboard Hot 100	56
US Hot R&B/Hip-Hop Songs (Billboard)	22
US Rhythmic Airplay (Billboard)	28

"Ride wit U" / "More & More"

Chart (2004)	Peak position
Australia (ARIA)	32
Australian Urban (ARIA)	12
Germany (GfK)	62
Ireland (IRMA)	43
Netherlands (Single Top 100)	85
Scotland Singles (OCC)	26
UK Singles (OCC)	12
UK Hip Hop/R&B (OCC)	4

=== Year-end charts ===
Chart (2004)	Position
UK Singles (OCC)	182
UK Urban (Music Week)	21

== Release history ==
Region	Date	Format(s)	Label(s)	Ref.
United States	March 8, 2004	Urban radio	Jive	
United Kingdom	April 12, 2004	CD	Jive	
Australia	July 5, 2004	CD	Jive	
