= More & More (Joe song) =

2003 single by Joe

Single by Joe

from the album And Then...
- Released: September 8, 2003
- Genre: R&B
- Length: 3:46
- Label: Jive
- Songwriter(s): R. Kelly
- Producer(s): R. Kelly

Joe singles chronology
"Isn't This The World" (2001)	"More & More" (2003)	"Wanna Get to Know You" (2004)

"More & More" is a song by American recording artist Joe. It was written and produced by R. Kelly for Joe's fifth studio album And Then... (2003). Picked as the album's lead single, the contemporary R&B ballad was released in September 2003 in the United States and reached number 15 on Billboard's Hot R&B/Hip-Hop Songs chart. Outside the US, "More & More" was released on a double A-single along with "Ride wit U", which served as the album's first international single.

== Critical reception ==
In their review of And Then..., Vibe called the song "absolutely ravishing. 'More & More' is a languidly erotic blend of lubricious come-ons."

== Charts ==
All non-US entries charted with "Ride wit U".

=== Weekly charts ===
Chart (2003–2004)	Peak position
Australia (ARIA)	32
Germany (GfK)	62
Ireland (IRMA)	43
Netherlands (Single Top 100)	85
Scotland (OCC)	26
UK Singles (OCC)	12
UK Hip Hop/R&B (OCC)	4
US Billboard Hot 100	48
US Hot R&B/Hip-Hop Songs (Billboard)	15

=== Year-end charts ===
Chart (2004)	Position
US Hot R&B/Hip-Hop Singles & Tracks (Billboard)	58

== Release history ==
Region	Date	Format(s)	Label(s)	Ref.
United States	September 8, 2003	Urban radio	Jive	
United States	September 29, 2003	Urban AC radio	Jive	
United Kingdom	April 12, 2004	CD	Jive	
Australia	July 5, 2004	CD	Jive	
