= Let's Stay Home Tonight (song) =

Single by Joe

from the album Better Days
- Released: June 1, 2001
- Genre: R&B
- Length: 3:26
- Label: Jive
- Songwriter(s): Johnta Austin; Joel Campbell; Allen Gordon; Marvin Gaye; Odell Brown; David Ritz
- Producer(s): Allen "Allstar" Gordon; Joel Campbell

Joe singles chronology
"Stutter" (2000)	"Let's Stay Home Tonight" (2001)	"What If a Woman" (2002)

"Let's Stay Home Tonight" is a song by American R&B singer Joe. It was written by Johnta Austin, Joel Campbell, and Allen "Allstar" Gordon for his fourth studio album Better Days (2001). Gordon served as the song's producer, with Campbell providing additional production. Released as the album's lead single only twelve months after the success of his number-one single "Stutter", "Let's Stay Home Tonight" underperformed on the charts, reaching number 68 on the US Billboard Hot 100 and number 18 on the Hot R&B/Hip-Hop Songs chart in December 2001, becoming Joe's lowest-charting lead single up to that point.

The song heavily interpolates Sexual Healing by Marvin Gaye.

== Charts ==
=== Weekly charts ===
Chart (2001–2002)	Peak position
Australia (ARIA)	72
Scotland (OCC)	81
UK Singles (OCC)	29
UK Hip Hop/R&B (OCC)	8
US Billboard Hot 100	68
US Adult R&B Songs (Billboard)	5
US Hot R&B/Hip-Hop Songs (Billboard)	18

=== Year-end charts ===
Chart (2002)	Position
UK Urban (Music Week)	36
US Hot R&B/Hip-Hop Songs (Billboard)	83
