= Joe (singer) =

American contemporary R&B singer (born 1973)

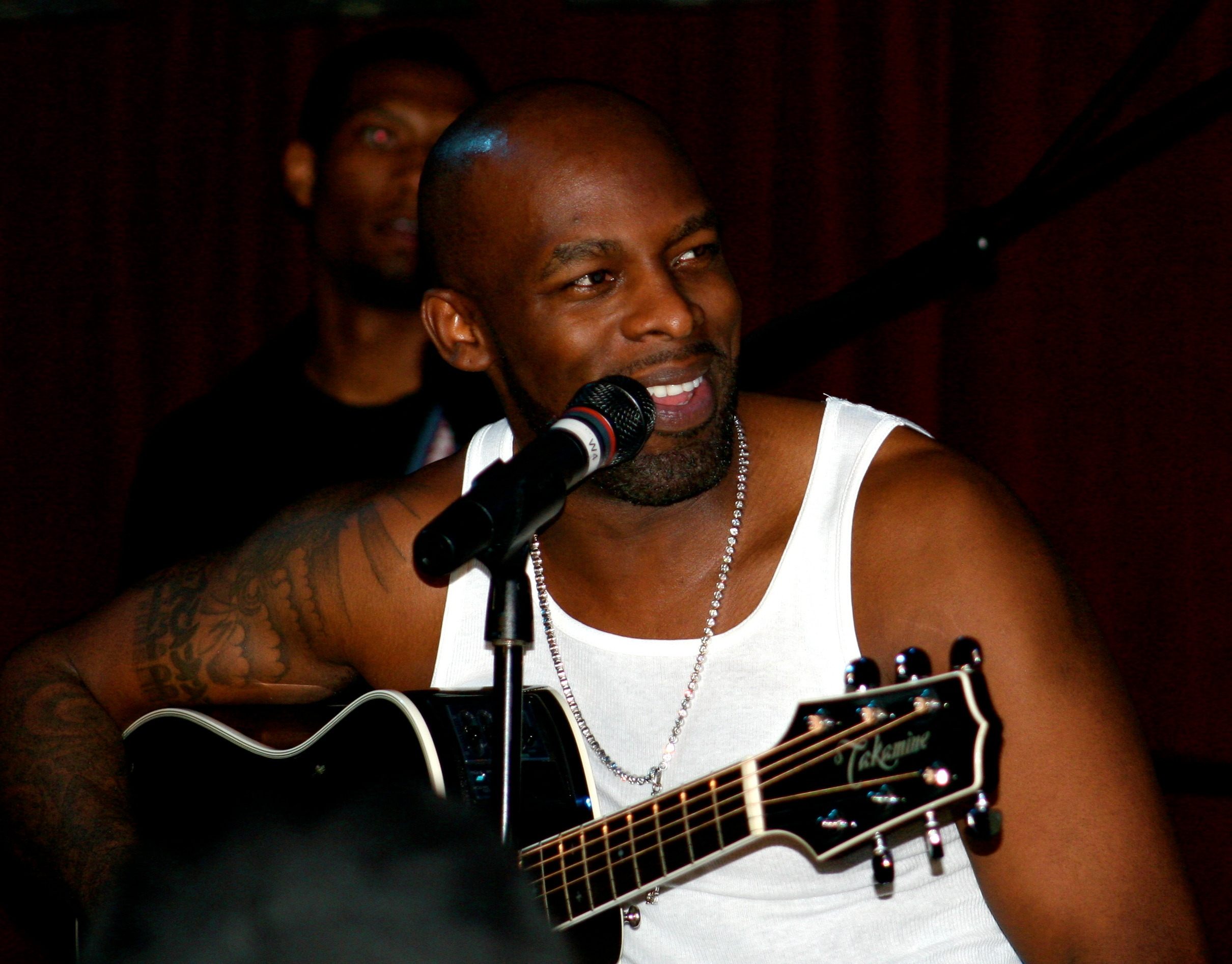
- Joe performing in 2011

Background information
- Born: Joseph Lewis Thomas; July 5, 1973 (age 53); Columbus, Georgia, U.S.
- Origin: Opelika, Alabama, U.S.
- Genre: R&B
- Occupations: Singer; songwriter; record producer
- Works: Discography
- Years active: 1992–present
- Labels: Plaid Takeover; BMG; Massenburg Media; Kedar; 563; Island; Jive; PolyGram; Mercury

Joseph Lewis Thomas (born July 5, 1973), known mononymously as Joe, is an American contemporary R&B singer. He signed to Polygram Records in 1992, and rose to prominence after releasing his debut album Everything the following year. He followed it with a series of successful albums under Jive Records, including All That I Am (1997), the international bestseller My Name Is Joe (2000) as well as the multi-certified albums Better Days (2001) and And Then... (2003). Several songs from these albums became hit singles on the pop and R&B record charts, including the number-one hit "Stutter", the top-ten entries "All the Things (Your Man Won't Do)", "Don't Wanna Be a Player", and "I Wanna Know" as well as his collaborations "Faded Pictures" and "Thank God I Found You", the latter of which he performed alongside Mariah Carey, also a number-one hit, and "Still Not a Player".

Since his departure from Jive, Joe has released most of his projects independently through ventures with Kedar Massenburg and Plaid Takeover Entertainment. In 2016, his twelfth album My Name Is Joe Thomas became his eleventh album to score a top five-placing on Billboard's Top R&B/Hip-Hop Albums chart, while lead single "So I Can Have You Back" became his fourth number-one hit on the Adult R&B Songs chart over the span of three consecutive decades (1990s, 2000s, and 2010s). In 2010, Billboard listed Joe at 48th on its list of the Top 50 R&B and Hip Hop Artists of the past 25 years. An ASCAP Award recipient for his song "I Wanna Know", Joe is a seven-time Grammy Award nominee and has been nominated for numerous other awards and accolades, including a BET Award, an NAACP Image Award, and four Soul Train Music Awards.

== Early life ==
Joe was born July 5, 1973, in Columbus, Georgia, and was the child of evangelist preachers. He moved to Opelika, Alabama during his formative years and graduated from Opelika High School in 1991.

== Career ==
=== 1992–1999: Early career ===
After his graduation from Opelika High School, Joe continued to sing and write music while working at occasional temporary jobs. In New Jersey, while working at a gospel record store and continuing his music education through a local church, he met producer Vincent Herbert and recorded a three-song demo tape. In 1992, he signed to PolyGram Records and released his debut album Everything the next year. Produced by Joe along with Keith Mille, J. Dibbs, and Dave "Jam" Hall, it peaked at number 105 on the US Billboard 200 and number 16 on Billboard's Top R&B/Hip-Hop Albums. Everything spawned three singles, including I'm in Luv" and "The One for Me" the former of which became a top ten hit on the Hot R&B/Hip-Hop Songs chart and peaked at number 22 on the UK Singles Chart. The following year, Joe appeared in the group Black Men United, along with then-label mate Brian McKnight, Gerald Levert, Aaron Hall, Tevin Campbell and other male singers for the single "U Will Know" for the soundtrack to the romantic drama film, Jason's Lyric.

In 1996, Joe contributed the song "All the Things (Your Man Won't Do)" to the soundtrack to the crime comedy parody film Don't Be a Menace to South Central While Drinking Your Juice in the Hood (1996). Released as a single, it reached number 11 on the US Billboard Hot 100 and was later included as the opening track on his second studio album All That I Am (1997) after signing with Jive Records. Marking his commercial breakthrough, the album reached number 13 on the US Billboard 200 and number 4 on Billboard Top R&B/Hip-Hop Albums chart. Another hit single from the album "Don't Wanna Be a Player", was also featured on the Booty Call soundtrack. All That I Am eventually went platinum in the US.

A songwriter and producer, Joe became a frequent collaborator on other artist's projects in the mid-1990s. He remixed a duet by Barry White and Tina Turner called "In Your Wildest Dreams" as well as a remix of Turner's single "Something Beautiful Remains" from Turner's album Wildest Dreams (1996) and wrote and produced on albums by R&B groups Ideal, Xscape and Hi-Five. In addition, Joe sang on the remix of Big Punisher's "Still Not a Player", produced by Knobody, which interpolated his own song "Don't Wanna Be a Player" and appeared as a backing vocalist on Brandy's track "Angel in Disguise" from her second album, Never Say Never (1998). In 1999, singer Mariah Carey asked him to sing on her track "Thank God I Found You" which appeared on her album Rainbow (1999). Released as the album's second single, it became Joe's first number-one single on the US Billboard Hot 100 and was later certified Gold by the Recording Industry Association of America (RIAA). Aside from its peak of number two in Canada, the song achieved moderate international charting, reaching the top ten in the United Kingdom and peaking within the top thirty in Australia, Belgium (Wallonia), France, Germany, the Netherlands, and Switzerland.

=== 2000–2007: Rise to success ===
In April 2000, Joe released his third album, My Name Is Joe. Produced by Joe and several other record producers such as Kevin "She'kspere" Briggs, Teddy Riley and Tim & Bob, it received favorable reviews from critics and peaked at number two on the Billboard 200, while topping the Top R&B/Hip-Hop Albums chart. It charted internationally as well, peaking within the top 10 in Netherlands and Canada. My Name Is Joe produced three singles, including "I Wanna Know", "Treat Her Like a Lady", and "Stutter", the first and last of which reached the top five of the US Billboard Hot 100. The biggest seller of his discography, My Name Is Joe was certified triple-platinum by the Recording Industry Association of America (RIAA), and earned platinum and silver certifications from Music Canada, Syndicat National de l'Édition Phonographique (SNEP), and the British Phonographic Industry (BPI). In 2001, the album and "I Wanna Know" received Grammy Award nominations in the Best R&B Album and Best Male R&B Vocal Performance categories.

The following year, Better Days, Joe's fourth album, was released. Significantly less successful, it reached number 32 on the Billboard 200 but peaked at number four on the Top R&B/Hip-Hop Albums chart, reaching gold status in the US. The album spawned two singles, "Let's Stay Home Tonight", which reached number 18 on the Hot R&B/Hip-Hop Songs chart, and the Adult R&B Songs chart-topper "What If a Woman". A critical success, Better Days became his second album to receive a Grammy nomination in the Best R&B Album category, while "Let's Stay Home Tonight" was nominated for Best Male R&B Vocal Performance. In 2002, Joe did another collaboration with Mariah Carey on the remix version of "Through the Rain", the first single from her album Charmbracelet (2002).

Joe recruited a diverse roster of high-profile musicians to work with him on his fifth studio album, including Carvin & Ivan, Dre & Vidal, R. Kelly, and The Underdogs. Released in late 2003, And Then... reached number 26 on the US Billboard 200. While Kelly-penned lead single "More & More" became a top 20 R&B in the US, it was released on double A-side with "Ride Wit U", a collaboration with rap group G-Unit, elsewhere. A moderate success, the single entered Australia's top 40 in July 2004, and peaked at number 12 on the UK Singles Chart, becoming one if his biggest hits there. A steady seller, And Then... was eventually certified gold by the Recording Industry Association of America (RIAA).

Joe's sixth album Ain't Nothin' Like Me, released in April 2007, was produced by Stargate, Tank, Cool & Dre, Bryan-Michael Cox, and Sean Garrett and featured guest appearances by rappers Nas, Fabolous, Papoose, Young Buck and Tony Yayo. It received generally positive reviews from music critics and debuted at number two on the US Billboard 200 and on top of the Top R&B/Hip Hop Albums chart, selling about 98,000 copies in its first week, while marking his highest-charting album since My Name Is Joe. While lead single "Where You At" charted in the United Kingdom only, follow-up "If I Was Your Man" reached number three on Billboard's Adult R&B Songs. Ain't Nothin' Like Me marked Joe's final album with Jive Records following a fallout with label surrounding rumors of his dissatisfaction with the promotion of his material. Also in 2007, Joe performed a cover version of "Before He Cheats", a Carrie Underwood hit, as a Pepsi Smash exclusive on Yahoo! Music.

=== 2008–present: Independent releases ===
Following his departure from Jive Records, Joe released his seventh album Joe Thomas, New Man independently on record label executive Kedar Massenburg's Kedar Entertainment company in September 2008. Production on the album was helmed by Bryan-Michael Cox, Stereotypes, and D'Mile among others. Upon release, it debuted at number eight on the US Billboard 200, selling 56,733 copies in its first week. Lead single "E.R. (Emergency Room)" became the only single to reach the top forty on Billboard's Hot R&B/Hip-Hop Songs chart. Only ten months later, Signature, his second album with Kedar, was released. An album composed of ballads written, produced, and arranged by Joe, it debuted at number seven on the Billboard 200 and number two on the Top R&B/Hip-Hop Albums chart. The same year, Joe released the holidays EP Make Sure You're Home for Christmas, which was released exclusively through Target and features two original songs and four cover versions of Christmas standards and carols. A top twenty success on the Top R&B/Hip-Hop Albums chart, the standalone EP was worked into a full-length album, entitled Home Is the Essence of Christmas, released the following year.

In 2010, Joe collaborated with label mate Keith Sweat on the song "Test Drive", written for Sweat's album Ridin' Solo. Also in 2010, he released his ninth studio The Good, the Bad, the Sexy. The singer worked with Brandon "B.A.M." Alexander, Gragston, The Ambassadorz, and Gerald Issac on most of the record which debuted at number eight on the Billboard 200 and number two on the Hot R&B/Hip Hop albums chart. Following a short hiatus, Joe's next effort, his tenth studio album Doubleback: Evolution of R&B, was released in July 2013, marking his first release on Massenburg's newly formed company Massenburg Media after the dissolution of his Kedar Entertainment.In 2014 he also collaborated with 50 cent on the song „Big rich town“ the intro song for 50 cents hit series Power. It debuted at number six on the Billboard 200 and number one on the R&B/Hip Hop chart, selling 31,500 copies in its first week. The singer worked with a small group of musicians on the album, including San Francisco-based producer D.O.A., who contributed "I'd Rather Have a Love" and the duet "Love & Sex", featuring singer Fantasia. Rapper Too Short also appears on the album.

In March 2014, Joe signed a distribution deal with BMG Rights Management. His eleventh album, Bridges, marked his first album under Plaid Takeover Entertainment, a venture of regular co-executive producer Gerald Isaac, after severing business ties with Massenburg. After a decade of consecutive top ten entries on the Billboard 200, it debuted and peaked at number 17, with first-week sales of 15,126 copies in the United States. The first single released from the album was "Love & Sex, Pt. 2", a duet with singer Kelly Rowland serving as sequel to his 2013 collaboration with Fantasia. It became a top five hit on the Adult R&B Songs chart. In November 2015, Joe recorded and released a cover to the critically acclaimed song Hello by artist Adele, which received mostly positive reviews. Joe's twelfth album, My Name Is Joe Thomas, an homage to his third effort My Name Is Joe (2000), was released on November 11, 2016. The album debuted at number two on the Top R&B/Hip-Hop Albums chart, with 17,000 copies sold the first week, and spawned the single "So I Can Have You Back", his fourth number-one hit on the Adult R&B Songs chart. In support of the album, Joe co-headlined a European concert tour alongside Ashanti from February to March 2017.

== Discography ==
Studio albums

- Everything (1993)
- All That I Am (1997)
- My Name Is Joe (2000)
- Better Days (2001)
- And Then... (2003)
- Ain't Nothin' Like Me (2007)
- Joe Thomas, New Man (2008)
- Signature (2009)
- Home Is the Essence of Christmas (2010)
- The Good, the Bad, the Sexy (2011)
- Doubleback: Evolution of R&B (2013)
- Bridges (2014)
- My Name Is Joe Thomas (2016)

== Awards and nominations ==
List of awards and nominations
Award	Year	Category	Recipients and nominees	Result	Ref.
ASCAP Awards	2001	Most Performed Songs from Motion Pictures	"I Wanna Know"	Won	
BET Awards	2001	Best R&B Male Artist	Joe	Nominated	
BMI Pop Awards	2002	Award-Winning Song	"Stutter"	Won	
Blockbuster Entertainment Awards	2001	Favorite Male Artist — R&B	My Name Is Joe	Nominated	
Grammy Awards	2001	Best Pop Collaboration with Vocals	"Thank God I Found You"	Nominated	
Grammy Awards	2001	Best Male R&B Vocal Performance	"I Wanna Know"	Nominated	
Grammy Awards	2001	Best R&B Performance by a Duo or Group with Vocals	"Coming Home"	Nominated	
Grammy Awards	2001	Best R&B Album	My Name Is Joe	Nominated	
Grammy Awards	2003	Best Male R&B Vocal Performance	"Let's Stay Home Tonight"	Nominated	
Grammy Awards	2003	Best R&B Performance by a Duo or Group with Vocals	"More Than a Woman"	Nominated	
Grammy Awards	2003	Best R&B Album	Better Days	Nominated	
NAACP Image Awards	2001	Outstanding Album	My Name Is Joe	Nominated	
Soul Train Music Awards	1997	Best R&B/Soul Single – Male	"All the Things (Your Man Won't Do)"	Nominated	
Soul Train Music Awards	1998	Best R&B/Soul Album – Male	All That I Am	Nominated	
Soul Train Music Awards	1998	Best R&B/Soul Single – Male	"Don't Wanna Be a Player"	Nominated	
Soul Train Music Awards	1999	Best R&B/Soul or Rap Music Video	"Still Not a Player"	Nominated	
Teen Choice Awards	2000	Choice Love Song	"Thank God I Found You"	Nominated	
Teen Choice Awards	2001	Choice R&B/Hip-Hop Track	"Stutter"	Nominated	
