= Kedar Massenburg =

- Born: William Henry Massenburg; March 1, 1963 (age 63); New York City, U.S.
- Genres: Neo soul
- Occupations: Record producer; record executive
- Years active: 1995–present
- Labels: Motown Records (1998–2004); Kedar Entertainment (1995–2012); RED (2012–present)
- Website: Kedar.com

William Henry "Kedar" Massenburg (born 1963) is an American record producer and music executive who served as president of Motown Records from 1997 to 2004. Massenburg is best known for managing D'Angelo as his career burgeoned, discovering and cultivating American singer Erykah Badu, as well as having trademarked the neo soul genre.

Massenburg is the founder, president and CEO of Kedar Entertainment.

== Early life and education ==
William "Kedar" Massenburg was born in 1963. Massenburg is a 1981 graduate of Erasmus Hall High School in Flatbush, Brooklyn, New York and a 1986 graduate of Central State University in Wilberforce, Ohio. He is also a member of Kappa Alpha Psi fraternity.

== Career ==
After college, Massenburg spent several years in marketing positions, including two years as a district manager for PepsiCo (maker of Pepsi Cola), and a year with SmithKline Beecham Clinical Labs Pharmaceuticals.

In 1995, he established Kedar Entertainment, originating out of his New York home, with a $1,700 outlay from his own pocket and consisted of a desk set, fax machine, copier, and portable phone. Involved in artist management, he directed the career of the pioneering hip hop group Stetsasonic for a time.

By 1994, Massenburg was negotiating artist contracts to the tune of more than $1 million a year. His own salary was in six figures, and he had hired two assistants, one of them working out of a satellite office in Los Angeles. Massenburg later expanded his activities into production, music publishing, and publicity. Massenburg was also responsible for signing the young rapper A+, and Freestyle Fellowship as well as Erykah Badu to their first major recording contracts. He was also involved in the production of Chico DeBarge's Long Time No See album which received high acclaim after Debarge's release from prison.

=== D'Angelo ===
Massenburg started managing the soul singer D'Angelo. The singer's debut single "Brown Sugar" had done well at radio on Massenburg's East Coast home turf, but had failed to get crucial West Coast airplay. EMI worked with Massenburg and flew dozens of West Coast radio programmers and their dates, into New York for a D'Angelo performance, and for upscale dining and lodging accommodations. He later told the Minneapolis Star Tribune, "Was it worth it to spend the money to fly all those programmers in? Absolutely! We saw a substantial increase in radio airplay immediately after the show."

=== Erykah Badu ===
In 1995, Kedar Entertainment signed one of its first artists: Erykah Badu. Massenburg's work on behalf of Badu got him wide notice in the industry. His first move was to pass out 1,000 copies of Badu's debut single, "On & On", at the 1996 Soul Train Music Awards. "And man, when I heard it banging out of somebody's car going down the street that same night, I knew I had something." Badu embodied the new approach Massenburg was looking for.

=== "Neo soul" ===
Massenburg wanted to start a genre that acknowledged the influence of hip-hop and of other electronics-influenced musical styles, but was a return to earlier forms. He would coin the term "neo soul" in the short time after the success of D'Angelo's Brown Sugar album.

=== Kedar Beverages LLC ===
Massenburg founded Kedar Beverages LLC in 2005, which makes chardonnay, merlot and cabernet sauvignon.

== Personal life ==
As an adult, he has lived on the Upper West Side of Manhattan and in Saddle River, New Jersey.

He currently has 3 children: Kayla Massenburg; and twins Eliana Massenburg and Elijah Massenburg.
