= Braxton Family Values season 7 =

Braxton Family Values
- Season 7
- Cover used by the iTunes Store
- Starring: Toni Braxton; Traci Braxton; Towanda Braxton; Trina Braxton; Tamar Braxton; Evelyn Braxton
- No. of episodes: 6

Release
- Original network: WE tv
- Original release: November 5 – December 17, 2020

Season chronology
- ← Previous; Season 6

The seventh season of Braxton Family Values, an American reality television series, is broadcast on WE tv. It premiered on November 5, 2020, and was primarily filmed in Atlanta, Georgia and Los Angeles, California. Its executive producers are Toni Braxton, Dan Cutforth, Jane Lipsitz, Julio Kollerbohm, Michelle Kongkasuwan, Lauren Gellert, Annabelle McDonald, and Sitarah Pendleton.

Braxton Family Values focuses on the lives of Toni Braxton and her sisters — Traci, Towanda, Trina, and Tamar, — plus their mother, Evelyn.

== Production ==
In early 2020, there were rumors of the show being canceled, however, Tamar and Trina both shut down the rumors with Trina stating the show would return in March.

In July 2020, Tamar cut ties with WE tv revealing she had only filmed a few episodes for the series' seventh season.

On October 2, 2020, it was announced that the seventh season would premiere on November 5, 2020.

On October 21, 2020, a trailer was released for the season which showed the family's reaction to Tamar's suicide attempt. The trailer was slammed by Tamar as disgusting and using her pain for ratings.

Shorty after this season wrapped, the family decided to take a step back from Fliming due to Traci’s cancer battle. This will marked the final appearance of Traci, who ended passing in March 2022

== Episodes ==
No. overall	No. in season	Title	Original release date	US viewers (millions)
143	1	"Bachelorette Braxton Style"	November 5, 2020	0.41
144	2	"A Stumble to the Altar"	November 12, 2020	0.47
145	3	"Third Times a Charm"	November 19, 2020	0.46
146	4	"Love After Lockdown"	December 3, 2020	0.41
147	5	"Life Goes On"	December 10, 2020	0.38
148	6	"Sister Staycation"	December 17, 2020	0.35
