= Crash & Burn (Traci Braxton album) =

Studio album by Traci Braxton
- Released: October 7, 2014
- Recorded: 2013–2014
- Genre: R&B
- Length: 43:22
- Label: eOne
- Producer: David Lindsey (exec.); Cliff Jones (exec.); Bob Terry

Traci Braxton chronology
Crash & Burn (2014)	On Earth (2018)

Singles from Crash & Burn
- 1. "Last Call" Released: July 15, 2014; 2. "Perfect Time" Released: January 19, 2015

Crash & Burn is the debut studio album by American singer Traci Braxton. eOne and Soul World released the album October 7, 2014. Braxton had previously released music with her sisters as part of the group The Braxtons. Cliff Jones and David Lindsey were the album's executive producers. Crash & Burn is a R&B album, which Braxton said had influences from adult contemporary music. Critics thought the songs focused on love but Braxton clarified that the lyrics dealt with her attempts to start a solo music career.

Crash & Burn received a mixed response from critics. Some liked the album's production quality though other commentators criticized the amount of Auto-Tune used on it. The album peaked at number 108 on the Billboard Hot 200 chart and sold 4,000 copies in its first week. It also appeared on other Billboard charts. Two singles—"Last Call" and "Perfect Time"—were released. The lead single was promoted through a music video and was received negatively by critics. The recording and promotion of Crash & Burn was included in episodes of Braxton Family Values.

== Background and recording ==
While appearing in the reality television series Braxton Family Values, Traci Braxton received a solo record deal with eOne. She was previously signed to Atlantic in the 1990s alongside her sisters as part of the group The Braxtons. Braxton pursued a solo career after her manager encouraged her to take music more seriously. She recorded Crash & Burn at Soul World Entertainment in Upper Marlboro, Maryland, and StarMakers Studios in Beltsville, Maryland. Cliff Jones and David Lindsey were the album's executive producers. Braxton said that they "brought out [her] sound and story" and compared the collaboration to that between Jimmy Jam and Terry Lewis and Janet Jackson. The recording process was shown in a season three episode of Braxton Family Values.

== Composition and lyrics ==
Crash & Burn is a R&B album that consists of eleven tracks. Andy Kellman of AllMusic noted the songs contained considerable use of Auto-Tune. Describing the vocals, MadameNoire's Veronica Wells said Traci's vocal range was higher than Toni's yet lower than Tamar's. Braxton said that she wanted her music to sound like a combination of Mary J. Blige and Jill Scott. Music critics had varying interpretations of the album's lyrics. Kellman wrote that the songs revolve around "heartbreak, romance, lust, and perseverance", while others felt that Braxton referenced problems within her marriage.

In the second track, "What About Love?", Braxton sings about a romantic relationship that she is unable to fix by herself. The following song, "Stay Sippin'", a duet with Raheem DeVaughn, who is the only featured artist on the standard edition of the album, revolves around whether the singer should love or leave her partner. During the midtempo ballad "Last Call", Braxton sings about repairing a damaged relationship. On the ninth track "Passion", she flirts with a man, but questions if they have a future as a couple; Charles referred to the song's composition as "upbeat [and] bubbly". Braxton sings about her partner's negative qualities on the tenth track "Reasons", which Charles describes as "snappy" and likened to Toni Braxton's 1993 single "Another Sad Love Song". The album's final track "Crash & Burn" focuses on "hav[ing] success in the fullness of time, and with the right intentions". Khayree Ali and Niko are featured on the album's bonus tracks.

== Release and promotion ==
eOne and Soul World released Crash & Burn as an audio CD and digital download on October 7, 2014, Toni Braxton's birthday. An edition of the album, with two bonus tracks, was also made available at Best Buy. Braxton released the album artwork and the track listing in September 2014, which Khayla of SoulBounce.com described as "fierce and edgy". Following the release of Crash & Burn, Braxton was criticized for being "past her prime for being a recording artist". She responded by encouraging others to follow their dreams.

=== Singles ===
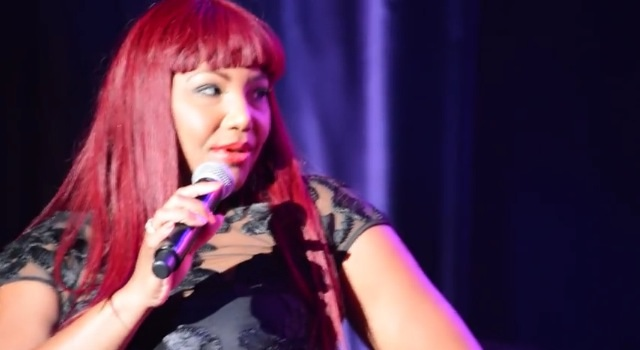
Traci Braxton performing at Howard University in 2014

"Last Call" was released on July 15, 2014, as the lead single from Crash & Burn. While Veronica Wells praised the single, two reviewers from SoulBounce.com called the track as unmemorable. The single was featured on the fourth season of Braxton Family Values. Braxton performed it at the Concert for a Cause: A Night to Support Childhood Literacy at Howard University in September 2014. During the performance, she gave her husband a lap dance, which Wells called inappropriate for the event.

The accompanying music video was released on September 8, 2014, through Braxton's Vevo account. In it, Braxton flirts with a man jogging in her neighborhood. Her siblings—Toni, Tamar, and Trina Braxton—help her attract the man to the house, where the pair cuddle on the patio and drink Hennessy. D-Money of SoulBounce.com responded negatively to Traci's wardrobe and hair styles. He wrote the video had "a hazy, slightly artificial look to every single frame". "Last Call" peaked at number sixteen on the Billboard Adult R&B Songs chart.

"Perfect Time" was released as the album's second single. Before performing it for radio industry programmers, Braxton had a panic attack.

== Reception ==
Crash & Burn received mixed reviews from music critics. Phinesse Demps of The Baltimore Times responded positively to the album's production and commended Braxton for creating "a very adult sound". Praising the compositions as "undoubtedly contemporary and sleek", Andy Kellman wrote that the album contains a "decent assortment of adult-oriented R&B songs". Melody Charles referred to Crash & Burn as Braxton's way of building "her own distinct groove" but felt it was not as polished as music released by her sisters Toni and Tamar; Charles was also critical of the amount of Auto-Tune used on the album. On Twitter, Tamar panned the album for its use of Auto-Tune; she wrote: "Do the Grammys have a duet with auto tune category yet?"

On October 25, 2014, "Crash & Burn" debuted at #108 on the Billboard Hot 200 with sales of 4,000 in its first week. The album also debuted at number one on the Billboard Heatseekers Album chart, number eleven on the Billboard R&B Albums chart and number eighteen on the Billboard Top R&B/Hip-Hop Albums.

== Track listing ==
Writing and production credits for the songs are taken from the booklet in Crash and Burn.

Standard edition
No.	Title	Writer(s)	Producer(s)	Length
1.	"Holding On"	Bobby D. Terry; Chris Lewis; Cliff Jones; James Reginald Carr	Terry; Lewis	4:08
2.	"What About Love?"	Terry; Lewis; Jones; Carr	Terry; Lewis	3:44
3.	"Stay Sippin'" (featuring Raheem DeVaughn)	Jones; David Lindsey; Harold F. Garvin II; Kimberly Udeozor; Raheem DeVaughn	Lindsey	4:13
4.	"Last Call"	Jones; Lindsey; Garvin; Nicole Sims	Lindsey	3:44
5.	"DWLY"	Jones; Lindsey; Garvin; Linda Creed; Sims; Scott Forbes; Thomas Bell; Traci Braxton	Lindsey	4:34
6.	"Goodbye"	Brandon Best; Jones; Lindsey; Garvin; Braxton	Lindsey	4:25
7.	"Perfect Time"	Terry; Lewis; Jones; Curtis L. Williams; Durrell Babbs	Terry; Lewis	3:38
8.	"Need It In My Life"	Jones; Lindsey; Garvin	Lindsey	4:35
9.	"Passion"	Terry; Lewis; Jones; Carr; Jarmone Davis; Kevin Jerome Rutledge	Terry; Lewis	4:30
10.	"Reasons"	Jones; Lindsey; Grant William Nicholas; Kenneth Epperson Jr.; Michael Braxton; T. Braxton	Lindsey	2:55
11.	"Crash & Burn"	Jones; Lindsey; Garvin; Udeozor; T. Braxton	Lindsey	3:47
Total length:				43:22

Best Buy edition (bonus tracks)
No.	Title	Writer(s)	Producer(s)	Length
12.	"Watch Me Go!" (featuring Khayree Ali)	Lindsey; Garvin; Kimberly Udeozor; Jones; Khayree Amir Abdullah	Lindsey	2:53
13.	"More Than That" (featuring Niko)	Lindsey; Jones; Garvin; Udeozor	Lindsey	3:15
Total length:				49:30

== Credits and personnel ==
The following credits were adapted from AllMusic:

- Traci Braxton – primary artist, producer
- Danielle Brimm – artists and repertoire
- Ray Cox – photography
- Shawnte Crespo – product manager
- Raheem DeVaughn – featured artist
- Isabel Evans – artists and repertoire
- Nate Fields – guitar (bass)
- Paul Grosso – creative director
- Jamil Johnson – mixing
- Jamil "Face" Johnson – mixing
- Cliff Jones – executive producer, producer
- Kenneth Epperson, Jr. – producer, production assistant
- Chris Lewis – engineer, mixing
- Chris "Symfonikz" Lewis – producer
- Dave Lindsey – engineer, mixing
- Dave "DaveyBoy" Lindsey – producer
- David Lindsey – executive producer, producer
- Sean Marlowe – art direction, design
- Joe Moore – production assistant
- Tommie Reed – artists and repertoire
- Kevin Rutledge – producer
- Julia Sutowski – coordinating producer
- Big Bob Terry – producer
- Bob Terry – producer

== Charts ==
Chart (2014)	Peak position
US Billboard 200	108
US Top R&B/Hip-Hop Albums (Billboard)	18
US Heatseekers Albums (Billboard)	1

== Release history ==
Region	Date	Format	Label	Ref
Worldwide	October 7, 2014	Digital download, CD	eOne, Soul World	
