= Braxton Family Values season 5 =

Season of television series

Braxton Family Values
- Season 5
- Starring: Toni Braxton; Traci Braxton; Towanda Braxton; Trina Braxton; Tamar Braxton; Evelyn Braxton
- No. of episodes: 26

Release
- Original network: WE tv
- Original release: May 19, 2016 – May 25, 2017

Season chronology
- ← Previous; Season 4 Next → Season 6

The fifth season of Braxton Family Values, an American reality television series, broadcast on WE tv. It premiered on May 19, 2016, and was primarily filmed in Atlanta, Georgia and Los Angeles, California. Its executive producers are Toni Braxton, Tamar Braxton, Vincent Herbert, Dan Cutforth, Jane Lipsitz, Julio Kollerbohm, Michelle Kongkasuwan, Lauren Gellert, Annabelle McDonald and Sitarah Pendelton.

Braxton Family Values focuses on the lives of Toni Braxton and her sisters — Tamar, Traci, Towanda, and Trina — plus their mother, Evelyn.

== Production ==
A teaser trailer revealing the renewal of Braxton Family Values season 5 was released on April 21, 2016, via WE tv's YouTube channel. The season premiered with "Not My Momma!" on May 19, 2016. The season went on a seven-month hiatus in August, 2016. On February 2, 2017, Towanda Braxton released a tea party themed teaser on her Instagram account announcing the series would continue on March 16, 2017, for its sixteenth episode.

== Synopsis ==
Evelyn reveals the news to her daughters about her mini stroke sending the sisters into a panic. Toni and Tamar team up to persuade her to move back to L.A., but the other sisters want her to stay in Atlanta to recuperate. Towanda seeks her sisters help as her daughter Brooke needs to understand the changes a young girl faces leading to uncomfortable questions. Trina announces to her sisters that she has been going to therapy to deal with her issues at hand and confronts them. Trina contacts her ex-husband Gabe leading to visiting a therapist to form a reconciliation in order for her to move on once and for all but Gabe has other plans.

Traci becomes worried after receiving some unsettling news from her doctor resulting her to undergo surgery. Trina visits a hypnotherapist to deal with her fear of birds, Tamar and Towanda help Trina to confront her fear by leaving Trina so she can face it alone. Toni has been singing about heartache, struggles and fears for years, but this season she conquers one major fear that's been holding her back. Traci goes back into the studio to record tracks for her sophomore album, she invites her sisters Toni, Towanda and Trina to a session later to find out they were tricked asking them to provide background vocals on the song "Broken Things".

=== U.S. television ratings ===
The season's premiere episode "Not My Momma!" attracted over 0.84 thousand viewers during its initial broadcast on May 19, 2016, including 0.38 thousand viewers in the 18–49 demographic via Nielsen ratings. The season's most watched episode "Tabloids, Rumors, & Repercussions", attracted over 1.02 million viewers during its initial broadcast on March 16, 2017, including 0.38 thousand viewers in the 18–49 demographic via Nielsen ratings. Toni did Not Appear In Episode 13.

== Episodes ==
No. overall	No. in season	Title	Original release date	US viewers (millions)
91	1	"Not My Momma!"	May 19, 2016	0.84
Evelyn suffers from a stroke, which turns into an East Coast vs. West Coast sister battle over Mommy! Evelyn’s near death experience sparks a new lease on life while Traci faces a health scare of her own.
92	2	"Man Enough for Mommy"	May 26, 2016	0.68
Trina hires a matchmaker for Evelyn in Atlanta; and Toni takes a plunge in search of new experiences. Later, Tamar wants to enlist the help of Tyler Henry, a purported medium, to connect with loved ones who have passed away, but tensions rise when Trina disagrees with her plan.
93	3	"Shit Gets Real!"	June 2, 2016	0.93
Tamar opens up about her exit from "The Real"; and Trina wants to buy a gun to protect herself from a stalker, but her sisters protest. Later, Tamar and Toni crash Miss E's date.
94	4	"Not Famous Enough"	June 9, 2016	0.93
Towanda reveals Trina's new relationship; Traci worries about her upcoming surgery; and Tamar grows upset when Towanda goes missing at her fashion show. Later, father issues arise for Tamar and Trina.
95	5	"Oh You Tried It!"	June 16, 2016	0.66
Toni screens her biopic movie; Tamar meets her on-screen counterpart; and Towanda confesses her secret to Trina. Later, Trina finally deals with her sister issues.
96	6	"You Gotta Get Pelvic to Pelvic!"	June 23, 2016	0.80
Toni performs in Brooklyn; a dinner turns disastrous; Towanda's disappointed in her partner at a dance competition; and Tamar critiques Towanda. Later, Toni reveals her plans to change her show to Tamar, but she's worried Trina and Towanda will be upset.
97	7	"Toni Got a Ditty!"	June 30, 2016	0.78
Tamar's nervous about her performance for Smokey Robinson; Toni reveals that she has a date; and Towanda attends a secret appointment. Later, Trina confronts her sisters.
98	8	"You Want That Thang Back?"	July 7, 2016	0.77
Trina reveals that she contacted her ex, Gabe, much to Tamar's dismay. Later, Toni gets competitive at a cook-off between the sisters; and Towanda feels challenged during acting class.
99	9	"Wasband's Back"	July 14, 2016	0.75
Trina has a candid conversation with her ex that turns sour when past infidelities are brought up. Later, Toni's final show with Trina and Towanda performing as her backup singers is an emotional event for everyone involved.
100	10	"What's the T With You and B?"	July 21, 2016	0.83
Toni surprises her sisters with an unexpected visitor to celebrate their final performance; Toni invites a man to dinner; and Tamar insists on coaching Evelyn for her runway debut. Later, Gabe has a proposal for Trina.
101	11	"This Is Not About ReKindlerization...or Is It?"	July 28, 2016	0.74
Trina moves forward with Gabe, but he's looking for more than closure. Later, Tamar has a photo shoot; and Traci records a sexy, new album but her manager has doubts about her new record.
102	12	"Trick Thy Sister"	August 4, 2016	0.79
Gabe makes a shocking confession to Trina. Later, Tamar performs at an exclusive event; Traci tricks her sisters at her studio session; and Toni's dinner is ruined after Tamar's insulted.
103	13	"Flippin' the Bird"	August 11, 2016	0.68
Tamar's shocked by her sisters' reaction to her surprise. Later, Trina worries Towanda's new home could signify a big move; and Trina enlists a hypnotist to help conquer her fear.
104	14	"Broadway or Bust"	August 18, 2016	0.71
Trina's sons have a showdown with her ex, Gabe. Later, Tamar informs the producers that her sisters aren't interested in doing a Broadway show; and Towanda performs for an agent.
105	15	"Spilling The Tea"	August 25, 2016	0.79
Tensions rise between the sisters at Toni's slumber party. Later, Tamar storms out after Toni grows tired of her bad attitude.
106	16	"Tabloids, Rumors, & Repercussions"	March 16, 2017	1.02
Tamar faces tabloid rumors about her marriage; Towanda finally files for divorce; and Toni gets grilled about her new romance. Later, Traci confronts Tamar about her posts on social media.
107	17	"You Run Your Mouth, I'll Run My Business"	March 23, 2017	0.88
Towanda's divorce battle continues and it's war; a sudden glitch injures Toni right before she's about to perform; a taste test quickly turns south when Tamar and Trina get heated over Bar Chix.
108	18	"The Mother of All Insults"	March 30, 2017	0.84
The sisters' blowout fight leads to a major insult. Later, Tamar reveals a secret she's kept from her sisters; and Trina scouts for her pop-up Bar Chix location.
109	19	"Bird on the Brain"	April 6, 2017	0.90
Tamar finally tells her parents her secret, stunning Miss Evelyn; Tamar grills Toni about her new beau; Birdman meets Daddy at a family dinner; Tamar proposes a shocking invitation to her sisters.
110	20	"Back In The Hot Seat"	April 13, 2017	0.80
The sisters fear old wounds will be exposed on Bishop T.D. Jakes' talk show; and a last-minute performance throws them off. Later, a blended-family proposal shocks all when Daddy suggests his wife attend a family trip.
111	21	"Pop Up, Pop Off"	April 20, 2017	0.76
The sisters confront Trina after hearing concerning rumors before her Pop Up Bar Chix event. Later, Trina reveals the truth about an arrest at her home; and tempers flare in Towanda's custody battle.
112	22	"Opposing Counsel"	April 27, 2017	0.85
Tamar's new single sparks drama when Evelyn is shocked to find out it's written about her divorce. Later, the gloves come off in Towanda's custody battle; and Traci does a photoshoot for her whiskey line.
113	23	"Donde Esta Daddy?"	May 4, 2017	0.74
The Braxtons arrive in Puerto Vallarta, Mexico, for their family trip. Later, surprise guests threaten to ruin the vacation.
114	24	"The Other Mrs. Braxton"	May 11, 2017	0.86
Daddy brings his wife to Mexico, stunning Miss Evelyn and the gals. Later, all hell breaks loose when Toni invites Daddy and his wife to dinner; and the ladies learn the truth after years of misconceptions.
115	25	"After the Storm"	May 18, 2017	0.83
The sisters try to move forward after their dramatic dinner with their dad. Later, Tamar tries to clear the air with her dad but isn't ready to invite his wife to Vince's birthday party; and the sisters bail on the party.
116	26	"There's Something About Mommy"	May 25, 2017	0.91
In the Season 5 finale, Toni discovers a scary new Lupus symptom that could change her life forever. Later, Towanda reveals news about her divorce; and Evelyn finally opens up about the ladies' father and the Mexico trip.

== Home media ==
The first volume of season 5 was released digitally to Amazon and iTunes store in the United States.
