= Braxton Family Values season 2 =

Braxton Family Values
- Season 2
- Starring: Toni Braxton; Traci Braxton; Towanda Braxton; Trina Braxton; Tamar Braxton; Evelyn Braxton
- No. of episodes: 26

Release
- Original network: WE tv
- Original release: November 10, 2011 – September 20, 2012

Season chronology
- ← Previous; Season 1 Next → Season 3

The second season of Braxton Family Values, an American reality television series, was broadcast on WE tv. The series aired from November 10, 2011 until September 20, 2012, consisting of 26 episodes.

== Production ==
Braxton Family Values was officially renewed for its second season on March 10, 2011, announced by WE tv.

=== U.S. television ratings ===
The season's premiere episode "R.E.S.P.E.C.T" attracted over 1.18 million viewers during its initial broadcast on November 10, 2011, including 0.600 thousand viewers in the 18–49 demographic via Nielsen ratings. The season's most watched episode "Desert Divas", attracted over 1.39 million viewers during its initial broadcast on January 26, 2012, including 0.800 thousand viewers in the 18–49 demographic via Nielsen ratings.

== Episodes ==
No. overall	No. in season	Title	Original release date	US viewers (millions)
11	1	"R.E.S.P.E.C.T"	November 10, 2011	1.18
In the Season 2 premiere, Toni reveals a secret about Tamar that leads to a tense confrontation; Trina's marriage suffers after Towanda and her family move in.
12	2	"Beauty School Dropout"	November 17, 2011	0.85
Tamar reveals her solo project to her sisters, then goes behind her husband's back to choose a producer she likes rather than her husband's choice; and Traci decides to give up singing and go back to beauty school.
13	3	"A Snooping Dog"	December 1, 2011	N/A
Tamar gets a new job hosting a radio show; Trina tells her husband she's working on a solo project that will take her away from home more than usual; and Andre asks Towanda for ways they can improve their marriage.
14	4	"Toni's New Doo-Wop Chick"	December 8, 2011	0.80
Toni asks Traci to back her as a singer for a show in Indiana, and also asks Tamar to teach Traci the choreography, but the lesson takes a bad turn when Traci walks off the stage; and Trina meets Evelyn's new boyfriend.
15	5	"The Graduate"	December 15, 2011	0.86
Trina graduates from business school and receives a surprise from her dad and also throws a party to celebrate; and Toni and Tamar fight when Toni announces that she's firing her manager.
16	6	"The Family Unites"	December 22, 2011	N/A
Toni has surgery; Andre writes a book; Tamar heads into the studio for the recording of her album Love and War.
17	7	"Family Feuding"	December 29, 2011	0.97
Trina wants Towanda to move out, but it's left to Gabe to drop the hint; Tamar gets Traci get in a fight when Tamar gets Traci an internship at a Beverly Hills salon and Traci quits.
18	8	"NYC or Bust"	January 5, 2012	0.86
The sisters rehearse ahead of a show in New York City; Trina has a vocal setback; Tamar criticizes Traci; an old flame sweeps Evelyn off her feet.
19	9	"Like Husband, Like Wife"	January 12, 2012	1.08
Trina shocks her sisters by revealing her affair; Tamar and Toni clash during a family lunch with Evelyn, prompting an intervention.
20	10	"Sisters at War"	January 19, 2012	0.98
Toni gets inducted into the Georgia Music Hall of Fame; Toni's sisters leave everyone disappointed.
21	11	"Desert Divas"	January 26, 2012	1.39
True feelings are revealed during a therapy session; Toni opines that Traci needs to lose weight, and she tells her sisters that she is through carrying them.
22	12	"Rocky Relationships"	February 2, 2012	1.12
Tamar and Vince clash during a trip to Chicago; Towanda shows off her new place, but her mood is dampened by a request from Andre; and Trina's husband suggests marriage counseling.
23	13	"Critical Condition"	February 9, 2012	1.09
Vince is hospitalized after doctors find blood clots in his lungs; Trina tells Evelyn about Gabe's cyber trysts.
24	14	"Stir Crazy"	February 16, 2012	0.99
Towanda finds a big mess at Tamar's temporary home; Gabe worries that Trina will cheat on him again; Evelyn tells Towanda that she's engaged.
25	15	"Soul-o Act"	February 23, 2012	0.93
Tamar lands a gig performing at a tribute to Gladys Knight in Atlanta; Toni becomes the wedding coordinator for her mom's nuptials.
26	16	"Bridezilla"	March 1, 2012	0.91
A bachelorette party is planned for Evelyn; Toni returns to the studio with her ex, Keri; Vince wants to get a puppy.
27	17	"Wedding Daze"	March 8, 2012	0.91
Wedding stress gets to Evelyn; Traci meets with her father in Maryland; Tamar and Vince return home with their new puppy and clash over dog-training philosophies.
28	18	"A Clean Break"	March 15, 2012	0.86
Evelyn calls off the wedding; Toni tells Tamar that she has parted ways with Vince; Gabe tries to make amends by confessing his transgressions against Trina to the family at dinner.
29	19	"We Got You"	March 22, 2012	0.86
Trina copes with leaving Gabe, and performs original material in front of her sisters for the first time; Tamar speaks with a fertility doctor; and the family appears on "Dr. Phil" to vent their issues.
30	20	"Reunion Special"	March 29, 2012	N/A
Season 2 Reunion special hosted by Wendy Williams.
31	21	"Baby Business and Background Singers"	August 16, 2012	0.90
Tamar weighs her fertility options; Toni looks for backing vocalists; Evelyn opts to start a life-coaching business.
32	22	"Sock It to 'Em"	August 23, 2012	0.82
Trina quits her band to focus on her solo career; Toni models for an Autism cause at Fashion Week; Tamar and Vince meet potential surrogate mothers.
33	23	"Great Eggspectations"	August 30, 2012	0.86
Towanda is set up on a blind date; Trina makes a music video; Tamar gets her eggs harvested, fertilized and frozen.
34	24	"Birthday Party or Go Home"	September 6, 2012	N/A
Trina prepares for a music-video shoot; Traci is given a surprise birthday party; the girls worry about Evelyn and stage a diabetes intervention.
35	25	"Making the Cut"	September 13, 2012	0.77
Toni asks her sisters to perform with her in St. Lucia; Gabe gets a makeover; Trina screens her music video for Tamar and Toni.
36	26	"For Better or Worse"	September 20, 2012	0.96
The Braxtons go on vacation; Trina's renewal ceremony.
