= Braxton Family Values season 4 =

Braxton Family Values
- Season 4
- Starring: Toni Braxton; Traci Braxton; Towanda Braxton; Trina Braxton; Tamar Braxton; Evelyn Braxton
- No. of episodes: 28

Release
- Original network: WE tv
- Original release: August 14, 2014 – November 12, 2015

Season chronology
- ← Previous; Season 3 Next → Season 5

The fourth season of Braxton Family Values, an American reality television series, was broadcast on WE tv. The series aired from August 14, 2014, until November 12, 2015, consisting of 28 episodes. Its executive producers were Toni Braxton, Tamar Braxton, Vincent Herbert, Dan Cutforth, Jane Lipsitz, Julio Kollerbohm, Michelle Kongkasuwan, Lauren Gellert, Annabelle McDonald and Sitarah Pendelton.

Braxton Family Values focuses on the lives of Toni Braxton and her sisters — Tamar, Traci, Towanda, and Trina — plus their mother, Evelyn.

The season received generally favorable reviews from critics and was the most watched season with 1.5 million total viewers, up 8% compared to the previous seasons.

== Production ==
Braxton Family Values was officially renewed for its fourth season on March 20, 2014, announced by WE tv. A teaser trailer was released on July 1, 2014, on WE tv's YouTube channel.

The season premiered with "Bright Lights, Big Breakdowns" on August 14, 2014. The season went on a seven-month hiatus before returning on May 21, 2015, for its eleventh episode. The twenty-sixth episode "Making Fetch Happen" served as the season finale, airing on September 3, 2015. It was followed by a two-part special "Braxton Family Secrets" that aired on November 5, and November 12, 2015, which marked the conclusion of the season.

== Synopsis ==
As Tamar and Towanda's feud continues to escalate, Towanda gets pushed to her breaking point. The sisters attempt to mend the bond of sisterhood again by going to a therapy retreat but it doesn't take long for Tamar and Traci to bump heads resulting Tamar to leave. The sisters rent a home in L.A. to work on an inspirational album together later deciding on recording a single together as the girls couldn't agree on the direction of the family album. Traci, Towanda and Trina surprise Tamar on stage during her solo tour, while Tamar doesn't react to the idea well the sisters get kicked out of the building leaving the sisters deeply hurt. Evelyn faces major surgery as the sisters rush to Los Angeles to be by her side. Tamar fears she can't be there for the operation. Trina announces she's filing for a divorce from her estranged husband Gabe after appearing in divorce court with Gabe resulting she and her two sons must move out of their home in five days. Traci is anxious about her teenage son's engagement, but she's not ready to tell her family.

Toni wins her seventh Grammy Award for Best R&B Album at the 57th Annual Grammy Awards for her collaborative album "Love, Marriage & Divorce" with Babyface. Trina finds herself wrapped up in a new relationship with her contractor Jacent, the sisters meddle in Trina's love life and invite him to dinner. Tamar invites the sisters to the studio to listen to her new single If I Don't Have You and Toni brings the idea forward to record a Christmas album with the sisters. As the sisters get together in the studio recording tracks for the album, tensions arise with Toni and Traci resulting Traci to leave the recording studio potentially putting the Christmas album in jeopardy.

=== U.S. television ratings ===
The season's premiere episode "Bright Lights, Big Breakdowns" attracted over 1.22 million viewers during its initial broadcast on August 14, 2014, including 0.500 thousand viewers in the 18–49 demographic via Nielsen ratings. It marked as the most watched season premiere of the franchise. The season's most watched episode "Divine Intervention", attracted over 1.30 million viewers during its initial broadcast on July 9, 2015, including 0.600 thousand viewers in the 18–49 demographic via Nielsen ratings.

== Episodes ==
No. overall	No. in season	Title	Original release date	US viewers (millions)
63	1	"Bright Lights, Big Breakdowns"	August 14, 2014	1.22
The sisters are in New York City for the premiere of Toni’s new Broadway show, and tensions are high. Tamar is disappointed when Toni skips her birthday party, where one of the guests makes a comment that offends the sisters. At dinner after Toni’s show, Tamar and Towanda disagree about the comment, and about what Tamar’s fans have said on social media. Tamar and Towanda’s feud continues to escalate, pushing Towanda to her breaking point, and ending the trip with an epic meltdown!
64	2	"Sisters on the Verge"	August 21, 2014	1.11
After Towanda’s meltdown in NYC, the sisters go on a therapy retreat and agree to try to make positive changes. However, when Traci accuses Tamar’s assistant of grabbing her, Tamar blows up and claims the assistant was protecting her from Traci. Tamar says she wants to quit the show, the fighting gets more explosive, and Traci threatens to press charges. Tamar storms out, and the rest of the girls try team-building exercises. Tamar returns for a final session, but the girls worry it’s too late.
65	3	"Jamaican Me Crazy"	August 28, 2014	1.19
After all the drama, Evelyn insists the sisters join Toni while she’s performing in Jamaica, and spend time together just having some fun. Tamar reluctantly agrees, and brings Vince and Logan with her. Trina performs her single at Toni’s concert, but the girls panic when Traci’s late for the show. The sisters have fun parasailing and hanging out, and even indulge in a little “puff-puff-pass”. However, they fight over details of the family album and have serious doubts about getting it done.
66	4	"I Ain't Scared of No Demons"	September 4, 2014	1.15
The sisters settle into the LA rental house, even though Tamar insists it’s haunted. Stressed about her solo tour, Tamar struggles to find female dancers. The girls can’t agree on the direction of the family album, especially veteran Toni and “new artist” Tamar. When Evelyn has a piano delivered for inspiration, and pushes the girls to sing songs from their childhood, Tamar takes over and starts acting like a choir director. They start writing, but get nowhere when they can’t agree on lyrics.
67	5	"Starting Off on a Bad Note"	September 11, 2014	1.12
The sisters start work on the album but clash about the details, especially Toni and Tamar. Evelyn has a piano delivered for inspiration, and Tamar gets the take-over spirit. Tamar searches for dancers.
68	6	"Dares & Distractions"	September 18, 2014	1.00
The sisters are in LA to work on the Braxton album, however, progress is extremely slow. Mama Evelyn invites their brother Michael to help, but drama erupts when Tamar accuses Toni of not wanting to sing with them. Gabe shows up as a surprise houseguest, putting the roommates on edge. The girls make pot brownies to calm their nerves, but Evelyn shows up and creates more chaos. The sisters throw a pajama party, and a drinking game of crazy dares turns into a wild blowout between Tamar and Trina!
69	7	"A Single Decision"	September 25, 2014	0.70
The sisters discuss the fate of the family album, since there’s been little progress, they decide to do a single instead. Tamar auditions dancers for her tour and meets with a designer about the wardrobe. Trina stresses out while planning a housewarming party with her company Bar Chix. Towanda and Traci decide they’ve had enough of Gabe as a houseguest. Trina gets little help from her sisters for the party; Tamar freaks out about the entertainment. Girls shock Evelyn with their album decision.
70	8	"Booked to Capacity"	October 2, 2014	0.82
Toni reveals information in her memoir that shocks her mom and her fans. Evelyn is still upset about news that the sisters decided to do a single and not a full album. Tamar battles with her creative team while making final preparations for her solo tour. Traci has a photo shoot for her upcoming album release, but her nerves threaten to sabotage the shoot. Trina, Towanda and Traci move out of their LA rental house, and hatch a plan for a risky surprise for Tamar’s Atlanta concert.
71	9	"Surprise Me Not"	October 9, 2014	0.85
Towanda, Traci and Trina surprise Tamar on stage during her solo tour. It’s meant to be a fun moment, but Tamar is caught off guard and feels disrespected, especially after she worked so hard to perfect every detail of her show. After the concert, everyone backstage gets kicked out, and Trina, Traci and Towanda are deeply hurt. Toni hears both sides of the story, and Dr. Sherry tries to help resolve things, but all the sisters are defensive. A final meeting turns into a major screaming match.
72	10	"A Split Decision"	October 16, 2014	0.90
The sisters meet to work out their issues after Tamar’s Atlanta show, but drama escalates, and the future of the single remains in jeopardy. Tensions are thick between Tamar and Trina when they appear at the Essence Festival, and Trina doesn’t stay for Tamar’s big performance. Traci invites the sisters to be in her music video. Everyone fears the worst when a Braxton is rushed to the hospital. Tamar considers a drastic decision about the sisterhood, and Toni presents a surprise proposal.
73	11	"Go for the Jugular!"	May 21, 2015	1.23
The Braxton sisters attempt to put the past behind them and reunite for a weekend, after finding out their mom Evelyn needs major surgery. Trina reveals to Towanda she’s decided to file for divorce, but she’s not ready to tell the other sisters. Towanda tips off the sisters that something is wrong, and they pressure Trina to reveal her secret. Traci’s teenage son, Kevin Jr. shocks his parents with news he’s engaged. Traci demands to know if his girlfriend is pregnant!
74	12	"Ms. E-Mergency"	May 28, 2015	1.21
Mama Evelyn faces major surgery, and the sisters rush to LA to be by her side. Tamar panics when she can’t be there for the operation. Trina tells the family about appearing in divorce court with Gabe: the judge says she and her two sons must move out of their home in five days. Trina breaks down while Evelyn is still in surgery. Traci is anxious about her teenage son’s engagement, but she’s not ready to tell her family. The girls are afraid for Trina when she reveals more divorce details.
75	13	"No Time to Panic!"	June 4, 2015	1.06
As ordered by divorce court, Trina and her sons must quickly move out of their home. Trina also discovers Gabe is messing with her finances, which could jeopardize the opening of her new bar. Tamar and Toni check on mom Evelyn after her surgery, and worry about Trina’s divorce. Tamar is hurt when she finds out about Trina’s upcoming 40th birthday party through Toni. Traci stresses about her son’s engagement as she preps for a big showcase, and has a panic attack minutes before hitting the stage!
76	14	"Forty, Free, and On Fleek!"	June 11, 2015	1.04
Traci panics before her showcase and struggles to take the stage. The sisters get together for Trina’s 40th, but no one knows if Tamar is coming. Toni receives a woman’s empowerment award and is nominated for another Grammy. Tamar feels out of the loop. Traci is still stressed about her teenage son’s engagement, and nervously tells her sisters the news. Trina tries to take her mind off of her divorce with Gabe; she shocks the family with a mystery date at her superhero-themed birthday party.
77	15	"Taste For Chocolate…"	June 18, 2015	1.14
Trina goes on her first date since filing for divorce. Sisters help Toni get ready for the Grammys, and Toni tricks them into getting into a sub-zero machine for weight loss. The girls are concerned as they notice Traci drinking more than usual. Tamar feels distant from her sisters and wants to meet with them to repair their relationships. But Tamar and Trina get into an explosive argument when Tamar’s Atlanta concert comes up! Toni wins her 7th Grammy, but Tamar is missing from the celebration.
78	16	"Sisters Strike Out"	June 25, 2015	1.02
After the recent blowup between Trina and Tamar, Evelyn tries to get her daughters to discuss their issues. However, they don’t want to stir things up again. They try to bond over bowling, but Trina gets defensive about her divorce and breaks down. Tamar works on new music and stresses about high expectations for her next album. Toni preps for her Miami show and invites Traci to do backup. Traci acts bizarrely right before showtime, shocking her sisters, and making them wonder what’s going on?
79	17	"Queens of the Everglades"	July 2, 2015	1.01
Traci’s behavior in Miami concerns the family; Toni confronts Traci about drinking. Traci is angry that she always supports her sisters but they don’t support her. The sisters panic on an alligator tour! Tamar is nervous about being a judge on RuPaul’s Drag Race. The sisters tour Trina’s Bar Chix restaurant and critique the menu. Toni presents a UNCF scholarship with her son Diezel. At the event, Tamar leaves when she sees someone who attacked her on social media, and misses Diezel’s big night.
80	18	"Divine Intervention"	July 9, 2015	1.30
After Tamar doesn’t attend an event honoring Toni’s son, Toni and the other sisters are surprised and upset. Tamar explains she came to the event but didn’t stay because her sisters had brought someone who has attacked her on social media. A heated argument among the sisters gets out of control; Evelyn is extremely frustrated. The Braxton parents organize a family session with well-known spiritual advisor Bishop T.D. Jakes. Tamar gets emotional, but the sisters don’t believe she’s sincere.
81	19	"One Wild Ride"	July 16, 2015	1.26
The family’s spiritual counseling session continues, and Bishop T.D. Jakes gives an enraged speech to the Braxtons about their behavior. Daddy surprises everyone with an RV trip to an amusement park. The sisters work hard to avoid bickering during the trip, with mixed results. Tamar promotes her new single on the radio. Trina takes a boxing class with Towanda and Traci to prepare for her upcoming court date with Gabe, and gets an unexpected update from her divorce attorney.
82	20	"Who's In The Hot Seat?"	July 23, 2015	1.09
Trina faces final divorce decisions, and stresses out about construction delays that are threatening the opening of her Bar Chix restaurant. Trina is on the hot seat when the sisters push to meet her new man, Jacent. Tamar nervously gets feedback from the sisters on her newly released single, and works with celebrity hairstylist Kim Kimble on a photo shoot to launch her spring fashion line. After weeks of emotional stress, Traci is pushed to talk to a counselor about her issues… and storms out.
83	21	"Last Call"	July 30, 2015	1.02
Traci finally confesses her issues to the sisters. Tamar launches her new spring fashion line and does press in New York City. Trina stresses about finding the perfect staff for Bar Chix. Trina’s new man Jacent pushes her to get more serious in their relationship. Toni asks Traci to perform one of her songs at a major jazz festival, and Traci feels overwhelmed. Toni and Tamar’s feedback at soundcheck makes Traci even more nervous. As Toni starts the show, Traci’s nerves reach an all time high.
84	22	"It's a Family Thing"	August 6, 2015	1.09
Traci performs during Toni’s show at a major jazz festival, and all the sisters are there to support her. Papa Braxton insists on meeting Trina’s new man and questions his intentions. Traci confronts her son and his fiancée about their plans and a possible pregnancy. Trina stresses about finding her staff in time for the opening of her Bar Chix restaurant. Tamar plans a family party in Atlanta for Logan’s second birthday but worries that her sisters won’t make it.
85	23	"The Feud!"	August 13, 2015	0.96
The sisters get competitive on Celebrity Family Feud for charity. They get frustrated with Toni’s answers, and must depend on Tamar to win it all in the final seconds of the game! Tamar shocks Evelyn with her new music video. Traci forces her son and his fiancée to take care of a fake baby to convince them to end their engagement. But her plan backfires when Kevin Jr. dumps the baby on Traci. Trina and Towanda take potential new bartenders on a barhopping trip, and things get out of control.
86	24	"Restraint Thineself"	August 20, 2015	0.98
Tamar and Evelyn hear Trina’s new man Jacent wants to have a private meeting with Papa Braxton. They fear a proposal may be on the horizon. Towanda pursues her acting passion and takes on a shocking role in a new theater project. Trina continues to stress about getting Bar Chix ready to open and throws a dry run party to test out her menu and potential staff. The night ends in disaster when a bartender goes on an explosive tirade, and Trina is mortified in front of her family and friends.
87	25	"An Engaging Question"	August 27, 2015	1.06
Trina recovers from a blowup at her test run party and then finds out Bar Chix is nowhere near ready to open. Tamar has an ambitious photo shoot for her upcoming new album, but she isn’t satisfied with any of the looks. With tensions high, Trina and Jacent have their first fight. Trina’s worried about a breakup, but the sisters suspect a possible proposal! Toni wants to do a Christmas album with the sisters. Will the ladies find time in their hectic schedules to finally finish an album together?
88	26	"Making Fetch Happen"	September 3, 2015	1.12
Concerned that Jacent might propose, Trina finds out what’s inside the mysterious box. Towanda and Trina want to retire as background singers, and worry how Toni will react. Tamar struggles to finish her new album, while the sisters start working on Toni’s Christmas project. The mood is tense with just 3 weeks to finish the album before Toni’s international tour begins. Schedule conflicts and past issues stir up drama. Traci storms out and arguments flare up; the sisters seem as divided as ever.
89	27	"Braxton Family Secrets Part 1"	November 5, 2015	0.45
On this special episode of Braxton Family Values, Trina, Traci and Towanda Braxton reveal all the juicy secrets behind Season 4’s biggest moments, and share all-new exclusive scenes. They’ll spill the tea (but not their cocktails) as they discuss the most hilarious and surprising moments of the season. In part one of this two-part special, the sisters will also reply to fan questions, share commentary from members of the crew, and even get a few surprises that they didn’t see coming!
90	28	"Braxton Family Secrets Part 2"	November 12, 2015	0.33
In part two of Braxton Family Secrets, Traci, Trina and Towanda return to reveal more juicy secrets behind Season 4’s biggest moments, and share all-new exclusive scenes. There will be special guests, fan questions, behind-the-scenes footage, and a whole lot more. Even the sisters will get a surprise or two of their own. In the end, all the tea will be spilled, all the gossip dished, and all the Braxton family secrets unveiled!

== Home media ==
Despite previous seasons being released to DVD, the series was released digitally to Amazon store in the United States in two volumes — Volume one and Volume two. The season was also released to iTunes into two volumes under the titles as Volume 6 and Volume 7.
