= So Many Ways (disambiguation) =

So Many Ways is a 1996 album by The Braxtons.

So Many Ways may also refer to:

- "So Many Ways" (Brook Benton song), 1959
- "So Many Ways" (The Braxtons song), 1996
- "So Many Ways" (Ellie Campbell song), 1999

== See also ==
- So Many Ways/If the Whole World Stopped Lovin', a 1973 album by Eddy Arnold
