= List of Braxton Family Values episodes =

Braxton Family Values is an American reality television series that airs on WE tv and premiered on April 12, 2011. It chronicles the lives of Braxton sisters — Toni, Tamar, Traci, Towanda, and Trina — plus their mother, Evelyn.

During the course of the series, 148 episodes of Braxton Family Values aired, including five specials, concluding on December 17, 2020.

== Series overview ==
Season	Episodes	Originally released	
Season	Episodes	First released	Last released
1	10	April 12, 2011	June 14, 2011
2	26	November 10, 2011	September 21, 2012
3	26	March 14, 2013	February 20, 2014
4	28	August 14, 2014	September 3, 2015
5	26	May 19, 2016	May 25, 2017
6	26	March 22, 2018	June 6, 2019
7	6	November 5, 2020	December 17, 2020

== Episodes ==
=== Season 1 (2011) ===
No. overall	No. in season	Title	Original release date	US viewers (millions)
1	1	"The Bermuda Triangle"	April 12, 2011	1.25
2	2	"Taste of a Wedding Singer"	April 19, 2011	1.99
3	3	"It's My Birthday"	April 26, 2011	2.05
4	4	"I Love L.A."	May 3, 2011	1.96
5	5	"From Russia With Love"	May 10, 2011	2.18
6	6	"Getting the Band Back Together"	May 17, 2011	2.21
7	7	"Dog of a Birthday Party"	May 24, 2011	1.08
8	8	"To Play or Not to Playboy"	May 31, 2011	2.91
9	9	"You Can't Go Home Again"	June 7, 2011	0.69
10	10	"Guess Who's Coming to Dinner"	June 14, 2011	1.06

=== Season 2 (2011–12) ===
No. overall	No. in season	Title	Original release date	US viewers (millions)
11	1	"R.E.S.P.E.C.T"	November 10, 2011	1.18
12	2	"Beauty School Dropout"	November 17, 2011	0.85
13	3	"A Snooping Dog"	December 1, 2011	N/A
14	4	"Toni's New Doo-Wop Chick"	December 8, 2011	0.80
15	5	"The Graduate"	December 15, 2011	0.86
16	6	"The Family Unites"	December 22, 2011	N/A
17	7	"Family Feuding"	December 29, 2011	0.97
18	8	"NYC or Bust"	January 5, 2012	0.86
19	9	"Like Husband, Like Wife"	January 12, 2012	1.08
20	10	"Sisters at War"	January 19, 2012	0.98
21	11	"Desert Divas"	January 26, 2012	1.39
22	12	"Rocky Relationships"	February 2, 2012	1.12
23	13	"Critical Condition"	February 9, 2012	1.09
24	14	"Stir Crazy"	February 16, 2012	0.99
25	15	"Soul-o Act"	February 23, 2012	0.93
26	16	"Bridezilla"	March 1, 2012	0.91
27	17	"Wedding Daze"	March 8, 2012	0.91
28	18	"A Clean Break"	March 15, 2012	0.86
29	19	"We Got You"	March 22, 2012	0.86
30	20	"Reunion Special"	March 29, 2012	N/A
31	21	"Baby Business and Background Singers"	August 16, 2012	0.90
32	22	"Sock It to 'Em"	August 23, 2012	0.82
33	23	"Great Eggspectations"	August 30, 2012	0.86
34	24	"Birthday Party or Go Home"	September 6, 2012	N/A
35	25	"Making the Cut"	September 13, 2012	0.77
36	26	"For Better or Worse"	September 20, 2012	0.96

=== Season 3 (2013–14) ===
No. overall	No. in season	Title	Original release date	US viewers (millions)
37	1	"Ciao, Braxtons!"	March 14, 2013	1.01
38	2	"Lights, Camera, Braxton Drama"	March 21, 2013	0.92
39	3	"The Tamar-vention"	March 28, 2013	0.95
40	4	"Papa Knows Best"	April 4, 2013	0.92
41	5	"Traci's Bustin' Out!"	April 11, 2013	0.94
42	6	"Party in the DMV"	April 18, 2013	1.17
43	7	"A Diva's Dilemma"	April 25, 2013	0.89
44	8	"What's Cookin' in the Oven?"	May 2, 2013	0.88
45	9	"Hello Baby, Goodbye Dog"	May 9, 2013	0.98
46	10	"Sister Act"	May 16, 2013	0.82
47	11	"Go Hard or Go Home!"	May 23, 2013	0.79
48	12	"Braxton Leading Lady"	May 30, 2013	0.88
49	13	"Rumor Has It"	June 6, 2013	0.95
50	14	"A Very Public Affair"	November 14, 2013	1.28
51	15	"I Don't Have No Baby"	November 21, 2013	1.03
52	16	"Back To Braxton Business"	November 28, 2013	0.80
53	17	"Tour De Divas"	December 5, 2013	0.83
54	18	"Birthday-Zilla"	December 12, 2013	1.05
55	19	"Birthday Bare-All"	December 19, 2013	1.33
56	20	"#Wack #Family"	January 9, 2014	1.24
57	21	"They Threw A Shoe At You?!?"	January 16, 2014	0.96
58	22	"Chix in a Row"	January 23, 2014	1.40
59	23	"Shade Anonymous"	January 30, 2014	1.12
60	24	"Who Wants To Be A Braxton?"	February 6, 2014	1.19
61	25	"Award Show Shade!"	February 13, 2014	1.29
62	26	"It's All Good!"	February 20, 2014	1.11

=== Season 4 (2014–15) ===
No. overall	No. in season	Title	Original release date	US viewers (millions)
63	1	"Bright Lights, Big Breakdowns"	August 14, 2014	1.22
64	2	"Sisters on the Verge"	August 21, 2014	1.11
65	3	"Jamaican Me Crazy"	August 28, 2014	1.19
66	4	"I Ain't Scared of No Demons"	September 4, 2014	1.15
67	5	"Starting Off on a Bad Note"	September 11, 2014	1.12
68	6	"Dares & Distractions"	September 18, 2014	1.00
69	7	"A Single Decision"	September 25, 2014	0.70
70	8	"Booked to Capacity"	October 2, 2014	0.82
71	9	"Surprise Me Not"	October 9, 2014	0.85
72	10	"A Split Decision"	October 16, 2014	0.90
73	11	"Go for the Jugular!"	May 21, 2015	1.23
74	12	"Ms. E-Mergency"	May 28, 2015	1.21
75	13	"No Time to Panic!"	June 4, 2015	1.06
76	14	"Forty, Free, and On Fleek!"	June 11, 2015	1.04
77	15	"Taste For Chocolate…"	June 18, 2015	1.14
78	16	"Sisters Strike Out"	June 25, 2015	1.02
79	17	"Queens of the Everglades"	July 2, 2015	1.01
80	18	"Divine Intervention"	July 9, 2015	1.30
81	19	"One Wild Ride"	July 16, 2015	1.26
82	20	"Who's In The Hot Seat?"	July 23, 2015	1.09
83	21	"Last Call"	July 30, 2015	1.02
84	22	"It's a Family Thing"	August 6, 2015	1.09
85	23	"The Feud!"	August 13, 2015	0.96
86	24	"Restraint Thineself"	August 20, 2015	0.98
87	25	"An Engaging Question"	August 27, 2015	1.06
88	26	"Making Fetch Happen"	September 3, 2015	1.12
89	27	"Braxton Family Secrets Part 1"	November 5, 2015	0.45
90	28	"Braxton Family Secrets Part 2"	November 12, 2015	0.33

=== Season 5 (2016–17) ===
No. overall	No. in season	Title	Original release date	US viewers (millions)
91	1	"Not My Momma!"	May 19, 2016	0.84
92	2	"Man Enough for Mommy"	May 26, 2016	0.68
93	3	"Shit Gets Real!"	June 2, 2016	0.93
94	4	"Not Famous Enough"	June 9, 2016	0.93
95	5	"Oh You Tried It!"	June 16, 2016	0.66
96	6	"You Gotta Get Pelvic to Pelvic!"	June 23, 2016	0.80
97	7	"Toni Got a Ditty!"	June 30, 2016	0.78
98	8	"You Want That Thang Back?"	July 7, 2016	0.77
99	9	"Wasband's Back"	July 14, 2016	0.75
100	10	"What's the T With You and B?"	July 21, 2016	0.83
101	11	"This Is Not About ReKindlerization...or Is It?"	July 28, 2016	0.74
102	12	"Trick Thy Sister"	August 4, 2016	0.79
103	13	"Flippin' the Bird"	August 11, 2016	0.68
104	14	"Broadway or Bust"	August 18, 2016	0.71
105	15	"Spilling The Tea"	August 25, 2016	0.79
106	16	"Tabloids, Rumors, & Repercussions"	March 16, 2017	1.02
107	17	"You Run Your Mouth, I'll Run My Business"	March 23, 2017	0.88
108	18	"The Mother of All Insults"	March 30, 2017	0.84
109	19	"Bird on the Brain"	April 6, 2017	0.90
110	20	"Back In The Hot Seat"	April 13, 2017	0.80
111	21	"Pop Up, Pop Off"	April 20, 2017	0.76
112	22	"Opposing Counsel"	April 27, 2017	0.85
113	23	"Donde Esta Daddy?"	May 4, 2017	0.74
114	24	"The Other Mrs. Braxton"	May 11, 2017	0.86
115	25	"After the Storm"	May 18, 2017	0.83
116	26	"There's Something About Mommy"	May 25, 2017	0.91

=== Season 6 (2018–19) ===
No. overall	No. in season	Title	Original release date	US viewers (millions)
117	1	"The Duchess & the Divorce"	March 22, 2018	0.92
118	2	"Allegedly"	March 29, 2018	0.79
119	3	"Living Legend"	April 5, 2018	0.89
120	4	"Law & Order"	April 12, 2018	0.83
121	5	"Don't Rock the Boat"	April 19, 2018	0.85
122	6	"Braxtons Under Fire"	April 26, 2018	0.87
123	7	"Plus One, Plus Drama"	May 3, 2018	0.81
124	8	"Shattered Dreams"	May 10, 2018	0.86
125	9	"Toni-Zilla"	August 16, 2018	0.60
126	10	"Sister Shutdown"	August 23, 2018	0.56
127	11	"Traci vs. Sisters"	August 30, 2018	0.63
128	12	"Wellness Hell"	September 6, 2018	0.44
129	13	"Duchess & The Dude Ranch"	September 13, 2018	0.60
130	14	"Not Today Satan"	September 20, 2018	0.58
131	15	"Hot Bed of Crazy"	September 27, 2018	0.71
132	16	"Truth & Consequences"	October 4, 2018	0.89
133	17	"A New Beginning?"	April 4, 2019	0.64
134	18	"Tamar's Mystery Man"	April 11, 2019	0.65
135	19	"Sister Secrets"	April 18, 2019	0.59
136	20	"Touring Us Apart"	April 25, 2019	0.60
137	21	"Trouble in Paradise"	May 2, 2019	0.55
138	22	"Off Again, On Again?"	May 9, 2019	0.58
139	23	"Grammys & Gossip"	May 16, 2019	0.56
140	24	"Secrets & Rumors"	May 23, 2019	0.57
141	25	"Whine Country"	May 30, 2019	0.58
142	26	"Engaged & Enraged"	June 6, 2019	0.76

=== Season 7 (2020) ===
No. overall	No. in season	Title	Original release date	US viewers (millions)
143	1	"Bachelorette Braxton Style"	November 5, 2020	0.41
144	2	"A Stumble to the Altar"	November 12, 2020	0.47
145	3	"Third Times a Charm"	November 19, 2020	0.46
146	4	"Love After Lockdown"	December 3, 2020	0.41
147	5	"Life Goes On"	December 10, 2020	0.38
148	6	"Sister Staycation"	December 17, 2020	0.35
