= On Earth =

Studio album by Traci Braxton
- Released: August 24, 2018
- Recorded: 2015–2018
- Genre: R&B
- Length: 32:54
- Label: Soul World Entertainment EMPIRE

Traci Braxton chronology
Crash & Burn (2014)	On Earth (2018)

Singles from On Earth
- 1. "Lifeline" Released: August 5, 2018

On Earth is the second and final studio album by American singer Traci Braxton, released on August 24, 2018, through Soul World Entertainment. Preceded by the release of the commercial single "Lifeline" and the promotional single "Broken Things" (the latter featuring her sisters Toni, Towanda and Trina), the album features production by Dave "DaveyBoy" Lindsey (Monica, Missy Elliott) and production duo Chris N Teeb (Jennifer Lopez, Danity Kane).

== Background and release ==
Following the release of her debut studio album Crash & Burn (2014), work began on her second studio album in late 2015. On May 17, 2016, during a Facebook live video on the Braxton Family Values page it was announced that Braxton would release a new single in 2016 titled "Body Shots" from her upcoming second studio album. On an episode of Braxton Family Values, Braxton and her sisters Toni, Towanda and Trina Braxton recorded "Broken Things" in the studio which was later added to the album. On March 23, 2018, on Soul World Entertainment's YouTube channel, uploaded two short episodes of a behind the scenes look on the recording process of the album titled "Traci Braxton Now or Never".

"Broken Things" was released as a buzz single to promote the upcoming release of On Earth on April 11, 2018. On August 3, 2018, Braxton released her official lead single, "Lifeline". On August 17, 2018, Braxton announced via social media that On Earth was available for pre-order, announcing the release date, August 24, 2018. Two days later, Braxton revealed the album cover on her social media pages.

Upon release, the album debuted at number 24 on the Billboard R&B Album Sales chart.

== Singles ==
"Lifeline" was released as the album's lead single on August 5, 2018.

=== Promotional songs ===
"Broken Things" featuring Toni Braxton, Towanda Braxton and Trina Braxton was released as the album's promotional single on April 11, 2018, via several streaming services.

== Track listing ==
On Earth
No.	Title	Writer(s)	Producer(s)	Length
1.	"On Earth"	Kim Udeozor	Dave "DaveyBoy" Lindsey	5:23
2.	"Lifeline"	Nyerere "Nye the Songwrita" Davidson; Mariam Aquarium	Dave Lindsey	4:08
3.	"Boy Bye"	Nye the Songwrita, Cameron Proctor	Dave Lindsey	3:44
4.	"Broken Things" (featuring Toni Braxton, Towanda Braxton and Trina Braxton)	Kim Udeozor	Dave Lindsey	3:51
5.	"Out the Box"	Nye the Songwrita	Chris N Teeb	3:21
6.	"To the Side"	Nye the Songwrita, Cameron Proctor		3:20
7.	"White Noise"	Nye the Songwrita, Anesha Birchett	Dave Lindsey	3:53
8.	"I Won't Cry"	Kim Udeozor	Dave Lindsey	4:07
Total length:				32:54

== Release history ==
Region	Date	Format	Label	Ref.
Various	August 24, 2018	Digital download	Soul World Entertainment	
