= Braxton Family Values season 6 =

Braxton Family Values
- Season 6
- Cover used by the iTunes Store
- Starring: Toni Braxton; Traci Braxton; Towanda Braxton; Trina Braxton; Tamar Braxton; Evelyn Braxton

Release
- Original network: WE tv
- Original release: March 22, 2018 – June 6, 2019

Season chronology
- ← Previous; Season 5 Next → Season 7

The sixth season of Braxton Family Values, an American reality television series, was broadcast on WE tv. It premiered on March 22, 2018, and was primarily filmed in Atlanta, Georgia and Los Angeles, California. Its executive producers are Toni Braxton, Tamar Braxton, Dan Cutforth, Jane Lipsitz, Julio Kollerbohm, Michelle Kongkasuwan, Lauren Gellert, Annabelle McDonald, and Sitarah Pendleton.

Braxton Family Values focuses on the lives of Toni Braxton and her sisters — Tamar, Traci, Towanda, and Trina — and their mother, Evelyn.

== Production ==
On July 19, 2017, Trina Braxton said in a radio interview with ET Cali that they had just started filming the sixth season of Braxton Family Values.

On December 20, 2017, Traci Braxton revealed on Instagram that the sixth season of BFV is "coming real soon".

On December 28, 2017, We TV aired the seventh and last episode of the fifth season of Tamar & Vince and released a teaser clip for the next season of BFV.

On June 27, 2018, it was reported that BFV would go on an indefinite hiatus after Toni, Towanda, Trina, Tamar, and Evelyn did not show up to film in Atlanta due to being underpaid. On July 19, 2018, WE tv announced that the remainder of the season would begin to air on August 16, 2018.

After a family sit-down with Iyanla Vanzant, all five sisters returned to filming. The final ten episodes of Season 6 began airing in April 2019.

Tamar appeared in 20 episodes out of 26 this season. Reality television stars Natalie Nunn, Phaedra Parks, and Tiffany Pollard made guest appearances on this season. Comedian Luenell, actress Kim Whitley, and rapper Flavor Flav also made guest appearances.

== Episodes ==
No. overall	No. in season	Title	Original release date	US viewers (millions)
117	1	"The Duchess & the Divorce"	March 22, 2018	0.92
118	2	"Allegedly"	March 29, 2018	0.79
119	3	"Living Legend"	April 5, 2018	0.89
120	4	"Law & Order"	April 12, 2018	0.83
121	5	"Don't Rock the Boat"	April 19, 2018	0.85
122	6	"Braxtons Under Fire"	April 26, 2018	0.87
123	7	"Plus One, Plus Drama"	May 3, 2018	0.81
124	8	"Shattered Dreams"	May 10, 2018	0.86
125	9	"Toni-Zilla"	August 16, 2018	0.60
126	10	"Sister Shutdown"	August 23, 2018	0.56
127	11	"Traci vs. Sisters"	August 30, 2018	0.63
128	12	"Wellness Hell"	September 6, 2018	0.44
129	13	"Duchess & The Dude Ranch"	September 13, 2018	0.60
130	14	"Not Today Satan"	September 20, 2018	0.58
131	15	"Hot Bed of Crazy"	September 27, 2018	0.71
132	16	"Truth & Consequences"	October 4, 2018	0.89
133	17	"A New Beginning?"	April 4, 2019	0.64
134	18	"Tamar's Mystery Man"	April 11, 2019	0.65
135	19	"Sister Secrets"	April 18, 2019	0.59
136	20	"Touring Us Apart"	April 25, 2019	0.60
137	21	"Trouble in Paradise"	May 2, 2019	0.55
138	22	"Off Again, On Again?"	May 9, 2019	0.58
139	23	"Grammys & Gossip"	May 16, 2019	0.56
140	24	"Secrets & Rumors"	May 23, 2019	0.57
141	25	"Whine Country"	May 30, 2019	0.58
142	26	"Engaged & Enraged"	June 6, 2019	0.76
