= Braxton Family Values season 3 =

Braxton Family Values
- Season 3
- Starring: Toni Braxton; Traci Braxton; Towanda Braxton; Trina Braxton; Tamar Braxton; Evelyn Braxton
- No. of episodes: 26

Release
- Original network: WE tv
- Original release: March 14, 2013 – February 20, 2014

Season chronology
- ← Previous; Season 2 Next → Season 4

The third season of Braxton Family Values, an American reality television series, was broadcast on WE tv. The series aired from March 14, 2013 until February 20, 2014, consisting of 26 episodes.

Its executive producers were Toni Braxton, Tamar Braxton, Vincent Herbert, Dan Cutforth, Jane Lipsitz, Julio Kollerbohm, Michelle Kongkasuwan, Lauren Gellert, Annabelle McDonald and Sitarah Pendelton.

Season 3 averaged 1.4 million viewers.

== Production ==
Braxton Family Values was officially renewed for its third season in July 2012, announced by WE tv. A teaser trailer for the season was released on WE tv's YouTube channel on February 28, 2013. The third season returned on November 14, 2013, following its four-month hiatus.

== Episodes ==
No. overall	No. in season	Title	Original release date	US viewers (millions)
37	1	"Ciao, Braxtons!"	March 14, 2013	1.01
Toni invites Tamar on a fabulous sister trip to Italy, but Tamar can’t go because she has a press tour in NYC to promote her newly released single, Love and War. Toni, Trina, Towanda and Traci arrive in Italy, and Toni steals away to buy Towanda a last minute birthday cake. In New York, Tamar performs on The Wendy Williams Show. Toni, Towanda, Trina and Traci visit a vineyard in Ravello, where the girls learn to stomp grapes and Toni takes a big fall. During a boat tour along the coast, Trina channels her inner-European and goes topless.
38	2	"Lights, Camera, Braxton Drama"	March 21, 2013	0.92
The girls and Evelyn fly to Canada to visit Toni who’s on location for her first leading role in a movie. Since tensions have been high between Tamar and the other sisters, Evelyn is thrilled to see all her daughters together again. The women find the smell of the country location unbearable, but they have fun touring the church set and reminiscing about their childhood.
39	3	"The Tamar-vention"	March 28, 2013	0.95
An emergency therapy session is called so that the sisters can hash out their issues. Also: Toni performs at a gala honoring Barry Manilow; and Tamar, still busy promoting her new single, shoots a music video.
40	4	"Papa Knows Best"	April 4, 2013	0.92
Gabe receives help from Toni and Traci picking out a ring for Trina; and Michael calls a family meeting in an effort to put an end to the fighting between his daughters.
41	5	"Traci's Bustin' Out!"	April 11, 2013	0.94
Trina asks her sisters to be involved in the opening of her new store in Atlanta, but inadvertently stirs up drama by not including her mom. Meanwhile, Traci is nervous about delivering a speech in front of a large crowd; and Toni considers giving up her music career.
42	6	"Party in the DMV"	April 18, 2013	1.17
Traci toys with the idea of buying a gun and draws criticism from her sisters. Later, a gathering of extended family turns ugly.
43	7	"A Diva's Dilemma"	April 25, 2013	0.89
Trina angers her sisters by changing plans for the store she's opening; Tamar offers Evelyn some tips on how to attract a man; and a charity event is marked by embarrassment.
44	8	"What's Cookin' in the Oven?"	May 2, 2013	0.88
Tamar shares her pregnancy news with the family; Trina takes part in a cook-off and tries to convince Gabe to move to Los Angeles.
45	9	"Hello Baby, Goodbye Dog"	May 9, 2013	0.98
Tamar has an appointment with her obstetrician; Towanda takes an interest in her daughter becoming a ballerina; Trina has her son learn martial arts to defend himself against bullies at school; and Evelyn makes a big announcement.
46	10	"Sister Act"	May 16, 2013	0.82
The ladies take Tamar to her first parenting class; and Trina prepares for a big performance with Toni.
47	11	"Go Hard or Go Home!"	May 23, 2013	0.79
Tamar and Toni have harsh criticism for Trina who, along with Traci, is keeping busy playing solo engagements. Meanwhile, Towanda thinks she has found the perfect new assistant for Tamar.
48	12	"Braxton Leading Lady"	May 30, 2013	0.88
Evelyn starts dating again; and a business decision by Trina elicits a dramatic response from the family.
49	13	"Rumor Has It"	June 6, 2013	0.95
Toni comes to a decision about her music career and causes a minor disruption at Tamar's baby shower, while Traci's strange behavior leads to a shocking revelation.
50	14	"A Very Public Affair"	November 14, 2013	1.28
Toni works with Babyface on her single, while Tamar promotes her new album, and Traci and Trina face questions about their marriages at the Essence Festival.
51	15	"I Don't Have No Baby"	November 21, 2013	1.03
Traci confronts Kevin over rumors that he fathered an illegitimate son, and gives her gossiping sisters a piece of her mind. Meanwhile, both Toni and Tamar are getting ready for tours, plus Tamar's got a big apology to deliver.
52	16	"Back To Braxton Business"	November 28, 2013	0.80
Toni feels under pressure as she prepares to tour for the first time in five years, while Tamar feels under the weather as she rehearses for upcoming gigs promoting her album. Elsewhere, Traci is hired to host a radio show.
53	17	"Tour De Divas"	December 5, 2013	0.83
Toni battles nerves and Trina struggles with her background singing duties before the start of the tour. Meanwhile, Tamar shoots an over-the-top music video.
54	18	"Birthday-Zilla"	December 12, 2013	1.05
The sisters return home after touring with Toni; Towanda's 40th birthday brings out her demanding side as she makes plans for a big celebration and clashes with Tamar; and Trina collaborates with Gabe on a new business ventured called Bar Chix.
55	19	"Birthday Bare-All"	December 19, 2013	1.33
Towanda throws an epic 40th birthday party. She also poses nude, fires Trina and gets an earful from Tamar. Elsewhere, Toni and Babyface rehearse for their tour.
56	20	"#Wack #Family"	January 9, 2014	1.24
Tensions between Tamar and Towanda lead to a showdown mediated by Toni, who has her hands full shooting the "Hurt You" music video with Babyface. Also: Tamar goes on "The Arsenio Hall Show."
57	21	"They Threw A Shoe At You?!?"	January 16, 2014	0.96
Tamar throws a birthday party for Toni, who pushes her sisters too far in a ballroom-dance class; at the same time, Mama Evelyn battles a stalker.
58	22	"Chix in a Row"	January 23, 2014	1.40
Toni performs at the 30th Annual Breeders' Cup in Arcadia, Cal., and gets to work writing her biography; Tamar asks her sisters to join her on tour; Trina juggles Gabe and her Bar Chix launch party; and Traci hits the studio to record her album.
59	23	"Shade Anonymous"	January 30, 2014	1.12
Trina hits the road to join Tamar on tour, but Tamar's upset by the absence of her other sisters and Vince, who's visiting doctors. Elsewhere, Toni and Babyface talk about their careers; and Traci tries to get out of a ticket after she and Toni are pulled over by the police.
60	24	"Who Wants To Be A Braxton?"	February 6, 2014	1.19
The sisters compete on "Who Wants to Be a Millionaire" for charity.
61	25	"Award Show Shade!"	February 13, 2014	1.29
Tamar is honored at the Soul Train Awards and snags three Grammy nominations. She also has her sisters sign a record contract, but her feud with Towanda continues, even as Trina, who's busy back in the studio, tries to broker a peace between them.
62	26	"It's All Good!"	February 20, 2014	1.11
Season 3 ends with Tamar attending the Grammys; and Vince throwing an after-party using Trina's Bar Chix service. Later, Towanda and Evelyn have a heart-to-heart talk; a birthday is celebrated; plus there is a surprise christening.
