= Braxton Family Values season 1 =

Braxton Family Values
- Season 1
- DVD cover of Season 1
- Starring: Toni Braxton; Traci Braxton; Towanda Braxton; Trina Braxton; Tamar Braxton; Evelyn Braxton
- No. of episodes: 11

Release
- Original network: WE tv
- Original release: April 12 – June 14, 2011

Season chronology
- Next → Season 2

The first season of Braxton Family Values, an American reality television series, was broadcast on WE tv. The series aired from April 12, 2011 until June 14, 2011, consisting of 11 s episodes.

== Production ==
In January 2011, WE tv confirmed that it had signed Toni Braxton for a reality series, entitled Braxton Family Values, which is marketed as one of the network's flagship shows. In its first four airings, Braxton Family Values averaged a 0.63 household rating, attracting 350,000 women in the 18–49 demographic, three times WE tv's average in the Tuesday 9 PM slot. Braxton Family Values was renewed for a second season on May 10, 2011.

Originally the show was supposed to be on Bravo Television Channel and was slated to air in the fall of 2010. On February 12, 2010, Toni Braxton announced its premiere during an interview with Rap- Up Tv.

== Synopsis ==
Braxton Family Values; Five sisters. Only one spotlight. Like their famous sister Toni Braxton, Traci, Towanda, Trina and Tamar were all blessed with singing talent and shared that gift as a group, The Braxtons, managed by their mom, Evelyn. Fast forward a few years and Toni is a megastar with hit after hit and millions of albums sold. Meanwhile, Traci documents her life in Maryland; Towanda pursues acting; Trina becomes a backup for Toni and a part-time wedding singer; and Tamar is working on getting her star to rise with her husband, Vince, a successful music industry executive. See if their super-close sisterly bond and unconditional love can get them through the ups and downs of life in the fab lane.

=== U.S. television ratings ===
The season's premiere episode "The Bermuda Triangle" attracted over 1.25 million viewers during its initial broadcast on April 12, 2011, including 0.700 thousand viewers in the 18–49 demographic via Nielsen ratings.

== Episodes ==
| No. overall | No. in season | Title | Original release date | US viewers (millions) |
|---|---|---|---|---|
| 1 | 1 | "The Bermuda Triangle" | April 12, 2011 | 1.25 |
R&B star Toni Braxton enlists her sisters' help for a performance in Bermuda in the premiere of this reality series following the Braxton sisters as they pursue careers in entertainment. Their efforts don't go smoothly, however, when tensions arise during rehearsals.
| 2 | 2 | "Taste of a Wedding Singer" | April 19, 2011 | 1.99 |
The sisters plan an intervention following Trina's DUI. The tension only rises, however, when the ladies make fun of Trina for singing in a cover band. Elsewhere, Towanda clashes with her husband over financial matters.
| 3 | 3 | "It's My Birthday" | April 26, 2011 | 2.05 |
The ladies celebrate Toni's birthday with a trip to Miami; Tamar is upset when Toni cancels plans to go clubbing and picks a fight at dinner.
| 4 | 4 | "I Love L.A." | May 3, 2011 | 1.96 |
Toni reveals she has lupus at an awards ceremony in Los Angeles. Elsewhere, Tamar and Trina fight again; Evelyn receives a surprise; and Traci brushes up on her manners.
| 5 | 5 | "From Russia With Love" | May 10, 2011 | 2.18 |
Toni prepares for a concert in Russia; Towanda steps in for Tamar to sing backup for Toni; and Trina's marriage hits a rough patch.
| 6 | 6 | "Getting the Band Back Together" | May 17, 2011 | 2.21 |
The ladies consider recording a family album; Towanda moves in with Toni and reveals a secret; and Trina considers buying property with her husband.
| 7 | 7 | "Dog of a Birthday Party" | May 24, 2011 | 1.08 |
The ladies go to Los Angeles for their mom's birthday, but a fight threatens to ruin the trip. Elsewhere, Toni considers moving to Los Angeles.
| 8 | 8 | "To Play or Not to Playboy" | May 31, 2011 | 2.91 |
Toni considers posing nude for a photo shoot, but Tamar is against the idea. Elsewhere, Evelyn goes on a blind date; and Tamar tries to persuade Vince to do her a favor.
| 9 | 9 | "You Can't Go Home Again" | June 7, 2011 | 0.69 |
The sisters go to Maryland to visit their father, but the trip doesn't go as planned.
| 10 | 10 | "Guess Who's Coming to Dinner" | June 14, 2011 | 1.06 |
In the first-season finale, the ladies' father attends a family dinner, where he has a showdown with Evelyn. Elsewhere, Towanda decides to separate from her husband, and Toni makes a big decision that could affect her sisters' careers.
