= The Boss (Diana Ross song) =

1979 song by Diana Ross

- German 7" vinyl

Single by Diana Ross

from the album The Boss
- B-side: "I'm in the World"
- Released: May 22, 1979
- Recorded: 1979
- Genre: Disco
- Length: 3:52
- Label: Motown
- Songwriter: Nickolas Ashford & Valerie Simpson
- Producers: Nickolas Ashford & Valerie Simpson

Diana Ross singles chronology
"What You Gave Me" (1979)	"The Boss" (1979)	"No One Gets the Prize" (1979)

"The Boss" is a 1979 song written and produced by Ashford & Simpson and recorded by American singer Diana Ross, who released it as a single on the Motown label. It was the first release from the album of the same title (1979). The song was released on May 22, 1979, a day before the album release.

== Commercial performance ==
The single peaked at number 19 on the Billboard Hot 100 chart, reached #12 on the Hot Soul Singles chart, and went to number 1 on the Billboard Hot Dance Club Play chart.

The song debuted at number 64 in the UK Singles Chart on July 21, 1979, reaching its highest peak on August 4, 1979. The song spent 7 weeks in the top 75 before leaving the chart on September 1, 1979.

== Formats ==
The track was remixed by David Morales in 1993 and included on Ross' album Diana Extended: The Remixes. The track was also remixed by Almighty Records in 2009 and was included on their album "Almighty – We Love Diana Ross". In 2019, a remix by Eric Kupper, entitled "The Boss 2019" went to number one on the Billboard, US Dance Club Songs chart.

== Usage in media ==
"The Boss" was featured as a lip sync song on the third and eleventh seasons of RuPaul's Drag Race All Stars. BeBe Zahara Benet and Trixie Mattel performed the lip sync on the fifth episode of season 3, with Benet winning. A'keria C. Davenport and Joey Jay performed a lip sync to the song during the finale of season eleven; Jay won and eliminated Davenport from the competition.

== Personnel ==
- Lead vocals by Diana Ross
- Background vocals by Nickolas Ashford, Valerie Simpson, Maxine and Julia Waters
- Produced and written by Ashford & Simpson

== Charts ==
=== Weekly charts ===
Chart (1979)	Peak position
Canada Top Singles (RPM)	48
Canada Adult Contemporary (RPM)	1
Canada Dance/Urban (RPM)	8
UK Singles (OCC)	40
US Billboard Hot 100	19
US Adult Contemporary (Billboard)	41
US Hot Disco Singles (Billboard)	1
US Hot Soul Singles (Billboard)	12
US Cash Box Top 100	21

=== Year-end charts ===
Chart (1979)	Rank
US Top Pop Singles (Billboard)	97

== The Braxtons version ==
"The Boss"

Single by The Braxtons

from the album So Many Ways
- Released: March 17, 1997
- Recorded: 1996
- Length: 9:41 (album version); 4:27 (video version); 4:13 (radio edit)
- Label: Atlantic
- Songwriter: Ashford & Simpson
- Producers: Kenny Dope; "Little" Louie Vega

The Braxtons singles chronology
"Only Love" (1997)	"The Boss" (1997)	"Slow Flow" (1997)

American R&B group the Braxtons released a cover of "The Boss" in 1997. The song was written by Ashford & Simpson and produced by Kenny "Dope" Gonzalez and "Little" Louie Vega. It was released on March 17, 1997 as the third single from their first studio album, So Many Ways (1996).

=== Critical reception ===
In his review of the So Many Ways album, Peter Miro from Cash Box wrote, "Can't say "The Boss" by Diana Ross belongs on the collection, unless it's there to appeal to a techno-oriented dance crowd. Its straight-up hip-hop intro would have made a nice tune if it was fleshed out, but the rest of it sounds incongruous on this otherwise tranquil, luxuriant disc." Jeremy Newall from Music Week's RM Dance Update praised the track, rating it five out of five. He added, "Live bass, real strings and disco drums capture the lush feeling of the original in breathtaking style."

=== Commercial performance ===
On February 1, 1997 the Masters At Work produced track topped the Billboard Hot Dance Club Play chart for one week a #1 in the United States. The song stayed in the chart for 14 weeks.

On March 29, 1997, the song debuted at number 31 on the UK Singles Chart. The song spent a total of three weeks on the chart at numbers 50 and 69 respectively before leaving the Top 75 on April 12, 1997, becoming their second top 40 in the UK.

=== Music video ===
A music video was produced to promote the single. The video starts with Towanda Braxton kissing her husband goodbye as he rushes off to work. Then, Towanda is shown in a living room with Trina Braxton and Tamar Braxton singing and dancing.

The video also shows The Braxtons talking on the phone to each other and singing by a tree. The plot of the video revolves around Towanda acquiring photos of her husband with another woman, and after he leaves for work, the sisters have a garage sale clearing out the entire house. The video ends with Towanda's husband coming home to an empty house with the pictures left in an envelope on the floor.

=== Credits ===
- Producer, Mixed by – Kenny "Dope" Gonzalez, "Little" Louie Vega*
- Executive producer – Bryant Reid

=== Track listings and formats ===
- US 12" vinyl single
1. "The Boss" (Kenlou Mix) – 9:03
2. "Only Love" (Radio Mix) – 4:13
3. "The Boss" (Masters at Work Dub) – 7:15
4. "The Boss" (MAW Album Mix) – 9:41
5. "The Boss" (MAW Groove) – 7:33
- US, UK 12" vinyl promo
1. "The Boss" (Kenlou Mix)- 9:03
2. "The Boss" (Kenlou Radio Mix) – 4:13
3. "The Boss" (Masters at Work Dub) – 7:15
4. "The Boss" (Reprise) – 6:12
5. "The Boss" (MAW Album Mix) – 9:41
6. "The Boss" (Hip Hop Vocal) – 1:33
7. "The Boss" (MAW Groove) – 7:33
- US, CD, 12" vinyl maxi-single promo
1. "The Boss" (Radio Edit of Album) – 3:32
2. "The Boss" (Spyda Mix with Rap Radio Edit) – 4:21
3. "The Boss" (Spyda Mix without Rap Radio Edit) – 4:23
4. "The Boss" (H.O.P. Quiet Storm Mix Radio Edit) – 4:20
- UK 12" vinyl single
1. "The Boss" (Masters at Work Album Mix) – 9:40
2. "The Boss" (Reprise) – 6:12
3. "The Boss" (Kenlou Mix) – 9:03
4. "The Boss" (Masters at Work Dub) – 7:15
- Europe, Australia CD maxi-single
1. "The Boss" (Kenlou Radio Mix) – 4:13
2. "The Boss" (Kenlou Mix)- 9:03
3. "The Boss" (Masters at Work Album Mix) – 9:40
4. "The Boss" (Masters at Work Dub) – 7:15
5. "The Boss" (Reprise) – 6:12
- Germany CD single
1. "The Boss" (Kenlou Radio Mix) – 4:13
2. "The Boss" (Kenlou Mix)- 9:03
3. "The Boss" (Masters at Work Album Mix) – 9:40

=== Charts ===
Chart (1997)	Peak position
Iceland (Íslenski Listinn Topp 40)	20
Netherlands (Dutch Top 40)	26
Netherlands (Single Top 100)	24
New Zealand (Recorded Music NZ)	10
Scotland (OCC)	49
UK Singles (OCC)	31
UK Dance (OCC)	6
US Hot Dance Club Play (Billboard)	1

=== Release history ===
Region	Date	Format	Label	Ref
United States	Late 1996	Vinyl 12", Promo	Atlantic Records	
United Kingdom	Late 1996	Vinyl 12", Promo	Atlantic Records	
United States	1997	CD	Atlantic Records	
Europe	1997	CD	Atlantic Records	
Germany	1997	CD	Atlantic Records	
Australia	1997	CD	Warner Music Australia	

== Other cover versions ==
On February 12, 2008, American dance-pop singer Kristine W released a cover of this song as the first single off her album The Power of Music. Kristine's version also hit number one on the Billboard Hot Dance Club Play chart in March 2008, becoming her eleventh US dance chart-topper and the third version of the song to top that chart.

The song was covered by Ashford and Simpson during a televised live concert special in 1982, and by Whitney Houston during her live shows in 1997 and 1998.

Korean pop singer J covered the song on her 2001 special English album Chocolate.

Louise performed the song on her Heavy Love Tour in 2020.

== See also ==
- List of number-one dance singles of 1979 (U.S.)
- List of Billboard number-one dance songs of 2019
