= Only Love (The Braxtons song) =

Single by The Braxtons

from the album So Many Ways
- B-side: "So Many Ways (featuring Jay-Z)"
- Released: January 25, 1997
- Recorded: 1996
- Genre: R&B
- Length: 4:25
- Label: Atlantic
- Songwriters: Andrea Martin, Ivan Matias
- Producer: Allen "Allstar" Gordon

The Braxtons singles chronology
"So Many Ways" (1996)	"Only Love" (1997)	"The Boss" (1997)

"Only Love" is the second single by The Braxtons taken from their debut album So Many Ways. The song was written by Andrea Martin and Ivan Matias and was produced by Allen "Allstar" Gordon. The song contains backing vocals from Andrea Martin and Traci Braxton.

The song charted at #52 on Billboard's Hot R&B/Hip-Hop Songs spending fourteen weeks in total on the chart. The song charted at #3 on New Zealands Top 40 chart.

== Track listings and formats ==
US CD Promo

1. "Only Love" (Radio Edit) - 4:10
2. "Only Love" (LP Version) - 4:25

US CD

1. "Only Love" (LP Version) - 3:56
2. "So Many Ways" (Remix) (feat. Jay-Z) - 5:37

US Cassette Single

1. A1 "Only Love" (LP Version)
2. A2 "So Many Ways" (Remix) (feat. Jay-Z)
3. B1 "Only Love" (LP Version)
4. B2 "So Many Ways" (Remix) (feat. Jay-Z)

== Chart positions ==
=== Weekly charts ===
Chart (1997)	Peak position
New Zealand (RIANZ)	3
US Hot R&B/Hip-Hop Songs (Billboard)	52

=== Year-end charts ===
Chart (1997)	Position
New Zealand (Recorded Music NZ)	22
