= Slow Flow =

Single by The Braxtons

from the album So Many Ways
- B-side: "L.A.D.I"
- Released: July 2, 1997
- Recorded: 1996
- Length: 4:25
- Label: Atlantic
- Songwriter(s): Sean "Sep" Hall; London Jones; Christopher "Tricky" Stewart
- Producer(s): Allen "Allstar" Gordon

The Braxtons singles chronology
| "The Boss" (1997) | "Slow Flow" (1997) | "Everyday is Christmas" (2015) |

"Slow Flow" is the fourth and final single by The Braxtons taken from their debut album So Many Ways. The song was written by Sean "Sep" Hall, London Jones, Christopher "Tricky" Stewart, and produced by Allen "Allstar" Gordon.

The song failed to chart in the U.S. but charted at #26 on UK Singles Chart becoming their highest chart to date. The song also charted in New Zealand at #38 on New Zealand Singles Chart.

== Track listings and formats ==
U.S. CD Promo 1996

1. "Slow Flow" – 4:25

CD Single 1996

1. "Slow Flow" (Radio Edit) – 3:56
2. "L.A.D.I." (LP Version) – 4:12
3. "24/7" (Non-LP Bonus Track) – 4:27

Europe and Germany CD Single 1996

1. "Slow Flow" (Radio Edit) – 3:56
2. "L.A.D.I." (LP Version) – 4:12
3. "24/7" (Non-LP Bonus Track) – 4:27

U.S. Vinyl 12" Single 1996

1. A1 "Slow Flow" – 4:24
2. A2 "Slow Flow (Radio Edit)" – 3:56
3. B1 "L.A.D.I." – 4:12
4. B2 "24/7" – 4:27

U.S. CD Single 1996

1. "Slow Flow" – 3:56
2. "L.A.D.I." – 4:12

UK CD Single 1997

1. "Slow Flow" (Radio Edit) – 3:56
2. "L.A.D.I." (LP Version) – 4:12
3. "24/7" (Non-LP Bonus Track) – 4:27

== Charts ==
| Chart (1997) | Peak position |
|---|---|
| Germany (GfK) | 83 |
| Netherlands (Dutch Top 40 Tipparade) | 2 |
| Netherlands (Single Top 100) | 49 |
| New Zealand (Recorded Music NZ) | 38 |
| Scotland (OCC) | 70 |
| UK Singles (OCC) | 26 |
| UK Dance (OCC) | 17 |
| UK Hip Hop/R&B (OCC) | 7 |
