= High School High (soundtrack) =

Music from and Inspired by the Motion Picture High School High

High School High: The Soundtrack

Soundtrack album by Various artists
- Released: August 19, 1996
- Genres: Hip-hop; R&B
- Label: Big Beat
- Producers: Craig Kallman (exec.); Jolene Cherry (exec.); Tim Sexton (exec.); RZA; Allstar; Andy Blakelock; Ajb; Baby Paul; Bob Power; Carlos "6 July" Broady; Dante Ross; De La Soul; Eric Valentine; Grand Negaz; Gmoney; Grand Puba; Jay "Ski" McGowan; Jermaine Dupri; K-Def; KRS-One; Large Professor; Mr. Dalvin; Nashiem Myrick; Pete Rock; Sadat X; Scarface; Sean Combs; Stephan Jenkins; Stevie J; Studio Ton; The Ummah; Thrill da Playa; Carl So-Lowe (co.); Mike Dean (co.)

Singles from High School High
- 1. "So Many Ways" Released: July 23, 1996; 2. "Wu-Wear: The Garment Renaissance" Released: July 30, 1996; 3. "I Got Somebody Else" Released: September 3, 1996; 4. "Bohemian Rhapsody" Released: October 1, 1996

Professional ratings
Review scores
Source	Rating
AllMusic	4/5 stars
RapReviews	7/10

High School High: The Soundtrack is the soundtrack to Hart Bochner's 1996 film High School High. It was released on August 19, 1996, through Big Beat Records, and consists of hip-hop and R&B music. The album features performances by the likes of A Tribe Called Quest, Artifacts, Changing Faces, D'Angelo, De La Soul, Erykah Badu, Facemob, Faith Evans, Grand Puba, Jodeci, KRS-One, Large Professor, Lil' Kim, Pete Rock, Real Live, Sadat X, Scarface, Spice 1, The Braxtons, The Braids, The Click, The Roots, Quad City DJ's, and Wu-Tang Clan members.

Several songs heard both in the movie and in the closing credits, such as "Top of the World" by The Carpenters, "Stay With Me" by Art 'N Soul, "Rhinestone Cowboy" by Glen Campbell, "Froggy Style" by Nuttin' Nyce, "Troubleneck Wreck" by the Troubleneck Brothers, "Still In Love" by Ricky Jones, were not included in the soundtrack album.

The soundtrack peaked at number 20 on the Billboard 200 and at number 4 on the Top R&B/Hip-Hop Albums chart in the United States. It was certified gold by the Recording Industry Association of America on October 23, 1996.

Complex placed the album at number 18 on their '25 Best Hip-Hop Movie Soundtracks Of All Time'.

== Track listing ==
No.	Title	Producer(s)	Length
1.	"So Many Ways" (performed by The Braxtons)	Jermaine Dupri; Carl So-Lowe (co.)	3:56
2.	"I Got Somebody Else" (performed by Changing Faces)	Allen "AllStar" Gordon; Andy Blakelock	4:17
3.	"Wu-Wear: The Garment Renaissance" (performed by RZA, Method Man and Cappadonna)	RZA	3:55
4.	"Get Down for Mine" (performed by Real Live)	K-Def	4:00
5.	"I Just Can't" (performed by Faith Evans)	Sean "Puffy" Combs; Stevie J	3:43
6.	"Your Precious Love" (performed by D'Angelo and Erykah Badu)	Bob Power	4:11
7.	"The Rap World" (performed by Large Professor and Pete Rock)	Large Professor; Pete Rock	4:03
8.	"Queen Bitch" (performed by Lil' Kim)	Carlos "Six July" Broady; Nashiem Myrick	3:17
9.	"Why You Wanna Funk?" (performed by Spice 1, The Click and Marcus Gore)	Studio Ton	4:08
10.	"I Can't Call It" (performed by De La Soul)	De La Soul	3:28
11.	"Bohemian Rhapsody" (performed by The Braids)	Eric Valentine; Stephan Jenkins	4:00
12.	"High School Rock" (performed by KRS-One)	KRS-One	3:35
13.	"Peace, Prosperity & Paper" (performed by A Tribe Called Quest)	The Ummah	4:01
14.	"Wild Side" (performed by Jodeci)	Mr. Dalvin	3:45
15.	"The Ultimate (You Know the Time)" (performed by Artifacts)	Baby Paul • Ajb • Gmoney	4:12
16.	"The Next Spot" (performed by Sadat X and Grand Puba)	Dante Ross; Grand Puba; Sadat X	3:46
17.	"Skrilla" (performed by Scarface and Facemob)	Scarface; Mike Dean (co.)	3:45
18.	"Semi-Automatic: Full Rap Metal Jacket" (performed by Inspectah Deck, U-God and Streetlife)	RZA	4:01
19.	"The Good, the Bad and the Desolate" (performed by The Roots)	Grand Negaz	4:06
20.	"C'Mon N' Ride It (The Train-Part II) Bass Remix" (performed by Quad City DJ's)	Jay "Ski" McGowan; Thrill Da Playa	3:55

== Charts ==
=== Weekly charts ===
Chart (1996-1997)	Peak position
Hungarian Albums (MAHASZ)	38
US Billboard 200	20
US Top R&B/Hip-Hop Albums (Billboard)	4

=== Year-end charts ===
Chart (1996)	Position
US Top R&B/Hip-Hop Albums (Billboard)	69

== Certifications ==
Region	Certification	Certified units/sales
United States (RIAA)	Gold	500,000^{^}
^{^} Shipments figures based on certification alone.
