= Braxton Family Christmas =

Studio album by the Braxtons
- Released: October 30, 2015
- Recorded: 2015
- Genre: Christmas; pop; R&B; soul; gospel
- Length: 25:38
- Label: Def Jam
- Producer: Christopher Stewart; Kenneth "Babyface" Edmonds; Pierre Medor; Antonio Dixon; The Rascals; Toni Braxton; Michael Braxton; Demonte Posey

The Braxtons chronology
So Many Ways (1996)	Braxton Family Christmas (2015)

Toni Braxton chronology
Love, Marriage & Divorce (2014)	Braxton Family Christmas (2015)	Sex & Cigarettes (2018)

Singles from Braxton Family Christmas
- 1. "Every Day is Christmas" Released: November 5, 2015

Braxton Family Christmas is a Christmas album, and second studio album overall, by R&B female group the Braxtons. It is the only album to feature all five Braxton sisters. The album was released on October 30, 2015, by Def Jam.

== Background and composition ==
Braxton Family Christmas consists of eight tracks, including three covers of Christmas standards and carols ("This Christmas", "O' Holy Night", and "Mary, Did You Know?"), three original songs ("Every Day is Christmas", "Blessed New Year", and "Under My Christmas Tree") and a cover of Wham!'s "Last Christmas".

The family's reality show, Braxton Family Values, featured footage of the sisters throughout the recording process.

== Critical reaction ==
The Black Media reviewed the album in an article, "The Braxton Family finally got it done. For four years fans have been waiting for the sisters to put a project out, together! We've seen Tamar Braxton's solo success, chart-topping hits, and grammy nods. Trina's successful single releases, and Bar Chix grand opening, Towanda's acting career, and assistant training services. Traci's radio career, and successful solo career and amazing album release, and of course Toni Braxton's return to music going platinum with Baby Face and winning a Grammy after almost quitting. Fans wanted one thing, a joint album...and we've got it".

Soul Tracks reviewed the album in an article, "With unpredictable sales of full-length albums over the past decade, artist holiday collections have grown more scarce. That's why the release of a seasonal set by an act as storied and soulful as The Braxtons is a most welcome gift. Although only eight songs in length, Braxton Family Christmas is a delightful listen marked by an even mixture of standards and originals. It might not go down in history as memorably as sister Toni's own Snowflakes from 2001 (or Tamar's Winter Loversland from 2013), but hearing the five siblings together on several tracks for the first time in decades makes for some noteworthy musical moments. Toni serves as executive producer of Braxton Family Christmas, and she is, in fact, the focal point of roughly half the set (being the sole vocalist on the opening rendition of Donny Hathaway's "This Christmas" and the newly composed ballad, "Blessed New Year").

Tamar, Trina, Towanda, and Traci, however, brighten things harmonically—and with a few solo spots—on a finely tuned a cappella reading of "O' Holy Night" and a nostalgic remake of Wham!'s "Last Christmas." But perhaps the high point of the set is a full-hearted, majestic interpretation of "Mary, Did You Know?" Toni's rich, deep tones and delicate phrasing make a bold impact from the get-go, with a touching string arrangement by Lee Blaske providing a sentimental feeling that's in perfect complement. The sisters trade leads throughout the tune, climaxing with an impassioned vocal interplay that is powerful without going over the top. Close in effect, but on a more lighthearted note, the upbeat "Every Day Is Christmas" (co-written by Toni and Babyface) evokes a warm mood with mellow production by Antonio Dixon and smoothly honed harmonies enhancing the verses and engaging chorus.

It's the stuff that both soul and pop holiday classics are made of, with relatable lyrics and a sing-along melody to bring the message home: "Every day's Christmas 'cause of you/winter and fall and springtime, too/Got me all wrapped up, yes you do...Wish the whole world could feel the way I do." Rounding out the Braxton Family Christmas festivities is a lush ballad, "Under My Christmas Tree," written by brother Michael (who duets with Toni atop a piano-driven backdrop graced by a soothing trumpet solo) and the 'Braxton Family Version' of "This Christmas." The latter makes for a feel-good closer with a lively rhythmic structure and colorful, slightly jazzy background vocal arrangements. Straightforward, merry, and also spiritual with consistently authoritative vocals, Braxton Family Christmas is an ideal addition to the collection of any lover of uplifting holiday music.

== Singles ==
On November 5, 2015 "Every Day is Christmas" was released as the first single. The audio-video for "Every Day is Christmas" was released on VEVO on November 9, 2015."

== Commercial performance ==
Braxton Family Christmas debuted at number 144 on the US Billboard 200 on January 9, 2016. The album charted at number 27 on the US Billboard R&B/Hip-Hop Albums, number 10 on the US R&B Chart, and number 12 on US Top Holiday Albums on November 21, 2015. The album charted at number 4 on the US Heatseekers Albums on December 12, 2015, and has since peaked at number 1. The seasonal effort has sold 21,000 to date.

== Promotion ==
The Braxtons performed "Mary, Did You Know?" and "Under My Christmas Tree" with their brother Michael Braxton Jr on the daytime talk show The Real (which the youngest Braxton sibling Tamar co-hosted) on December 18, 2015.

== Track listing ==
No.	Title	Writer(s)	Length
1.	"This Christmas"	Donny Hathaway; Nadine McKinnor	3:19
2.	"Every Day is Christmas"	Toni Braxton; Kenneth "Babyface" Edmonds; Antonio Dixon; Leon Thomas III; Khristopher Riddick-Tynes	3:06
3.	"Mary, Did You Know?"	Mark Lowry; Buddy Greene	3:52
4.	"O' Holy Night" (A cappella)	Adolphe Adam	2:56
5.	"Last Christmas"	George Michael	4:21
6.	"Blessed New Year"	Toni Braxton; Antonio Dixon; Harold Lilly	2:04
7.	"Under My Christmas Tree" (with Michael Braxton)	Michael Braxton	2:29
8.	"This Christmas" (Braxton Family Version)	Donny Hathaway; Nadine McKinnor	3:27

== Credits and personnel ==
Performers and musicians

- Toni Braxton - Vocals, Background
- Traci Braxton - Vocals, Background
- Towanda Braxton - Vocals, Background
- Trina Braxton - Vocals, Background
- Tamar Braxton - Vocals, Background
- Michael Braxton Jr. - Vocals, Background (track 7)

Technical personnel

- Toni Braxton - Composer, Producer
- Antonio Dixon - Composer, Producer
- Kenneth "Babyface" Edmonds - Composer, Producer
- Khristopher Riddick-Tynes - Composer, Producer
- Michael Braxton - Composer
- Adolphe-Charles Adam - Composer
- Buddy Greene - Composer
- Donny Hathaway - Composer
- Harold Lilly - Composer
- Mark Lowry - Composer
- Nadine McKinnor - Composer
- George Michael - Composer
- Leon Thomas III - Composer

== Charts ==
Chart (2015)	Peak position
US Billboard 200	144
US Billboard R&B/Hip-Hop Albums	19
US Heatseekers Albums	1
US R&B Albums	10
US Top Holiday Albums	12

== Release history ==
Region	Date	Format	Label	Ref
United States	October 30, 2015	Digital download	Def Jam	
United Kingdom	October 30, 2015	Digital download	Def Jam	
Germany	October 30, 2015	Digital download	Def Jam	
Australia	October 30, 2015	Digital download	Def Jam	
United States	October 30, 2015	CD	Def Jam	
United Kingdom	November 13, 2015	CD	Def Jam	
Spain	November 13, 2015	CD	Def Jam	
