= The Braxtons =

American contemporary R&B group

- Origin: Severn, Maryland, U.S.
- Genres: R&B; soul; pop; urban contemporary gospel
- Years active: 1989–1998; 2010–present
- Labels: Arista; LaFace; Atlantic; Def Jam
- Members: Toni Braxton; Towanda Braxton; Trina Braxton; Tamar Braxton
- Past members: Traci Braxton

The Braxtons are an American musical quintet consisting of singer Toni Braxton and her younger sisters, Traci Braxton, Towanda Braxton, Trina Braxton, and Tamar Braxton. Despite failing to experience long-term success, the group's 1990 debut single, "Good Life", led to oldest sister Toni's solo career. All five members reunited in 2011 to star in the We TV reality television series Braxton Family Values alongside their mother, Evelyn Braxton.

In October 2015, the group released the album Braxton Family Christmas.

== History ==
The Braxtons' parents are Rev. Michael Braxton Sr. (born June 26, 1947) and Evelyn Braxton (born January 14, 1948). Their first child, Toni Michele Braxton was born on October 7, 1967. Michael Conrad Braxton Jr., the only son, was born on November 17, 1968, then Traci Renee Braxton was born on April 2, 1971. Traci died on March 12, 2022. Towanda Chloe Braxton was born on September 18, 1973. The Braxtons' fifth child Trina Evette Braxton, was born on December 3, 1974. The youngest sibling, Tamar Estine Braxton, was born on March 17, 1977. They are originally from Severn, Maryland.

The sisters began to harmonize together when a then five-year-old Tamar demanded, "somebody get me some toilet paper!" Each sister and brother Michael soon after went in the bathroom and began singing the "Toilet Paper Song". The Braxtons credit this incident as their first song-writing experience and the first time that they harmonized as a group. Growing up, they sang in the choir at several churches and toured the East Coast with their religious parents singing at various events.

=== 1989–1991: Good Life and lineup change ===
Toni, Traci, Towanda, Trina, and Tamar Braxton signed their first record deal with Arista Records in 1989. In 1990, they released their first single, "Good Life". It would be their only single as a quintet. "Good Life" was not a hit, peaking at No. 79 on the Billboard Hot R&B/Hip-Hop Singles chart. At the time of the single's release, the members' age differences created a problem with marketing. Subsequently, the Braxtons were dropped from Arista Records.

In 1991, during a showcase with Antonio "L.A." Reid and Kenneth "Babyface" Edmonds, who were in the process of forming LaFace Records, Toni Braxton, minus her four sisters, was chosen and signed as the label's first female solo artist. At the time, the remaining members were told that LaFace was not looking for another girl group since it had just signed TLC.

=== 1992–1995: Record deal and Traci's pregnancy ===
After Toni's departure from the group in 1991, the remaining Braxtons members became backup singers for Toni's first U.S. tour, music videos, and promotional appearances. Traci, Towanda, Trina, and Tamar were featured in the music video for Toni Braxton's third single, "Seven Whole Days", from her debut album.

In 1993, LaFace Records A&R Vice President, Bryant Reid, signed the Braxtons to LaFace. However, the group never released an album or single for the record label. When Reid moved on to work for Atlantic Records, he convinced executives at LaFace to allow him take the group to Atlantic also. They signed with Atlantic the following year, with a three-album deal.

It was reported in Vibe magazine that in 1995, Traci Braxton had left the group to pursue a career as a youth counselor. However, it was not confirmed until 2004 when Towanda Braxton appeared in season 2 of the reality show Starting Over, that Traci was not allowed to sign with Atlantic because of her pregnancy at the time.

=== 1996–1997: So Many Ways ===
In June 1996, Tamar, Trina, and Towanda returned with a new album entitled So Many Ways, which shared the same title as its lead single. Released on August 13, 1996, the album peaked at No. 26 on the Billboard R&B/Hip-Hop Albums charts. It became their first and only LP. Atlantic Records A&R VP, Bryant Reid, served as the album's executive producer. At the time of its release, Reid told Billboard Magazine, "I had a vision for them then that was about young sophistication with sex appeal." So Many Ways included production from Jermaine Dupri and Daryl Simmons along with Christopher "Tricky" Stewart and Sean "Sep" Hall. The album also included a cover of Diana Ross's hit "The Boss" and Klymaxx's song "I'd Still Say Yes".

The Braxtons released a music video in order to promote "So Many Ways". It was directed by Cameron Casey and featured upcoming actor Mekhi Phifer. The trio also performed a remixed version of "So Many Ways" with rapper Jay-Z on September 9, 1996, at the Soul Train Lady of Soul Awards. The single was also used as the opening track for the soundtrack to the comedy film High School High. "So Many Ways" went on to peak at No. 83 on the Billboard Hot 100 chart in 1996, No. 22 on the Billboard R&B Charts and number 32 on the UK Singles Chart in January 1997.

The album's second single, "Only Love", was released on January 25, 1997, and peaked at number 52 on the Billboard R&B/Hip-Hop Songs Chart. A music video for this song was also released. A Masters at Work remix version of the Braxtons third single "The Boss" reached number 1 on Billboard Dance/Club Play Chart in early 1997. "Slow Flow" was the final single released from So Many Ways. It peaked at No. 26 on the UK Charts in July 1997, becoming their highest-charting single in the UK.

The Braxtons also served as the opening act for Toni Braxton on the European Leg of her Secrets Tour in 1997. Traci also the joined the group for tour.

=== 1998–1999: Disbandment ===
The Braxtons decided to part ways as a group after lead singer Tamar Braxton left to pursue a solo career with DreamWorks Records in 1999. However, the members continued to sing and act in various other projects. There was a lot of drama surrounding the situation, which is part of the reason why Towanda went on Starting Over. She had caught wind of Tamar's signing of a contract through industry insiders rather than Tamar herself. This notably caused tension between the group, due to them planning on doing a second album, with the inclusion of Traci, that time around. Tamar revealed in Toni’s Behind The Music Episode that one of reasons the group split was because Trina became pregnant with her second child and Towanda moved back their home state Maryland.

=== 2000–2010: Solo projects ===
Trina appeared in the 2004 Tyler Perry play Meet the Browns as Tracy Stevens. She was also part of the play Rise, written by Salt from Salt-n-Pepa and Christopher "Play" Martin from the rap group Kid 'n Play and starred in an off-Broadway production of Dreamgirls as Deena Jones. In 2004, Trina Braxton appeared in "The Walk" with Eva Pigford and Vanessa Bell. Additionally, she co-starred in two independent films, including Jail Party, and was host for the unbroadcast Urban Idol for UPN. She also made a cameo in Tyler Perry's I Can Do Bad All By Myself as a member of a band performing with singer Mary J. Blige's character. In 2009, Trina joined the wedding band "Simply Irresistible" as a lead vocalist. In 2012, Trina left the band to pursue a solo music career, releasing her debut solo single "Party or Go Home" in March 2012.

Trina and Tamar performed as background singers and dancers for the entire duration of Toni's Libra Tour in 2006. They also performed in Toni Braxton: Revealed at the Flamingo Hotel and Casino until R&B singer Sparkle and Towanda Braxton replaced them.

Towanda Braxton appeared in season 2 of the reality show Starting Over. She performed and recorded a solo song, "Here I Am", for the show and conducted a radio interview on the Wendy Williams Experience about her time on Starting Over. Towanda is also a member of Zeta Phi Beta sorority and pledged at Bowie State University in 1995. In September 2005, People magazine's website reported that Towanda was pregnant.. She would later have a featured role as Khalil Kain's mistress in the 2017 movie Misguided Behavior.

Tamar Braxton released her debut solo album Tamar in 2000. She also made a cameo in the music video for "He Wasn't Man Enough". She appeared for a short time as Sasha in the stage play version of Madea Goes to Jail in 2005 alongside Tyler Perry and Cassi Davis. Tamar co-wrote several songs and sang background vocals for several of Toni's albums including Snowflakes, More Than a Woman, Libra, and Pulse. In 2012, Tamar released the single "Love and War", followed by two albums in 2013: a studio album entitled Love and War, followed by a Christmas album entitled Winter Loversland.

In 2010, the Braxtons, including Traci Braxton, appeared in sister Toni Braxton's music video for her dance single "Make My Heart".

=== 2011–2014: Braxton Family Values ===
In January 2011, WE tv confirmed that it had signed Toni Braxton and her sisters, Traci, Towanda, Trina, and Tamar for a reality series, entitled Braxton Family Values, to be marketed as one of the network's flagship shows. The show looks at the relationship between Toni, her mom, and her sisters along with the interpersonal relationships of each family member. After only four episodes, the series had renewed for a second season. There would be 13 more one-hour episodes of Braxton Family Values on WE tv in 2012, up from 10 during the debut season – which was later upped to a 26 episode second season, including the Reunion Show.

As of the second-season finale of Braxton Family Values, it is still unclear whether or not the EP that the Braxtons were working on will be released. During the show's reunion, Toni Braxton stated that she thought the Braxtons should "feature on [her] record" instead of her completely rejoining the group for a full EP.

The Braxtons posed for the June 2011 VIBE magazine summer swimwear issue. They also presented the "Best Gospel Artist" award to Mary Mary at the 2011 BET Awards. In mid-2011, Traci, Tamar, Towanda and Trina performed their song "The Boss" at WEtv Women's Luncheon in New York City. The performance was documented on Season 2 Episode 8 of Braxton Family Values.

In July 2014, a sneak peek of the fourth season of "Braxton Family Values" was uploaded via YouTube on WE tv's user account of the Braxton sisters discussing doing a gospel record together. In the same time, Toni, Tamar and Trina guest starred on their sister Traci's music video "Last Call".

=== 2015–present: Braxton Family Christmas ===
In October 2015, the group including Toni, Tamar, Traci, Trina and Towanda, released an album titled Braxton Family Christmas as five members. The album was released on October 30 and pre-order on October 16. Braxton Family Christmas debuted at number 27 on the US Billboard R&B/Hip-Hop Albums, number 10 on the US R&B Chart and number 12 on US Top Holiday Albums on November 21, 2015. The album charted at number 1 on the US Heatseekers Albums on December 12, 2015.

== Members ==
Member	1989	1990	1991	1992	1993	1994	1995	1996	1997	1998	2010	2011	2012	2015	2016
Tamar Braxton (Soprano) (1989–1998, 2010–2012, 2015–present)															
Trina Braxton (Mezzo-soprano) (1989–1998, 2010–2012, 2015–present)															
Towanda Braxton (Mezzo-soprano) (1989–1998, 2010–2012, 2015–present)															
Traci Braxton (Soprano) (1989–1995, 2010–2012, 2015–2022)															
Toni Braxton (contralto) (1989–1991, 2015–present)															

== Discography ==
=== Studio albums ===
Title	Album details	Peak chart positions						Certifications	Sales
Title	Album details	US	US R&B	US Heat	NL	NZ	UK	Certifications	Sales
So Many Ways	Released: August 13, 1996; Label: Atlantic; Formats: CD, Cassette	113	26	2	48	17	— (Note: "So Many Ways" did not enter the UK Albums Chart but peaked at number 33 on the UK R&B/Hip Hop Albums Chart.)	—	
Braxton Family Christmas	Released: October 30, 2015; Label: Def Jam; Formats: CD, digital download	144	19	1	—	—	—	—	US: 21,000 (Note: sales as of January 2016)
"—" denotes a title that did not chart, or was not released in that territory.

=== Singles ===
Title	Year	Peak chart positions								Certifications	Album
Title	Year	US	US R&B	US Dance	NL	NZ	UK	UK R&B	UK Dance	Certifications	Album
"Good Life"	1990	—	79	—	—	—	—	—	—		Non-album single
"So Many Ways"	1996	83	22	—	—	17	32	7	—		So Many Ways
"Only Love"	1997	119	52	—	—	3	—	—	—		So Many Ways
"The Boss"	1997	—	106	1	24	10	31	—	6		So Many Ways
"Slow Flow"	1997	—	104	—	49	38	26	7	—		So Many Ways
"Every Day Is Christmas"	2015	—	—	—	—	—	—	—	—		Braxton Family Christmas
"—" denotes a title that did not chart, or was not released in that territory.

== See also ==
- List of Number 1 Dance Hits (United States)
- List of artists who reached number one on the US Dance chart
