= So Many Ways =

Studio album by The Braxtons
- Released: August 6, 1996 (original version); November 19, 1996 (later pressings)
- Recorded: November 1995 – April 1996
- Length: 59:20
- Label: Atlantic
- Producers: Jermaine Dupri; Tricky Stewart; Sean "Sep" Hall; Daryl Simmons; Allen "Allstar" Gordon; Donald Parks; Emmanuel Officer; John Howcott; Kenny Gonzalez; Little Louie Vega

The Braxtons chronology
So Many Ways (1996)	Braxton Family Christmas (2015)

Singles from So Many Ways
- 1. "So Many Ways" Released: July 23, 1996; 2. "Only Love" Released: January 25, 1997; 3. "The Boss" Released: March 17, 1997; 4. "Slow Flow" Released: July 2, 1997

So Many Ways is the debut album by American R&B vocal group The Braxtons. It was released by Atlantic Records on August 6, 1996 in the United States.

Critics praised the album's smooth pop vocals, soulful harmonies, and sultry ballads, calling it a "strong debut" despite some criticism, particularly of "The Boss." So Many Ways peaked at number 26 on the US Top R&B/Hip-Hop Albums chart, also reaching number two on the Heatseekers chart, and produced four singles; "So Many Ways", "Only Love", "The Boss" – which peaked at number-one in the Billboard Dance Charts – and "Slow Flow".

== Background ==
The Braxtons originally started out in 1989. They first signed as a fivesome to Arista Records which consisted of Toni Braxton and her four sisters, Tamar, Trina, Towanda and Traci. In 1990, they released their first single "Good Life". It would be their only single as a fivesome. "Good Life" failed to become a hit and The Braxtons were dropped from Arista Records. Despite the single's underwhelming performance, Toni Braxton's vocals caught the attention of Antonio "L.A." Reid and Kenneth "Babyface" Edmonds who were in the process of forming LaFace Records. Eventually, Toni signed as a solo artist and started her career in 1992. In 1996, three out of the four Braxtons, Trina, Tamar and Towanda reunited and released their album So Many Ways. Their older sister Traci, did not join them as she was pregnant at the time they signed a new contract. The album produced four singles: "So Many Ways", "Only Love", "Slow Flow" and "The Boss"; the latter peaked at number-one in the Billboard Dance Charts.

== Singles ==
"So Many Ways" was released as the lead single from the album July 23, 1996. On August 17, 1996, The Braxtons released the video for the song, it was directed by Cameron Casey and featured actor Mekhi Phifer. The single was also used as the opening track for the soundtrack to the comedy film High School High.

The song charted at 83 on Billboard Hot 100 and 22 on US R&B/Hip-Hop Songs in the US. The song reached the top 40 in the UK charting at 32 and in New Zealand the song charted at 17. The trio also performed a remixed version of "So Many Ways" with rapper Jay-Z on September 9, 1996, at the Soul Train Lady of Soul Awards.

"Only Love" was released as the album's second single on January 25, 1997. The song charted at #52 on Billboard's Hot R&B/Hip-Hop Songs spending fourteen weeks in total on the chart. The song charted at #3 on New Zealand's Top 40 chart. A music video for this song was also released.

"The Boss" was released as the album's third single in early 1997. A music video was released to promote the song. On February 1, 1997, the Masters At Work version topped the Billboard Hot Dance Club Play chart for one week a #1 in the United States. The song stayed in the chart for 14 weeks. On March 29, 1997, the song debuted at number 31 on the UK Singles Chart. The song spent a total of three weeks on the chart at numbers 50 and 69 respectively before leaving the Top 75 on April 12, 1997, becoming their second top 40 in the UK.

"Slow Flow" was released as the fourth and final single from the album. Despite failing to chart in the U.S. the song charted at #26 on UK Singles Chart becoming their highest chart to date. The song also charted in New Zealand at #38 on New Zealand Singles Chart. The Braxtons also served as the opening act for Toni Braxton on the European Leg of her Secrets Tour in 1997.

== Critical reception ==
Professional ratings
Review scores
Source	Rating
AllMusic	4/5 stars
USA Today	2.5/4 stars

USA Today critic Steve Jones gave So Many Ways two and a half stars out of five, noting that while the group showed a "family resemblance" to their sister, they "didn't try to mimic the signature sad love songs" of Toni Braxton. He said "nothing here matched Toni's emotional renderings," but praised their "smooth pop vocals and soulful harmonies," making tracks like the title cut "eminently likable." AllMusic editor Leo Stanley called the album a "strong debut" and found that it "was quite similar to the sound of their sister. He added that "what was a surprise" was "how effective the music was," crediting producers who "downplay the group's weaknesses and accentuate their virtues," calling it "expertly crafted urban soul." Cash Box wrote that the group "show[ed] their musical mettle" on "sultry ballads" with "vocal prowess," praising highlights like "Slow Flow" and "L.A.D.I." and calling the album an "otherwise tranquil, luxuriant disc." The magazine criticized "The Boss" as "incongruous," but said the LP would earn them "increased respect for their solo skills."

== Commercial performance ==
So Many Ways peaked at number 26 on the US Top R&B/Hip-Hop Albums chart. It reached number two on Billboard's Heatseekers Albums chart.

== Track listing ==
So Many Ways track listing
No.	Title	Writer(s)	Producer(s)	Length
1.	"So Many Ways"	Carl-So-Lowe; Jermaine Dupri	Jermaine Dupri	3:54
2.	"Slow Flow"	Sean "Sep" Hall; London Jones; Christopher "Tricky" Stewart	Christopher "Tricky" Stewart; Sean "Sep" Hall	4:24
3.	"Only Love"	Anthony Burroughs; Andrea Martin; Ivan Matias	Allen "Allstar" Gordon	4:25
4.	"I'd Still Say Yes"	Babyface; Joyce "Fenderella" Irby	Daryl Simmons	4:42
5.	"L.A.D.I."	Traci Braxton; The Braxtons; Simbi Khali; Stewart	Stewart; Hall	4:10
6.	"Take Home to Momma"	Dupri; Manuel Seal, Jr.	Dupri	4:29
7.	"Where's the Good in Goodbye"	Stewart	Stewart; Hall	5:23
8.	"What Does It Take"	Joel Campbell; Andrea Martin	Gordon	5:26
9.	"Girl on the Side"	Traci Braxton; Braxtons; London Jones; Stewart	Stewart; Hall	4:42
10.	"In a Special Way"	Tabitha Duncan; John Howcott; Emanuel Officer; Donald Parks	Donald Parks; Emanuel Officer; John Howcott	4:55
11.	"Never Say Goodbye"	Howcott; Silena Murrell; Officer; Parks	Parks; Officer; Howcott	3:09
12.	"The Boss"	Nick Ashford; Valerie Simpson	Kenny "Dope" Gonzalez, "Little" Louie Vega	9:41
Total length:				59:20

Japan bonus Track
No.	Title	Writer(s)	Producer(s)	Length
13.	"24/7"	Officer; Rory Bennett; Robbie Nevil	Parks; Officer; Howcott	4:29

== Charts ==
Chart (1996)	Peak position
Canada Top Albums/CDs (RPM)	55
Dutch Albums (Album Top 100)	48
UK R&B Albums (Official Charts)	33
US Billboard 200	113
US Billboard R&B/Hip-Hop Albums	26
US Heatseekers Albums	2

== Release history ==
Region	Date	Format	Edition	Label	Ref
United Kingdom	August 6, 1996	CD	Standard	Atlantic Records	
Germany	August 9, 1996	CD	Standard	Atlantic Records	
United Kingdom	August 12, 1996	Cassette	Standard	Atlantic Records	
United States	August 13, 1996	CD, Cassette	Standard	Atlantic Records	
United Kingdom	September 9, 1996	CD	Re-release	Atlantic Records	
Japan	September 25, 1996	CD	Japan Edition	Atlantic Records; East West Japan Inc.	
