= So Many Ways (The Braxtons song) =

Single by The Braxtons

from the album High School High soundtrack and So Many Ways
- Released: July 23, 1996
- Recorded: November 1995
- Genre: R&B; hip hop; pop
- Length: 3:54; 5:37 (remix)
- Label: Atlantic
- Songwriters: Carl-So-Lowe; Jermaine Dupri
- Producer: Jermaine Dupri

The Braxtons singles chronology
"Family" (1990)	"So Many Ways" (1996)	"Only Love" (1997)

"So Many Ways" is a song by American R&B vocal group The Braxtons, released on July 23, 1996, by Atlantic Records, as the lead single from their debut album, So Many Ways (1996). The song was written by Carl-So-Lowe, Jermaine Dupri and produced by Dupri. A version featuring Jay-Z was featured on the High School High soundtrack (1996). The song peaked at number 83 on the US Billboard Hot 100 and number 22 on the Billboard R&B/Hip-Hop Songs. It also reached the top 20 in New Zealand, and the top 40 in the UK.

== Critical reception ==
Larry Flick from Billboard magazine named the song an "instantly memorable chugger". He added, "Fortunately, the Braxtons' smokey contralto tones are cast within a markedly more raw and streetwise musical setting than are the more sophisticated and mature Toni's recordings." Peter Miro from Cash Box wrote, "What could be better than one entrancing Braxton, but three of them? There's a certain, original aura rising from this soulful, siren-esque chorus Toni's seasoned siblings generate on the title track to their forthcoming LP. Sounding full enough to be four women, The Braxtons seem capable of winning hearts and filling the void left by En Vogue and Jade. Deft-handed producer Dupri makes his foreground subject stand out with an infectious rhythm track and background touches ideal for girl-group profiling. Urban radio can heartily pipe this song aboard on July 2."

== Commercial performance ==
On August 10, 1996, "So Many Ways" charted at #52 on the R&B/Hip-Hop Airplay chart. On August 17, 1996, the song peaked at #31 on the R&B/Hip-Hop Airplay chart, sustaining 11 weeks on the chart. Also that week, the song peaked at #22 on US R&B/Hip-Hop Songs and remained on the chart for 19 weeks. On October 5, 1996, "So Many Ways" debuted at #83 on the Billboard Hot 100, marking the group's first and only time entry. The song spent 8 weeks in the chart before its departure in December 1996.

On October 20, 1996, the song debuted at #34 on the New Zealand Singles Chart. In its second week, the song moved up 13 places to #21. In its third week, the song dropped 10 places to #31. In its fourth week, the song moved up 6 places to #25. In its fifth week, the song moved up 7 places to #18. In its sixth week, the song moved up 1 place to its peak, at #17. The song charted at #27, #31 and #39 in its seventh, eighth and ninth week. The song moved up 5 places to #34 and remained for four weeks before falling to #48 on January 19, 1997, and later leaving the Top 50, spending a total of 14 weeks on the chart.

On February 1, 1997, the song debuted at #32 on the UK Singles Chart. The song spent a total of two weeks on the chart, falling to #58 after its chart debut, before leaving the Top 75 on February 8, 1997. It became their first top 40 in the UK.

== Live performances ==
The song was performed at the 1996 Soul Train Lady of Soul Awards with rapper Jay-Z on September 9. Further televised performances were made through the fall, on Showtime at the Apollo (October 19), CBS This Morning, Teen Summit, and Soul Train (November 16).

== Music video ==
The accompanying music video was directed by Cameron Casey, which features Trina and Tamar wearing a white two-piece and Towanda wearing a white dress. The video starts with The Braxtons dancing on a stage and performing in a white room featuring a male lead. Mekhi Phifer additionally makes a cameo appearance. Later on, the sisters are seen wearing dresses in a car together.

== Track listings and formats ==
- US vinyl single
1. "So Many Ways" (Extended Mix) – 5:17
2. "So Many Ways" (Extended Instrumental Mix) – 5:18
3. "So Many Ways" (A Cappella) – 3:51
4. "So Many Ways" (T.V. Track) – 3:55
- US CD promo single
1. "So Many Ways" (Trina's Mix) – 4:34
2. "So Many Ways" (The Braxtons Mix) – 4:40
3. "So Many Ways" (Towanda's Mix) – 4:04
4. "So Many Ways" (Tamar's Mix) – 4:25
5. "So Many Ways" (Album Version) – 3:54
- UK vinyl promo single
1. A1 "So Many Ways" (Trina's Mix) (LP Version) – 5:20
2. A2 "So Many Ways" (The Braxtons Mix) – 5:37
3. A3 "So Many Ways" (Tamar's Mix) – 4:58
4. B1 "The Boss" (Masters At Work Album Mix) – 9:41
5. B1 "The Boss" (Kenlou Radio Mix) – 4:13
- UK, Europe CD maxi-single
1. "So Many Ways" (Album Version) – 3:55
2. "So Many Ways" (Trina's Mix Extended) – 5:20
3. "So Many Ways" (Feat. Jay-Z Extended) – 5:37
4. "So Many Ways" (Tamar's Mix Extended) – 4:57
5. "So Many Ways" (Instrumental) – 5:17
6. "So Many Ways" (L.P. Version) – 5:14
- US cassette single
1. A1"So Many Ways" (Album Version) – 3:55
2. A2"So Many Ways" (Instrumental) – 5:17
3. B1"So Many Ways" (Album Version) – 3:55
4. B2"So Many Ways" (Instrumental) – 5:17
- Europe vinyl single
1. A1"So Many Ways" (Album Version) – 3:55
2. A2"So Many Ways" (Instrumental) – 5:17
3. B1"So Many Ways" (Trina's Mix Extended) – 5:20
4. B2"So Many Ways" (Feat. Jay-Z Extended) – 5:37
5. B3"So Many Ways" (Tamar's Mix Extended) – 4:57

== Charts ==
Chart (1996–1997)	Peak position
New Zealand (Recorded Music NZ)	17
Scotland Singles (OCC)	90
UK Singles (OCC)	32
UK Dance (OCC)	13
UK Hip Hop/R&B (OCC)	7
US Billboard Hot 100	83
US R&B/Hip-Hop Songs (Billboard)	22
US R&B/Hip-Hop Airplay (Billboard)	31
