= Braxton Family Values =

American reality TV series about the Braxton family

- Genre: Reality television
- Starring: Toni Braxton; Traci Braxton; Towanda Braxton; Trina Braxton; Tamar Braxton; Evelyn Braxton
- Country of origin: United States
- No. of seasons: 7
- No. of episodes: 148 (list of episodes)

Production
- Executive producers: Toni Braxton; Tamar Braxton; Trina Braxton; Towanda Braxton; Dan Cutforth; Jane Lipsitz; Julio Kollerbohm; Michelle Kongkasuwan; Lauren Gellert; Annabelle McDonald; Sitarah Pendelton
- Running time: 40–43 minutes
- Production company: Magical Elves Productions

Original release
- Network: WE tv
- Release: April 12, 2011 – December 17, 2020

Related
- Tamar & Vince; Tamar Braxton: Get Ya Life!; The Braxtons

Braxton Family Values (abbreviated BFV) is an American reality television series that airs on WE tv and premiered on April 12, 2011. It chronicled the lives of the Braxton sisters—Toni, Traci, Towanda, Trina and Tamar and their mother, Evelyn.

Braxton Family Values had received favorable reviews from critics and has been recognized as a "guilty pleasure" by several media outlets. The fourth season was the most watched season with 1.5 million total viewers, up 8% compared to the previous seasons.

The show's spin-off series, Tamar & Vince, aired on WE tv from 2012 to 2017.

== Production ==
In January 2011, WE tv confirmed that it had signed Toni Braxton for a reality series, entitled Braxton Family Values, which was being marketed as one of the network's flagship shows. In its first four airings, Braxton Family Values averaged a 0.63 household rating, attracting 350,000 women in the 18–49 demographic, three times WE tv's average in the Tuesday 9 pm slot. This led the network to renew the series for a 13 episode second season. In July 2011, WE tv ordered additional episodes for season two—bringing the season total to 26 episodes.

In July 2012, WE tv renewed the show for a third season that debuted on March 14, 2013. The third season returned on November 14, 2013. The second half of season three resumes where the series left off prior to its hiatus, with Traci discovering that her husband may have cheated on her. Trina facing her own marital troubles and makes the decision to file for a divorce from her husband. Towanda is in celebration mode as she approaches a milestone birthday. Toni is in the midst of a career rebirth as she finishes up her new album "Love Marriage & Divorce" with Kenneth "Babyface" Edmonds and prepares for her first tour in over five years. Tamar has launched her album Love and War, her tour, and taking care of her newborn son. Season 3 averaged 1.4 million viewers.

On March 20, 2014, WE tv announced the fourth season renewal of Braxton Family Values. Season 4 consisted of 26 episodes and premiered on August 14, 2014. On May 19, 2016, the fifth season aired to We tv. On May 12, 2017, Tamar Braxton announced in an interview with Billboard the series would return with a sixth season.

On June 27, 2018, it was reported that the show would go on an indefinite hiatus during the filming of the remainder of the sixth season after Toni, Towanda, Trina, Tamar, and Evelyn did not show up to film in Atlanta due to being underpaid. On July 19, 2018, WE tv announced that the remainder of the sixth season would begin airing on August 16, 2018.

The show was renewed for a seventh season, which premiered on November 5, 2020, on WE tv.

In October 2021, Tamar Braxton confirmed the series would be returning for an eighth season but on another, unannounced network.

In February 2024, WE tv confirmed that the Braxton family would star in a new show, The Braxtons.

== Cast ==
=== Main ===
Trina Braxton, Towanda Braxton, Toni Braxton, Tamar Braxton, Evelyn Braxton, and Traci Braxton (from left)

- Toni Michele Braxton (born October 7, 1967) is an American singer–songwriter, pianist, record producer, actress, television personality, and philanthropist. Rising to fame in the early 1990s, Braxton quickly established herself as an R&B icon and became one of the best-selling female artists of the 1990s decade, garnering her honorific titles such as the "Queen of R&B" and being recognized as one of the most outstanding voices of this generation. Throughout her career, Braxton has sold over 67 million records, including 64 million albums, worldwide. She has won seven Grammy Awards, nine Billboard Music Awards, seven American Music Awards and several other awards. Toni has two sons with her ex-husband, Keri Lewis, Denim Cole Braxton-Lewis born 2001 and Diezel Ky Braxton-Lewis born 2003.
- Traci Renee Braxton (born April 2, 1971 – March 12, 2022), was an American singer, reality television personality and Radio personality. In 2013, she got her own radio show called The Traci Braxton Show on the BLIS.F.M. radio. Her solo debut album, Crash & Burn, was released on October 7, 2014, preceded by the single "Last Call". "Last Call" peaked at number 16 on the US R&B Adult Chart, No. 11 on the Billboard R&B Albums chart and at No. 1 on the Heatseekers Albums chart. Traci has one son with her husband, Kevin Surratt, Kevin Surratt Jr. born in 1996.
- Towanda Chloe Braxton (born September 18, 1973) is an American singer, actress and reality television personality. Towanda had her first big break in music in 1992 as a founding member of the R&B group The Braxtons, formed with her sisters. After losing two members (Toni and Traci), The Braxtons released their only album, "So Many Ways", as a trio (Trina, Tamar and Towanda) in 1996. She has not released any music since as she is pursuing a career in acting. She has two children, Braxton Montelus Carter and Brooke Carter. She was previously married to Andre Carter.
- Trina Evette Braxton (born December 3, 1974) is an American singer, actress and reality television personality. Trina had her first big break in music in 1992 as a founding member of the R&B group The Braxtons, formed with her sisters. After losing two members (Toni and Traci), The Braxtons released their only album, So Many Ways, as a trio (Trina, Tamar, and Towanda) in 1996. Trina released her first solo single called Party or Go Home on March 22, 2012. Since that time, Braxton has starred in several movies and launched a line of hair and bar company.
- Tamar Estine Braxton (born March 17, 1977) is an American singer, television personality and actress. Braxton had her first big break in music in 1990 as a founding member of the American R&B singing group The Braxtons, formed with her sisters. The Braxtons released their debut album, So Many Ways, as a trio (Trina, Tamar, and Towanda) in 1996. In 2000, Braxton began her solo career, after signing with DreamWorks Records. She released her debut self-titled album that same year. The album was not commercially successful, leading to Braxton being dropped from the label's roster. Braxton returned to the music industry after a thirteen-year break, with her second album, Love and War (2013). The album was released through Epic Records and became a commercial success. Braxton is a former co-host of The Real talk show for the Fox Broadcasting Company, which she co-hosted from 2013 to 2016, Braxton's latest career venture is an exclusive television development deal signed with the Steve Harvey owned East 112th Street Productions, for her own talk show and television series.
- Evelyn "Ms. E." Braxton (born January 14, 1948) is an Opera singer, certified life coach, cook and devoted mother of six: Toni, Michael, Traci, Towanda, Trina and Tamar Braxton. Apart from the Braxton Family Values, Evelyn also shares her life experiences through her brand "Ms. E's Recipes." She offers the recipes of success through her very own delicious food recipes as well as the recipes for a successful and happy life.

=== Featured ===
- Vincent Herbert, Tamar's ex-husband and Logan's father
- Andre Carter, Towanda's ex-husband and father of Braxton and Brooke
- Gabe Solis, Trina's ex-husband and long time friend. Solis died on December 20, 2018, after a battle with cancer. He was 43.
- Keri Lewis, Toni's ex-husband and father of Denim and Diezel
- Kevin Surratt Sr., Traci's husband and father of Kevin Jr.
- Kevin Surratt Jr., Traci's son
- Kevin Surratt III or K3., Traci's grandson
- Michael Braxton Jr., father of Ashlee Braxton, Lauren Braxton, and son of Evelyn and Michael Sr. Lauren died on April 29, 2019, aged 24.
- Michael Braxton Sr., father of the Braxton children and Evelyn's ex-husband
- Ashlee Braxton, daughter of Michael Braxton Jr.
- Logan Herbert, son of Tamar Braxton
- Diezel Braxton-Lewis, son of Toni Braxton
- Denim Braxton-Lewis, son of Toni Braxton
- Braxton Carter, son of Towanda Braxton
- Brooke Carter, daughter of Towanda Braxton
- Sean Hall, Towanda's boyfriend
- Von Scales, Trina's husband
- David Adefeso, Tamar's ex-fiancé
- Eric Mojica, Trina's son
- Caleb Mojica, Trina's son

== Episodes ==
Season	Episodes	Originally released	
Season	Episodes	First released	Last released
1	10	April 12, 2011	June 14, 2011
2	26	November 10, 2011	September 21, 2012
3	26	March 14, 2013	February 20, 2014
4	28	August 14, 2014	September 3, 2015
5	26	May 19, 2016	May 25, 2017
6	26	March 22, 2018	June 6, 2019
7	6	November 5, 2020	December 17, 2020

== Home media ==
The first season was released to DVD on May 1, 2012, featuring all 10 episodes and reunion episode plus exclusive clips. The second season was released to DVD in two volumes both released on June 6, 2013. On March 25, 2014, volume 1 of the third season was released to DVD.

DVD name	Region 1	Ref.
The First Season	May 1, 2012	
The Second Season — Volume One	June 6, 2013	
The Second Season — Volume Two	June 6, 2013	
The Third Season — Volume One	March 25, 2014	
