= Traci Braxton =

American singer and media personality (1971–2022)

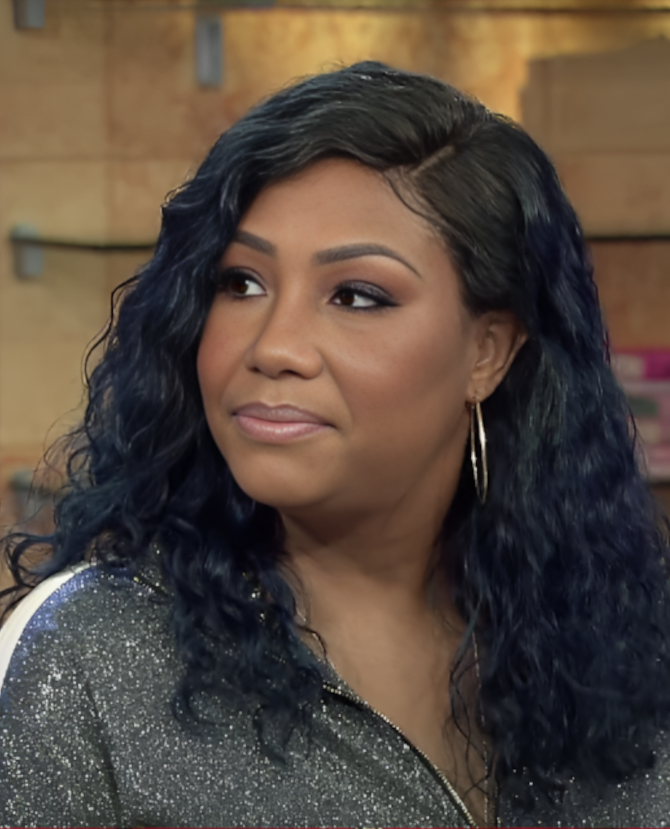
- Braxton in 2018.

Background information
- Born: Traci Renee Braxton; April 2, 1971; Severn, Maryland, US
- Died: March 12, 2022 (aged 50) New York City, US
- Genre: R&B
- Occupations: Singer; media personality
- Years active: 1989–2022
- Labels: MNRK; Soul World
- Formerly of: The Braxtons
- Spouse: Kevin Surratt (m. 1996)
- Website: tracibraxton.com

Traci Renee Braxton (April 2, 1971 – March 12, 2022) was an American singer, reality television personality, and radio personality.

== Early life ==
Traci Renee Braxton was born in Severn, Maryland the third child of her parents. Her father, Michael Conrad Braxton Sr., was a Methodist clergyman and power company worker, and her mother, Evelyn Jackson, a native of South Carolina, was a former opera singer and cosmetologist, as well as a pastor. Braxton's maternal grandfather was also a pastor.

Braxton has an older brother, Michael Jr. (born in 1968), and four sisters, Toni (born in 1967), Towanda (born in 1973), Trina (born in 1974) and Tamar (born in 1977). Braxton and her siblings were raised in a strict religious household, and Braxton's first performing experience was singing in her church choir.

== Career ==
=== 1989–1991: Career beginnings with The Braxtons ===
Toni, Traci, Towanda, Trina, and Tamar Braxton signed their first record deal with Arista Records in 1989. In 1990, they released their first single, "Good Life". It would be their only single as a fivesome. "Good Life" peaked at No. 79 on the Billboard Hot R&B/Hip-Hop Singles chart. At the time of the single's release, the members' age differences created a problem with marketing. Subsequently, The Braxtons were dropped from Arista Records.

In 1991, during a showcase with Antonio "L.A." Reid and Kenneth "Babyface" Edmonds—who were in the process of forming LaFace Records—Toni Braxton, minus her four sisters, was chosen and signed as the label's first female solo artist. At the time, the remaining members were told that LaFace was not looking for another girl group, since they had just signed TLC.

=== 1992–1995: Career complications and pregnancy ===
After Toni's departure from the group in 1991, the remaining Braxtons ultimately became backup singers for Toni's first U.S. tour, music videos, and promotional appearances. The sisters—Traci, Towanda, Trina, and Tamar—made several televised appearances as backing vocalists with Toni, and gave answers during interviews, such as on The Today Show. They were also featured in the music video for Toni Braxton's third single, "Seven Whole Days", from her debut album.

In 1993, LaFace Records A&R Vice President, Bryant Reid, signed The Braxtons to LaFace. However, the group never released an album or single for the record label. When Reid moved on to work for Atlantic Records in 1996, he convinced executives at LaFace to allow him take the group to Atlantic also. However, Traci was not included in the move to Atlantic. At the time, Vibe magazine reported she left the group to pursue a career as a youth counselor. However, Braxton and her sisters later revealed that Traci became pregnant, and the label gave her an ultimatum to terminate the pregnancy or leave the group.

=== 2011–2016: Reality television and return to music ===
In 2011, Braxton reunited with her sisters for the WE tv reality show, Braxton Family Values. She makes appearances as backing vocal singer of her sisters in some shows over the years. In 2013, Braxton and her husband Kevin Surratt joined the third season of Marriage Boot Camp.

In 2013, Braxton began her solo career after signing with independent media conglomerate Entertainment One under eOne Music and Soul World Entertainment to release an album. The same year, she got her own radio show called The Traci Braxton show on the BLIS.F.M. radio.

Her solo debut album, Crash & Burn, was released on October 7, 2014. The album's lead single "Last Call" peaked at number 16 on the US R&B Adult. "Crash & Burn" debuted at No. 108 on the Billboard Hot 200 with sales of 4,000 in its first week. The album also reached No. 11 on the relaunched Billboard R&B Albums chart and at No. 1 on the Heatseekers Albums chart. The second single, "Perfect Time," was released in 2015.

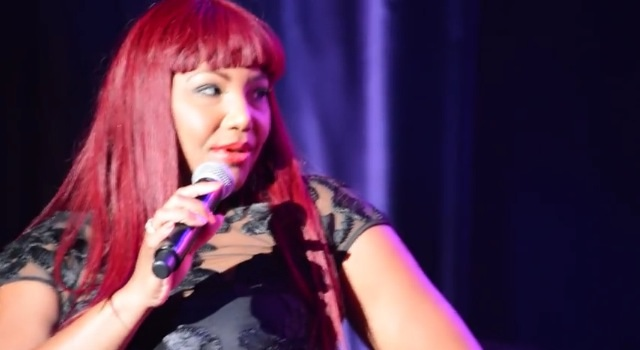
Braxton performing at Howard University in 2014

In January 2015, Braxton joined the judging panel of Mrs. DC America 2015. In October, The Braxtons released their second album, Braxton Family Christmas. The album debuted at number 27 on the US Billboard R&B/Hip-Hop Albums, number 10 on the US R&B chart, number 12 on the US Top Holiday Albums, and topped the US Heatseekers Albums. In May 2016, Braxton released the single "Body Shots."

=== 2017–2022: Acting and On Earth ===
In May 2017, Braxton made her acting debut in the play There's a Stranger in My House. She also continued releasing music, being featured on the rapper Kokayi’s track "Moonlight" in September, and the single "Broken Things" with sisters Toni, Towanda, and Trina in April 2018.

In August 2018, Braxton announced her second album On Earth would be released that same month. She also released its lead single "Lifeline" concurrent to the album announcement. As Braxton Family Values entered a hiatus due to disputes between the family and network, Braxton pivoted toward acting roles in independent films, making her debut in Sinners Wanted. Throughout 2019 and 2020, she appeared in minor roles in the film All In starring Lil Mama, and The Christmas Lottery. In September 2021, Braxton collaborated with Candiace Dillard Bassett on the song "Stay with Me" for Bassett's debut album Deep Space.

== Death ==
Braxton died on March 12, 2022, at the age of 50. She had been suffering from esophageal cancer for at least one year before her death.

== Discography ==
=== Albums ===
Title	Album details	Peak chart positions			
Title	Album details	US	US Heat	US R&B	US R&B/HH
Crash & Burn	Released: October 7, 2014; Label: Entertainment One; Format: CD, digital download	108	1	11	18
On Earth	Released: August 24, 2018; Label: Soul World Entertainment; Formats: CD, digital download	—	—	24	—

=== Singles ===
Year	Song	Peaks	Album
Year	Song	US Adult R&B	Album
2014	"Last Call"	16	Crash & Burn
2015	"Perfect Time"	—	Crash & Burn
2017	"Moonlight" (Kokayi featuring Traci Braxton)	—	—
2018	"Broken Things" (featuring Toni, Towanda and Trina)	—	On Earth
2018	"Lifeline"		On Earth
2025	"U Know Its Christmas"		

== Appearances ==
Film

- 2018: Sinners Wanted: Nana
- 2019: All In: Foster Mom
- 2020: The Christmas Lottery: Announcer

Television

- Braxton Family Values (as herself, 2011–2020)
- Marriage Boot Camp (as herself, 2014)

Radio

- The Traci Braxton Show

Theater

- There's a Stranger in My House (2017)
