= Trina Braxton =

American singer (born 1974)

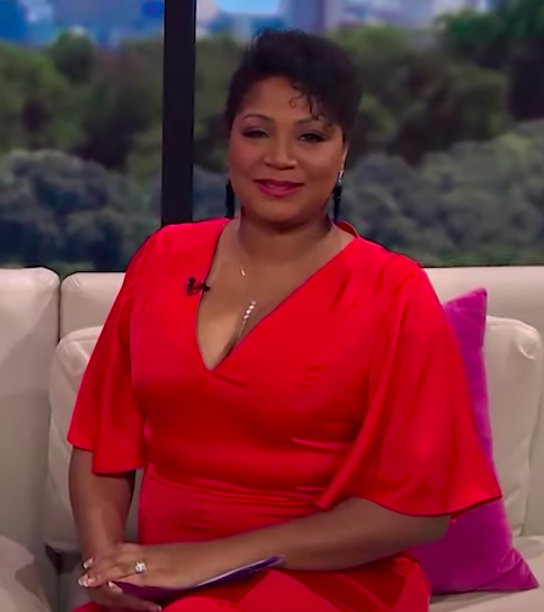
- Trina Braxton hosting Sister Circle in 2020

Background information
- Born: Trina Evette Braxton; December 3, 1974 (age 51); Severn, Maryland, U.S.
- Genres: R&B; soul; pop
- Occupations: Singer; actress; television personality
- Years active: 1989–present
- Label: Soltri Entertainment (2012–present)
- Spouses: Gabriel Solis (m. 2003; div. 2015) Von Scales (m. 2019; died 2026)
- Website: trinabraxton.com

Trina Evette Braxton-Scales (born December 3, 1974) is an American singer, actress, and reality television personality. Braxton is a founding member of the Braxtons, a group who rose to fame in the 1990s with Atlantic Records. She is also the younger sister of American singer Toni Braxton.

In 2011, Braxton starred in the We TV reality show, Braxton Family Values, along with her family members. The first season was the #1 rated reality show on WE tv, and the network ordered a 13-episode second season of the show after the third episode. Trina released her first solo single called "Party or Go Home" in March 2012. From 2018 to 2020, Braxton co-hosted the American talk show Sister Circle.

== Early life ==
Trina Evette Braxton was born in Severn, Maryland. Her father, Michael Conrad Braxton Sr., was a Methodist clergyman and power company worker, and her mother, Evelyn Jackson, a native of South Carolina, was a former opera singer and cosmetologist, as well as a pastor. Braxton's maternal grandfather was also a pastor. Braxton has an older brother named Michael, Jr. (born in 1968) and four sisters named Toni (born in 1967), Towanda (born in 1973), Traci (1971-2022), and Tamar (born in 1977). Braxton and her siblings were raised in a strict religious household, and Braxton's first performing experience was singing in her church choir.

== Career ==
=== 1990–1997: Career beginnings and The Braxtons ===
Toni, Traci, Towanda, Trina, and Tamar Braxton signed their first record deal with Arista Records in 1989. In 1990, they released their first single, "Good Life". It would be their only single as a fivesome. "Good Life" was not a hit, peaking at No. 79 on the Billboard Hot R&B/Hip-Hop Singles chart. At the time of the single's release, the members' age differences created a problem with marketing. Subsequently, The Braxtons were dropped from Arista Records.

In 1991, during a showcase with Antonio "L.A." Reid and Kenneth "Babyface" Edmonds, who were in the process of forming LaFace Records, Toni Braxton, minus her four sisters, was chosen and signed as the label's first female solo artist. At the time, the remaining members were told that LaFace was not looking for another girl group since it had just signed TLC.

After Toni's departure from the group in 1991, the remaining Braxtons members became backup singers for Toni's first U.S. tour, music videos, and promotional appearances. She was featured in the music video for Toni Braxton's third single, "Seven Whole Days", from her self-titled debut album.

In 1993, LaFace Records A&R Vice President, Bryant Reid, signed The Braxtons to LaFace. However, the group never released an album or single for the record label. When Reid moved on to work for Atlantic Records, he convinced executives at LaFace to allow him take the group to Atlantic also.

Composed of Trina, Towanda, and Tamar as The Braxtons, the group released their debut album entitled So Many Ways on August 13, 1996. The album peaked at number 26 on the Billboard R&B/Hip-Hop Albums charts. "So Many Ways" went on to peak at No. 83 on the Billboard Hot 100 chart in 1996, No. 22 on the Billboard R&B Charts and number 32 on the UK Singles Chart in January 1997. Shortly after the release of their album, The Braxtons toured as the opening act for the European Leg of Toni Braxton's Secrets Tour in 1997. The group disbanded after lead singer Tamar Braxton left to pursue a solo career with DreamWorks Records in 1998.

=== 1998–2014: Solo career ===
Braxton appeared in the 2004 Tyler Perry play Meet the Browns as Tracy Stevens. She was also part of the play Rise, written by Cheryl "Salt" James and Christopher "Play" Martin and starred in an off-Broadway production of Dreamgirls as Deena Jones. Later that year, she appeared in "The Walk" with Eva Pigford and Regina Belle. Additionally, she co-starred in two independent films, including Jail Party, and was host for the unbroadcast Urban Idol for UPN. In 2006, she toured as a backup singer for Toni Braxton's Libra Tour in 2006. She also performed in Toni Braxton: Revealed at the Flamingo Hotel and Casino.

In 2009, Trina joined the wedding band Simply Irresistible as a lead vocalist. She also made a cameo in Tyler Perry's I Can Do Bad All By Myself as a member of a band performing with singer Mary J. Blige's character. In 2011, Braxton reunited with her sisters for the WE tv reality show, Braxton Family Values. In 2012, Braxton began her solo career after signing with Soltri Entertainment. Her debut single, "Party or Go Home", was released on March 22, 2012. She guest starred on TV Land's sitcom The Soul Man.

In 2013, she released the single Game Time. The same year, she was featured on the song "The Chipmunk Song (Christmas Don't Be Late)", on her sister Tamar's Winter Loversland. In 2014, she landed a role in the TV movie Where's the Love.

=== 2015–present: Braxton Family Christmas, Sister Circle talk show and other projects ===
The group, including Toni, Tamar, Traci, Trina and Towanda, released Braxton Family Christmas on October 30, 2015. Braxton Family Christmas debuted at number 27 on the US Billboard R&B/Hip-Hop Albums, number 10 on the US R&B Chart and number 12 on US Top Holiday Albums on November 21, 2015. The album charted at number 1 on the US Heatseekers Albums on December 12, 2015.

On April 20, 2018, Braxton featured on her sister Traci Braxton's single "Broken Things". From September 10, 2018, to March 2020, Braxton served as a co-host of "Sister Circle" talk show for the TV One and TEGNA networks from 12:00 p.m. – 1 p.m., along with Quad Webb-Lunceford, Syleena Johnson and Rashan Ali. On October 20, 2018, she starred in the stage play Head Over Heels, alongside Angie Stone, Karyn White, Q Parker, William Jackson, Tony Tone & Big Que. On November 30, 2019, she starred in the BET Christmas movie Hip Hop Holiday.

On May 7, 2021, she appeared in the movie Sisters and the Shrink 2. The movie was available on Amazon. In May 2024, she executive produced and starred in reality series The Braxtons.

== Other endeavors ==
In parallel of her artistic career, she is the co-owner of the recording studio, The Bass Mint, located in Atlanta, which includes a recording studio and a studio to make films, television projects and music videos and founded her production company named Soltri Entertainment. In 2014, she had launched her first hair collection line. She had launched her first bar company Bar-Chix.

== Personal life ==
She has two sons.

In 2003, she married Air Force veteran and software developer Gabriel "Gabe" Solis, who appeared on the reality show. They separated in 2013 and their divorce was finalized in 2015. Solis died on December 20, 2018, of pancreatic cancer at the age of 43.

Several days prior to the Braxton Family Values Season 6 premiere, Braxton became engaged to boyfriend Von Scales while in Napa Valley. They married in December 2019. Scales died on October 1, 2026. In June 2021, Trina became a member of Alpha Kappa Alpha sorority.

== Discography ==
=== Singles ===
- 2012: "Party or Go Home"
- 2013: "Game Time"
- 2013: "All Over the World" (J. Ahmad, VaShawn Mitchell, Anthony David, Terrell Carter, Trina Braxton, Casme, Lisa Denise & Artia Lockett)

=== Other songs ===
- 2013: The Chipmunk Song (Christmas Don't Be Late) (Tamar Braxton duet with Trina Braxton)
- 2018: Broken Things (Traci Braxton featuring Toni Braxton, Towanda Braxton and Trina Braxton)

== Filmography ==
=== Films ===
- 2004: Meet the Browns as Tracey
- 2005: Jail Party as Kiana
- 2005: The Walk as Dawn
- 2009: I Can Do Bad All by Myself (cameo)
- 2014: Where's the Love? as Kendra (TV movie)
- 2015: Side Piece as herself
- 2019: Hip Hop Holiday as Karen Corvey
- 2021: Sisters and the Shrink 2 as First Lady

=== TV series ===
- 2011–2020 :Braxton Family Values (as herself, 2011–2020)
- 2018: Iyanla: Fix My Life (as herself,)
- 2018–2020: Sister Circle (co-host, as herself)
- 2024-present:The Braxtons (as herself, 2024-present)

== Theatre ==
- 2004: Dreamgirls as Deena Jones
- 2004: Meet the Browns as Tracy Stevens
- 2018: Head Over Heels
