= List of songs recorded by Tamar Braxton =

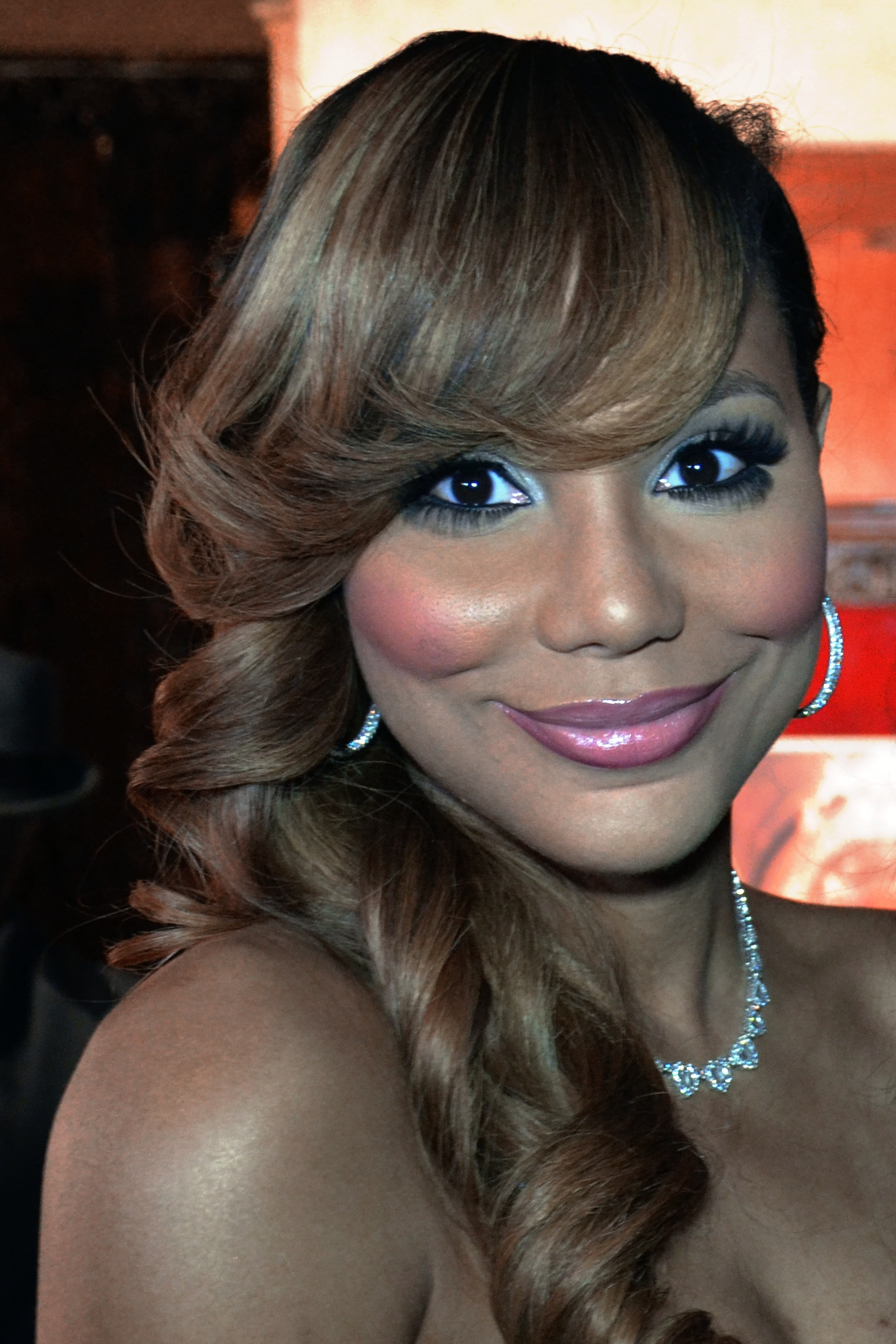
Braxton in 2012.

American singer Tamar Braxton has recorded songs for five studio albums, two extended plays (EPs), as well as singles, soundtrack contributions, and guest appearances. Her early recordings include the songs "Call Me" and "We're All in This Together (The NFL Anthem)" from the compilation album NFL Jams (1998), as well as four tracks from her EP Just Cuz: "Just Cuz", "It's Time" featuring Grand Puba, "Get Mine", and "Let Him Go" featuring Solé. The songs on Just Cuz were written by Braxton in collaboration with songwriters including Isaac Hayes III, Tab, Christopher Stewart, and Tameka Cottle, while "It's Time" was written by Antoinette Roberson, Darrell "Delite" Allamby, and Lincoln Browder.

Braxton released her self-titled debut studio album, Tamar, in 2000 under the mononym Tamar. The album featured songs written by Braxton with collaborators including Tricky Stewart, Tab, Tim & Bob, and Darrell Allamby. Its tracks included "Get Mine", "If You Don't Wanna Love Me", and "I'm Over You", while "Get None" featured Jermaine Dupri and Amil. After a hiatus from releasing studio albums, Braxton returned with Love and War (2013), which featured the title track, "The One", "All the Way Home", and "Hot Sugar". The songs included collaborations with songwriters such as LaShawn Daniels, Makeba Riddick, and Darhyl Camper Jr. She also released the Christmas album Winter Loversland in 2013, featuring covers of holiday standards such as "Santa Baby", "Silent Night", and "Sleigh Ride".

Braxton's fourth studio album, Calling All Lovers, was released in 2015. Its songs included "Angels & Demons", "If I Don't Have You", "Broken Record", and "Catfish", with writing contributions from Daniels, Tricky Stewart, and other collaborators. Her fifth studio album, Bluebird of Happiness (2017), featured the singles "My Man" and "Blind", alongside songs such as "Heart in My Hands" and "Empty Boxes". In an interview with the Recording Academy, Braxton said she wrote every song on the album except one, emphasizing her involvement as both a vocalist and songwriter.

Beyond her studio albums, Braxton has contributed songs to film soundtracks, including "Try Me" for Kingdom Come (2001) and "If You Dream" for More Than a Game: Music Inspired by the Film (2009). Her other collaborations include "4 the Love of You" with Solé, "My Babooski" with Master P, "Don't Go" with Silk, "For the Rest of My Life, Pt. 2" with Robin Thicke, and "Something We Can Make Love To" with Eric Benét. She has also recorded theme songs for television projects, including "Braxton Family Values Theme Song" with The Braxtons and "You're My Monday & My Friday" with Vincent Herbert.

Braxton released the single "Crazy Kind of Love" for the soundtrack of True to the Game 2 (2020), followed by non-album singles "Changed" (2023) and "Notice Me" (2024). In November 2025, she released Heartbreak Retrograde, a six-track EP featuring "4am", "Letter to a Leo", "Love Me", "WYKYK", "You On You", and "Safer". The EP marked her first project in eight years, and "You On You" reached number three on Billboard's Adult R&B Airplay chart. In 2026, Braxton appeared alongside Candiace Dillard Bassett on "If Only... (SHEmix)".

== Songs ==
=== As lead artist ===
Key
†	Indicates single release
#	Indicates promotional single release

List of songs recorded by Tamar Braxton
Song	Artist(s)	Writer(s)	Album(s)	Year	Ref.
"4am"	Tamar Braxton	Tamar Braxton; Tricky Stewart; Chelsey Pauls; Ben Parris	Heartbreak Retrograde	2025	
All the Way Home †	Tamar Braxton	Harvey Mason Jr. Damon Thomas; Michael Daley; Terrence Coles; Joelle James; Amber "Sevyn" Streeter; Steven "Lil Steve" Russell	Love and War	2013	
"Angels & Demons" †	Tamar Braxton	Tamar Braxton; Atozzio Towns; Edsel Alexander; Kameron Glasper; Tiyon "TC" Mack; Melvin Hough II; Rivelino Wouter	Calling All Lovers	2015	
"A.S.A.P."	Tamar Braxton	Tamar Braxton; Makeba Riddick-Woods; LaShawn Daniels; Ernest Clark; Marcos Palacios; Mykal Snoddy	Calling All Lovers (Walmart deluxe edition)	2015	
Away in a Manger / Little Drummer Boy	Tamar Braxton	Katherine K. Davis; Henry Onorati; Harry Simeone	Winter Loversland	2013	
"Black Tears"	Tamar Braxton	Tamar Braxton; Tiyon "TC" Mack	Love and War (Best Buy edition)	2013	
"Blind" †	Tamar Braxton	Tamar Braxton; Jenkins; Vincent Berry II; Carmen Reecey; Billy Foster; Ellington Jordan	Bluebird of Happiness	2017	
"Broken Record"	Tamar Braxton	Tamar Braxton; LaShawn Daniels; Jamal Jones; Steven Easley; Kristal "Brave Jaxon" Murphy	Calling All Lovers	2015	
"Can't Nobody"	Tamar Braxton	Tricky Stewart	Tamar	2000	
"Catfish" #	Tamar Braxton	Tamar Braxton; LaShawn Daniels; Jamal Jones; Atia Boggs	Calling All Lovers	2015	
"Changed" †	Tamar Braxton	Tamar Braxton; Amber Smith; Charles Stephens; Donald "haZEL" Sales; Norman Gyamfi; Nyerere Davidson	Non-album release	2023	
"Circles" #	Tamar Braxton	Tamar Braxton; Anthony D'Andre Bennett; McKenzie Brooke Lawson; Tiyon "TC" Mack	Calling All Lovers	2015	
"Coming Home"	Tamar Braxton	Tamar Braxton; Harvey Mason Jr. Damon Thomas; Patrick "J. Que" Smith; Dewain Whitmore; Amber Streeter	Calling All Lovers (Deluxe edition)	2015	
"Count the Ways"	Tamar Braxton	Richard Rudolph; Shane August	Tamar (Japanese edition)	2000	
"Crazy Kind of Love" †	Tamar Braxton	Chrishan; Michael Masser; Gerry Goffin; Paul Cabbin; Hitmaka	True to the Game 2	2020	
"Don't Cry"	Tamar	Tab; Tricky Stewart	Non-album release	1999	
"Empty Boxes"	Tamar Braxton	Tamar Braxton; Vincent Berry II; LaShawn Daniels; LaJoel Augustin; Don Corleone; Joshua Berry; Rob Ingouma; Jean-Guy Leconte	Bluebird of Happiness	2017	
"Free Fallin'"	Tamar Braxton	Tamar Braxton; Muhammed Ayers	Calling All Lovers	2015	
"Get Mine"	Tamar Braxton	Tricky Stewart; Tamar Braxton	Tamar	2000	
"Get None" †	Tamar featuring Jermaine Dupri and Amil	Jermaine Dupri; Bryan-Michael Cox; Tamara Savage; Mýa Harrison; Amil Whitehead	Tamar	1999	
"Have Yourself a Merry Little Christmas"	Tamar Braxton	Ralph Blane; Hugh Martin	Winter Loversland	2013	
"Heart in My Hands"	Tamar Braxton	Tamar Braxton; Rodney Jerkins; Priscilla Renea	Bluebird of Happiness	2017	
"Hol' Up"	Tamar Braxton featuring Yo Gotti	Tamar Braxton; Tiyon "TC" Mack; Hi Jackson; O'Kelly Isley; Ronald Isley; Rudolph Isley	Bluebird of Happiness	2017	
"Hot Sugar" †	Tamar Braxton	Tamar Braxton; Kyle Stewart II; LaShawn Daniels; Chris Brown; Makeba Riddick-Woods	Love and War	2013	
"How I Feel"	Tamar Braxton	Tamar Braxton; Vincent Berry II; Mike Jimenez; Malcolm Harvest	Bluebird of Happiness	2017	
"If I Don't Have You" †	Tamar Braxton	Tamar Braxton; Makeba Riddick-Woods; LaShawn Daniels; Ernest Clark; Marcos Palacios; Tiyon "TC" Mack; Tony Russell; Kevin Randolph	Calling All Lovers	2015	
"If You Don't Wanna Love Me" †	Tamar Braxton	Tricky Stewart; LaTocha Scott	Tamar	2000	
"I Love You"	Tamar Braxton	Tamar Braxton; Khari "Needlz" Cain; Brandon "Donut" Bell; Tiffany Fred; Brenda Gordon Russell	Calling All Lovers	2015	
"I'm Leaving"	Tamar Braxton featuring Bump J	Tamar Braxton; Terrance Michael Boykin; Cory Rooney; Gregory Bruno	Non-album release	2004	
"I'm Over You"	Tamar Braxton	Tricky Stewart; Tamar Braxton	Tamar	2000	
"It's Time"	Tamar Braxton featuring Grand Puba	Antoinette Roberson; Darrell "Delite" Allamby; Lincoln Browder	Just Cuz	1999	
"Just Cuz"	Tamar Braxton	Tamar Braxton; Isaac Hayes III; Tab; Tameka Cottle; Tricky Stewart	Just Cuz	1999	
"King"	Tamar Braxton	Tamar Braxton; Fred	Calling All Lovers	2015	
"Let Me Know" †	Tamar Braxton featuring Future	Tamar Braxton; Al Sherrod "A-Rod" Lambert; Ericka Coulter; Ronald Isley; Ernie Isley; Rudolph Isley; O'Kelly Isley Jr. Chris Jasper	Calling All Lovers (Walmart deluxe edition)	2014	
"Let Him Go"	Tamar Braxton featuring Solé	Tamar Braxton; Tab; Tricky Stewart	Just Cuz	1999	
"Letter to a Leo"	Tamar Braxton	Tamar Braxton; Tricky Stewart; Chelsey Pauls; Ben Parris	Heartbreak Retrograde	2025	
"Love and War" †	Tamar Braxton	Tamar Braxton; Darhyl Camper Jr. LaShawn Daniels; Makeba Riddick-Woods	Love and War	2012	
"Love It"	Tamar Braxton	Tamar Braxton; Keon Young; Isaac White; Vurdell "VScript" Muller; Denisia Keys; Tiyon "TC" Mack	Calling All Lovers	2015	
"Love Me"	Tamar Braxton	Tamar Braxton; Tricky Stewart; Ben Parris; Jeremiah "Sick Pen" Bethea	Heartbreak Retrograde	2025	
"Makin' Love"	Tamar Braxton	Tamar Braxton; Timothy Paul Hinshaw; Tiyon "TC" Mack	Calling All Lovers	2015	
"Merry Christmas Darling"	Tamar Braxton	Richard Carpenter; Frank Pooler	Winter Loversland	2013	
"Miss Your Kiss"	Tamar Braxton	Tim Kelley; Bob Robinson	Tamar	2000	
"Money Can't Buy You Love" #	Tamar Braxton	Darrell "Delite" Allamby; Lincoln "Link" Browder	Tamar	2000	
"Must Be Good to You"	Tamar Braxton	Tamar Braxton; Dashawn "Happie" White; Makeba Riddick-Woods; Courtney Harrell	Calling All Lovers	2015	
"My Forever"	Tamar Braxton	Tamar Braxton; Tiyon "TC" Mack; Shinique Owens	Bluebird of Happiness	2017	
"My Man" †	Tamar Braxton	Tamar Braxton; Cory Rooney	Bluebird of Happiness	2017	
"Never"	Tamar Braxton	Tamar Braxton; Brian Alexander Morgan; Candice Boyd; Tiyon "TC" Mack; Patricia Austin; Peggy Lipton Jones; John Robertson; David James Wolinski	Calling All Lovers	2015	
"No Disrespect"	Tamar Braxton featuring Missy Elliott	Missy Elliott	Tamar	2000	
"No Gift"	Tamar Braxton	Tamar Braxton; LaShawn Daniels; Tiyon "TC" Mack; Adonis Shropshire	Winter Loversland	2013	
"Notice Me" †	Tamar Braxton	Tamar Braxton; Amber Dion Smith; Donald "haZEL" Sales; Nyerere Davidson	Non-album release	2024	
"Once Again"	Tamar Braxton	Darrell "Delite" Allamby	Tamar	2000	
"One on One Fun"	Tamar Braxton	Tamar Braxton; LaShawn Daniels; Angela Hunte; Thomas Wesley Pentz	Love and War	2013	
"Pick Me Up" #	Tamar Braxton	Tamar Braxton; Makeba Riddick-Woods; Troy Taylor; Michael Jones	Bluebird of Happiness	2017	
"Pieces"	Tamar Braxton	Bryan-Michael Paul Cox; Kendrick A.J. Dean; Amber Streeter; Anthony Franks; Brandon Sewell; Ashley Rose Collier; Michael "M. Bass" Elemba; Jasper Murray; Delante Murphy; Quentin Deberry	Love and War	2013	
"Prettiest Girl"	Tamar Braxton	Tamar Braxton; Tiyon "TC" Mack; Troy Oliver	Love and War	2013	
"Raise the Bar"	Tamar Braxton	Tamar Braxton; Darhyl "DJ" Camper; Claude Kelly	Calling All Lovers	2015	
"Run Run"	Tamar Braxton	Tamar Braxton; Makeba Riddick Woods; Troy Taylor; Winston Riley	Bluebird of Happiness	2017	
"Safer"	Tamar Braxton	Tamar Braxton; Tricky Stewart; Ben Parris; Jeremiah "Sick Pen" Bethea	Heartbreak Retrograde	2025	
"Santa Baby"	Tamar Braxton	Joan Javits; Philip Springer; Tony Springer	Winter Loversland	2013	
"Santa Bring My Baby (Winter Loversland)"	Tamar Braxton	—	Winter Loversland (Deluxe edition)	2013	
"Santa Claus Is Coming to Town"	Tamar Braxton	J. Fred Coots; Haven Gillespie	Winter Loversland	2013	
"She Can Have You" #	Tamar Braxton	Tamar Braxton; LaShawn Daniels; Tiyon "TC" Mack	Winter Loversland	2013	
"She Did That"	Tamar Braxton	Marcos Palacios; Ernest Clark; LaShawn Daniels; Makeba Riddick-Woods	Love and War	2013	
"Silent Night"	Tamar Braxton	Franz Xaver Gruber; Joseph Mohr	Winter Loversland	2013	
"Simple Things"	Tamar Braxton	Tamar Braxton; LaShawn Daniels; Jamal Jones; Elvis Williams; Felisha King	Calling All Lovers	2015	
"Sleigh Ride"	Tamar Braxton	Leroy Anderson; Mitchell Parish	Winter Loversland	2013	
"S.O.N."	Tamar Braxton	Tamar Braxton; LaShawn Daniels; Larry Griffin Jr. Stuart Lowery; Tiyon "TC" Mack	Calling All Lovers (Deluxe edition)	2015	
"Sound of Love"	Tamar Braxton	Tamar Braxton; Ricardo "Rico Beats" Lamarre; Tiyon "TC" Mack	Love and War	2013	
"Stay and Fight"	Tamar Braxton	Tricky Stewart; Lindsay "Mavelle" Gilbert; Sergio "Reverse" Van Gonter	Love and War	2013	
"Thank You Lord"	Tamar Braxton	Tramaine Winfrey; Tiyon "TC" Mack	Love and War	2013	
"The Chipmunk Song (Christmas Don't Be Late)"	Tamar Braxton with Trina Braxton	Ross Bagdasarian	Winter Loversland	2013	
"The Gift"	Tamar Braxton	Tricky Stewart; Ben Parris; Elizabeth Loughrey	Non-album release	2025	
"The Makings of You" #	Tamar Braxton	Tamar Braxton; Rodney "Darkchild" Jerkins; Jared Thorne; Anesha Birchett; Antea Birchett; Curtis Mayfield	Bluebird of Happiness	2018	
"The One" †	Tamar Braxton	Tamar Braxton; Christian "Yung Berg" Ward; Shaunice Lasha Jones; LaShawn Daniels; James Mtume; Sean Combs; Jean-Claude Oliver; Christopher Wallace; Kevin Erondu	Love and War	2013	
"The Way It Should Be"	Tamar Braxton	Tricky Stewart; Tamar Braxton	Tamar	2000	
"Tip Toe"	Tamar Braxton	Tamar Braxton; Marcos Palacios; Ernest Clark; Priscilla Renea; Ericka J. Coulter	Love and War	2013	
"Tonight"	Tamar Braxton	Tim Kelley; Bob Robinson	Tamar	2000	
"Wanna Love You Boy" #	Tamar Braxton	Tamar Braxton; Eric Bellinger; Robin Thicke; Pharrell Williams	Bluebird of Happiness	2017	
"Watchin' Me (Yep, I Know It)"	Tamar Braxton	—	Winter Loversland (Deluxe edition)	2013	
"Where It Hurts"	Tamar Braxton	Tamar Braxton; Bryan-Michael Cox; Patrick "J. Que" Smith; Kenneth "Babyface" Edmonds; LaShawn Daniels	Love and War	2013	
"White Candle"	Tamar Braxton	Tamar Braxton; Tiyon "TC" Mack; Eric Mobley; Ursula Yancy	Love and War	2013	
"Words"	Tamar Braxton	Tim Kelley; Bob Robinson	Tamar	2000	
"WYKYK"	Tamar Braxton	Tamar Braxton; Tricky Stewart; Ben Parris; Big Korey; Chelsey Pauls; Brian Gregory Thomas	Heartbreak Retrograde	2025	
"You Bring the Love"	Tamar Braxton	Claude Kelly; Chuck Harmony	Non-album release	2023	
"You Don't Know"	Tamar Braxton	Tim Kelley; Bob Robinson	Tamar	2000	
"You On You" †	Tamar Braxton	Sebastian Gasca; Darius Johnson; Rafael Dewayne Ishman; Korey B. Roberson; Suzanne Vega; Christopher A. Stewart	Heartbreak Retrograde	2025	
"Your Room"	Tamar Braxton	Tim Kelley; Bob Robinson	Tamar	2000	

=== As featured artist ===
Key
†	Indicates single release

List of featured songs and other appearances by Tamar Braxton
Song	Artist(s)	Writer(s)	Album(s)	Year	Ref.
"4 the Love of You"	Solé featuring Tamar Braxton	Chuckey Charles; Tonya Johnston	Skin Deep	1999	
"Braxton Family Values Theme Song"	Tamar Braxton with The Braxtons	No published liner-note credit located	Braxton Family Values (theme song; non-album release)	2011	
"Call Me"	Tamar Braxton, Scott Galbraith, Nicci Gilbert, and Sam Salter	L. Scott; C. Stewart	NFL Jams	1998	
"Don't Go"	Silk featuring Tamar Braxton	Darrell "Delite" Allamby; Gary "Lil' G" Jenkins; Lincoln "Link" Browder; Marcus Devine	Love Session	2001	
"For the Rest of My Life, Pt. 2" †	Robin Thicke and Tamar Braxton	Pro-Jay; Robin Thicke	Blurred Lines (single version)	2014	
"I Love You" †	Mr. P featuring Teni, Simi, and Tamar Braxton	Peter Okoye; Simi; Tamar Braxton; Teni	The Prodigal	2021	
"If Only... (SHEmix)" †	Candiace Dillard Bassett and Tamar Braxton	Candiace Dillard Bassett; Tamar Braxton; Triangle Park; Yonatan Watts; Antoine Harris; Cynthia Biggs El; Dashawn White; Dexter Wansel; Kenny Gamble; Nyerere Davidson; Tylon Freeman	If Only... The Remixes	2026	
"If You Dream"	Various artists, including Tank, Tyrese Gibson, Toni Braxton, Jordin Sparks, Omarion, Faith Evans, JoJo, Charlie Wilson, Tamar Braxton, and Lake View Terrace Voices of Praise	Durrell "Tank" Babbs; J. Valentine; Robert Newt; Harvey Mason Jr. Jerry "Texx" Franklin; Kristina Stephens; Thai Jones; J. "Lonny" Bereal	More Than a Game: Music Inspired by the Film	2009	
"Lions and Tigers and Bears"	Tamar Braxton (vocals on Todrick Hall's album)	Todrick Hall	Straight Outta Oz (Deluxe edition)	2017	
"My Babooski"	Master P featuring Tamar Braxton	Master P	Ghetto Postage	2000	
"National Anthem"	Tamar Braxton	Todrick Hall	Forbidden	2018	
"Now I Only Dance for You"	T. D. Jakes and Tamar Braxton	T. D. Jakes; Darin Whittington	Sacred Love Songs	1999	
"Something We Can Make Love To" †	Eric Benét and Tamar Braxton	Phillip Lane Stewart; Rafael Dewayne Ishman; Terius Gesteelde-Diamant	Duets	2024	
"Try Me"	One Nation Crew and Tamar Braxton	Kirk Franklin	Kingdom Come	2001	
"We're All in This Together (The NFL Anthem)"	Various artists, including Tamar Braxton	Dave Alexander; Ashley Ambrose; Jamie Asher; Roy Barker; David Binn; Jeff Blake; Tamar Braxton; Foxy Brown	NFL Jams	1998	
"You're My Monday & My Friday"	Tamar Braxton and Vincent Herbert	No published liner-note credit located	Tamar & Vince (theme song; non-album release)	2012	
