= Tamar Braxton discography =

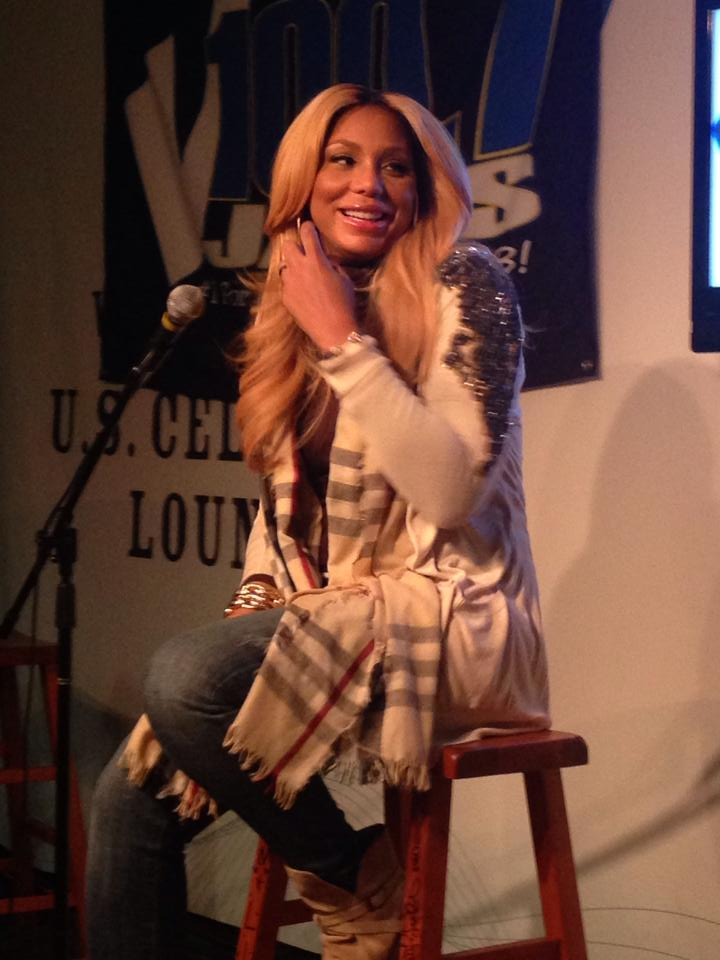
- Braxton in 2013
- Studio albums: 5
- EPs: 2
- Singles: 12
- Music videos: 15
- Guest appearances: 7

The discography of American R&B singer Tamar Braxton consists of five studio albums, two extended plays, twelve singles, seven guest appearances, and fifteen music videos.

== Albums ==
=== Studio albums ===
Title	Album details	Peak positions			Sales
Title	Album details	US	US R&B	UK R&B	Sales
Tamar	Released: March 21, 2000; Label: DreamWorks Records; Formats: CD, cassette	127	42	—	
Love and War	Released: September 3, 2013; Label: Epic Records, Streamline Records; Formats: CD, digital download	2	1	34	US: 557,000
Winter Loversland	Released: November 11, 2013; Label: Epic Records, Streamline Records; Formats: CD, digital download	43	11	—	US: 8,000
Calling All Lovers	Released: October 2, 2015; Label: Epic Records, Streamline Records; Formats: CD, digital download	5	2	16	US: 36,919
Bluebird of Happiness	Released: September 29, 2017; Label: LoganLand, eOne; Formats: CD, digital download	14	8	—	US: 19,560
"—" denotes a recording that did not chart or was not released in that territory.

== Extended plays ==
Title	EP details
Just Cuz / Ridiculous	Released: February 1999; Label: DreamWorks Records; Formats: Digital download, CD, LP
Heartbreak Retrograde	Released: November 7, 2025; Label: Tamar Braxton Productions, Platform Records; Formats: Digital download

== Singles ==
Title	Year	Peak chart positions							Certifications	Album
Title	Year	US	US R&B	US R&B/HH	US R&B/HH Airplay	US Adult R&B	US R&B Dig.	US Dig.	Certifications	Album
"Get None" (featuring Jermaine Dupri and Amil)	1999	—	—	59	—	—	—	—		Tamar
"If You Don't Wanna Love Me"	2000	89	—	30	70	28	—	—		Tamar
"Love and War"	2012	57	5	13	2	1	3	12	RIAA: Platinum	Love and War
"The One"	2013	—	10	34	9	2	5	63	RIAA: Gold	Love and War
"All the Way Home"	2013	96	9	32	19	8	13	—	RIAA: Platinum	Love and War
"Hot Sugar"	2013	—	13	48	—	—	9	—		Love and War
"For the Rest of My Life, Pt. 2" (with Robin Thicke)	2014	—	20	—	—	1	—	—		Blurred Lines
"Let Me Know" (featuring Future)	2014	—	12	31	8	5	6	—		Non-album single
"If I Don't Have You"	2015	—	18	—	19	6	17	—		Calling All Lovers
"Catfish"	2015	—	—	—	48	19	—	—		Calling All Lovers
"Angels & Demons"	2015	—	—	—	—	—	—	—		Calling All Lovers
"My Man"	2017	—	21	—	19	3	20	—		Bluebird of Happiness
"Blind"	2017	—	—	—	—	23	—	—		Bluebird of Happiness
"Crazy Kind of Love"	2020	—	—	—	18	2	—	—		True to the Game 2: Gena's Story
"Changed"	2023	—	21	—	17	2	15	—		TBA
"Notice Me"	2024	—	—	—	—	—	2	—		TBA
"Something We Can Make Love To" (with Eric Benét)	2024	—	24	—	14	1	—	—		Duets
"You on You"	2025	—	—	—	20	3	—	—		Heartbreak Retrograde
"—" denotes a recording that did not chart or was not released in that territory.

=== Promotional singles ===
List of promotional singles, with selected chart positions
Title	Year	Peak chart positions	Album
Title	Year	US Holiday Dig.	Album
"Money Can't Buy You Love"	2000	—	Tamar
"I'm Leaving" (featuring Bump J)	2004	—	Non-album promotional single
"She Can Have You"	2013	35	Winter Loversland
"You Bring the Love"	2023	—	Non-album promnotional single

== Other charted songs ==
Title	Year	Peak chart positions		Album
Title	Year	US Gospel Dig.	US R&B Dig.	Album
"Thank You Lord"	2013	8	—	Love and War
"King"	2015	—	19	Calling All Lovers

== Other appearances ==
Title	Year	Other performer(s)	Album
"Call Me"	1998	Scott Galbraith, Nicci Gilbert, Sam Salter	NFL Jams
"We're All in This Together (The NFL Anthem)"	1998	Various artists	NFL Jams
"Now I Only Dance for You"	1999	T. D. Jakes	Sacred Love Songs
"4 the Love of You"	1999	Solé	Skin Deep
"My Babooski"	2000	Master P	Ghetto Postage
"Don't Go"	2001	Silk	Love Session
"Try Me"	2001	Various artists	Kingdom Come: The Soundtrack
"If You Dream"	2009	Various artists	More than a Game
"Braxton Family Values Theme Song"	2011	with The Braxtons	Braxton Family Values
"You're My Monday & My Friday"	2012	Vincent Herbert	Tamar & Vince Theme Song
"Sleigh Ride"	2014	Various artists	I'll Be Home for Christmas (compilation EP)
"Lions and Tigers and Bears"	2017	Todrick Hall	Straight Outta Oz: Deluxe Edition
"National Anthem"	2018	Todrick Hall	Forbidden

== Music videos ==
As lead artist
Title	Year	Other artist(s)	Director	Ref.
"Get None"	1999	Jermaine Dupri and Amil	Darren Grant	
"If You Don't Wanna Love Me"	2000	—N/a	Diane Martel	
"Love and War"	2013	—N/a	Walid Azami	
"The One"	2013	—N/a	Gil Green	
"Hot Sugar"	2013	—N/a	Steven Gomillion, Dennis Leupold and Tamar Braxton	
"She Can Have You"	2013	—N/a	Erik White	
"All the Way Home"	2013	—N/a	Erik White	
"Let Me Know"	2014	Future	Tamar Braxton	
"If I Don't Have You"	2015	—N/a	Darren Craig	
"Angels & Demons"	2015	—N/a	Darren Craig	
"My Man"	2017	—N/a	Laurieann Gibson	
"Prettiest Girl"	2018	—N/a		
"The Makings of You"	2018	—N/a	Supa Coop	
"Love It"	2018	—N/a		
"Wanna Love You Boy"	2018	—N/a		
"Pieces"	2018	—N/a		
"Crazy Kind of Love"	2020	—N/a	—N/a	
"Notice Me"	2024	—N/a	—N/a	
"You on You"	2025	—N/a	Slick Two Three; Jamaal Avery	

As featured artist
Title	Year	Other artist(s)
"I Love You"	2021	Mr. P Simi; Teni
"Something We Can Make Love To"	2024	Eric Benét
"If Only… (Remix)"	2026	Candiace Dillard Bassett
