= Love and War 10th Anniversary Tour =

2023–2024 concert tour by Tamar Braxton

- Tour by Tamar Braxton
- Location: United States
- Associated album: Love and War (2013)
- Start date: October 22, 2023
- End date: January 20, 2024
- No. of shows: 12
- Supporting acts: Nivea; Tiffany Evans; Drew Sidora; Candiace Dillard Bassett; Teairra Mari

Tamar Braxton concert chronology
- Love and War Tour (2014); Love and War 10th Anniversary Tour (2023-2024); The October Nights: Calling All Lovers Tour (2025)

The Love and War 10th Anniversary Tour (also promoted as the Love and War 10 Year Anniversary Tour) was a concert tour by American singer Tamar Braxton. Organized to commemorate the tenth anniversary of her second studio album, Love and War (2013), the tour began on October 22, 2023, in Dallas, Texas, and concluded on January 20, 2024, in Detroit, Michigan. The tour was announced in September 2023 and initially consisted of four dates before being expanded with additional performances.

The tour featured special guest appearances by several R&B performers, including Nivea, Tiffany Evans, Drew Sidora, Candiace Dillard Bassett, and Teairra Mari. Braxton described the production as a personally financed undertaking, explaining that she organized it independently of a record label, manager, or agent. During its run, the tour received praise for Braxton's vocal performances and audience engagement, although it was also associated with several public disputes and schedule changes.

== Background and announcement ==
In 2013, Braxton released her second studio album, Love and War, on September 3 through Streamline Records and Epic Records. The album debuted at number two on the US Billboard 200 with 114,000 copies sold in its first week. It received three nominations at the 56th Annual Grammy Awards, including Best Urban Contemporary Album, while its title track received nominations for Best R&B Song and Best R&B Performance. The singles "Love and War", "The One", and "All the Way Home" also achieved success on the Billboard Adult R&B Airplay chart. To commemorate the album's tenth anniversary, Braxton announced the tour on September 6, 2023, during an appearance on Baltimore radio station 92Q Jams' The Quicksilva Show. The initial itinerary consisted of four concerts, beginning October 24 at Irving Plaza in New York City, followed by performances in Atlanta, Georgia; Silver Spring, Maryland; and Detroit, Michigan. A ticket presale began September 7, with general ticket sales opening the following day. The itinerary was subsequently expanded to include a performance at the House of Blues in Dallas on October 22 and a second concert at Atlanta's Buckhead Theatre on October 29. A Los Angeles performance at The Novo was also included in the updated schedule. The concerts were promoted as an opportunity to revisit the album and celebrate its continued significance to Braxton's career.

In September 2023, Braxton explained that the production was independently financed. During an interview on The Rickey Smiley Morning Show, she stated that the tour was organized without the backing of a record deal, manager, or agent. "I put this tour together all on my own, so it really means a lot to me that everyone supports it," she said. The November 10 performance at The Novo in Los Angeles featured a surprise appearance by Braxton's older sister, singer Toni Braxton. The sisters performed "Dingaling of Gold", a comedic song previously associated with their reality television series Braxton Family Values. In November, Braxton announced an additional series of performances for December 2023 and January 2024. The expanded itinerary included concerts in Orlando, Florida; New Orleans, Louisiana; San Francisco, California; Charlotte, North Carolina; and Raleigh, North Carolina. A January 20 return to Detroit was also retained on the schedule.

== Reception ==
Reviewing the October 30 performance at The Fillmore Silver Spring for Parklife DC, Mecie Gold praised the singer's stage presence and energetic performance. Gold highlighted the combination of high-tempo songs and slower vocal showcases, describing Braxton's voice as "powerful and soulful." The review also singled out "Prettiest Girl" as a crowd favorite and praised the tribute to Braxton's late sister, Traci Braxton, through a performance of "Last Call". Gold also praised Braxton's interaction with the audience, particularly during the closing performance of "Love and War", when she invited concertgoers onto the stage to sing alongside her. The review described the performance as "a night to remember", noting the emotional connection between the singer and her audience.

The October 27 Atlanta concert at the Buckhead Theatre was reported as sold out, leading to the scheduling of a second Atlanta performance two days later. In December 2023, Braxton announced that the tour had sold out 15 locations. In a statement celebrating the audience response, she expressed gratitude for the support she had received and described the achievement as particularly meaningful because she had organized the production independently. However, the available reporting did not provide an aggregate box-office gross, total attendance figure, or venue-by-venue ticket revenue for the tour.

== Controversies ==
=== November 10 backstage altercation ===
During the November 10, 2023, performance at The Novo in Los Angeles, social media personality Chrisean Rock made an appearance alongside Braxton. The appearance was followed by reports of a physical altercation backstage involving Rock and Braxton's background singer, James Wright Chanel. In a November 13 social media statement, Braxton addressed the incident, confirming that Wright Chanel had been assaulted. She stated, "He got assaulted at my show, and it was by Chrisean." Braxton explained that she had invited Rock to participate in a dance segment rather than perform as a musical guest. She also apologized to her team and Rock, expressing regret that the situation had escalated into violence.

=== Dispute over promotional footage ===
In December 2023, Braxton's former friend and associate LeTroy Davis publicly accused her of using promotional footage for the tour without compensating the people involved in its production. The dispute began after Braxton shared a promotional video on social media on December 14. Davis claimed ownership of the footage and alleged that he had previously requested that it not be used without permission. He also stated that he had offered the singer the opportunity to acquire the rights to the material. Davis additionally claimed that he had been involved in planning the tour and publicly demanded that the promotional footage be removed. Braxton appeared to respond indirectly on social media, criticizing people who accepted negative claims about her without hearing her side. The dispute became part of a wider public disagreement between the singer and former members of her team.

=== Schedule changes ===
On December 27, 2023, Braxton announced that three remaining concerts would be canceled and rescheduled because of what she described as "situations beyond our control". She also revealed that she had assembled a new team and intended to make up the affected dates during 2024. In the same statement, she reiterated that the tour had sold out 15 locations and thanked fans for their continued support. Subsequent concert listings documented performances in Charlotte, Raleigh, and Detroit during January 2024, although the available announcement did not specify which three original dates were affected by the changes.

== Set list ==
1. "Tip Toe"
2. "Hot Sugar"
3. "She Did That"
4. "One on One Fun"
5. "Hol' Up"
6. "All the Way Home"
7. "Pieces"
8. "Empty Boxes"
9. "Circles"
10. "If You Don't Wanna Love Me"
11. "White Candle"
12. "Stay and Fight"
13. "Blind"
14. "How I Feel"
15. "The One"
16. "Love It"
17. "Let Me Know"
18. "My Man"
19. "Changed"
20. "Prettiest Girl"

Encore

1. "Love and War"

== Tour dates ==
List of 2023–2024 concerts
Date	City	Venue	Supporting acts and special appearances
October 22, 2023	Dallas	House of Blues	Nivea, Tiffany Evans
October 24, 2023	New York City	Irving Plaza	Tiffany Evans
October 27, 2023	Atlanta	Buckhead Theatre	Drew Sidora
October 29, 2023	Atlanta	Buckhead Theatre	Drew Sidora
October 30, 2023	Silver Spring	The Fillmore Silver Spring	Candiace Dillard Bassett
November 10, 2023	Los Angeles	The Novo	Toni Braxton (special appearance)
December 8, 2023	Lake Buena Vista	House of Blues	—
December 22, 2023	New Orleans	House of Blues	—
December 29, 2023	San Francisco	The Warfield	—
January 13, 2024	Charlotte	The Fillmore Charlotte	—
January 19, 2024	Raleigh	The Ritz	—
January 20, 2024	Detroit	Sound Board Theater	Teairra Mari
