= While You Were Gone =

While You Were Gone may refer to:

While You Were Gone, album by Maria D'Luz

- "While You Were Gone", song by Kelly Price from Blue Streak (soundtrack)
- "While You Were Gone", song by Paul van Dyk from From Then On
- "While You Were Gone", song by Jay-Z from Girl's Best Friend
- "While You Were Gone", song by Jennifer Paige Flowers and Positively Somewhere
- "While You Were Gone", song by English heavy metal band Blaze Bayley, The Man Who Would Not Die (album) 2008
