= Hot Sugar =

Hot Sugar may mean:

- Hot Sugar (musician), an American record producer also known as Nick Koenig
- "Hot Sugar" (song), a song by Tamar Braxton from Love and War
- "Hot Sugar", a song by The Mooney Suzuki from Alive & Amplified
- "Hot Sugar", a song by Glass Animals from Dreamland
