= Love and War Tour =

2014 concert tour by Tamar Braxton

- Tour by Tamar Braxton
- Location: North America
- Associated album: Love and War
- Start date: May 16, 2014
- End date: June 23, 2014
- Legs: 1
- No. of shows: 20

Tamar Braxton concert chronology
- Love and War Tour (2014); Bluebird of Happiness Tour (2018)

The Love and War Tour was the first headlining concert tour by American singer-songwriter Tamar Braxton in support of her second studio album, Love and War (2013). The two-month tour started on May 16, 2014, spanning 20 shows in North America.

== Background ==
Following the release of her album, Braxton announced she would start a tour in the spring. Dates were officially released on March 28, 2014, with the tour beginning May 16, in Miami Beach.

Before the tour commenced, Braxton supported John Legend on his fall 2013 tour. From that experience, she stated: "When it comes to touring, you have to be very professional. People pay to come see you. You can't keep them waiting. That's very rude. And another thing John taught me the most is to be more organized. If not, you're a mess. And trust me, ain't nobody got time for that." Braxton would later tour with R. Kelly in 2014.

== Setlist ==
The following setlist was obtained from the concert held on May 16, 2014; at The Fillmore Miami Beach in Miami Beach, Florida. It does not represent all concerts for the duration of the tour.

1. "Instrumental Sequence" (contains elements of "She Did That")
2. "The One"
3. "Tip Toe"
4. "Pieces"
5. "Watchin' Me (Yep, I Know It)"
6. "Stay and Fight"
7. "Where It Hurts"
8. "Sound of Love"
9. "Dance Sequence" (contains elements of "2 Bitches (Danny Glover)" and "She Twerkin")
10. "One on One Fun"
11. "Hot Sugar"
12. "All the Way Home"
13. "Love and War"

== Tour dates ==
Date	City	Country	Venue
North America
May 16, 2014	Miami Beach	United States	The Fillmore Miami Beach
May 18, 2014	Lake Buena Vista	United States	House of Blues
May 21, 2014	Charlotte	United States	The Fillmore Charlotte
May 22, 2014	Silver Spring	United States	The Fillmore Silver Spring
May 23, 2014	Washington D.C.	United States	The Park at 14th
May 26, 2014	Upper Darby Township	United States	Tower Theater
May 28, 2014	New York City	United States	Irving Plaza
May 29, 2014	Boston	United States	Paradise Rock Club
May 30, 2014	Ledyard	United States	MGM Grand Theater
May 31, 2014	Newark	United States	Newark Symphony Hall
June 3, 2014	Detroit	United States	Garden Theater
June 6, 2014	Chicago	United States	Concord Music Hall
June 9, 2014	Chattanooga	United States	Track 29
June 11, 2014	Atlanta	United States	Tabernacle
June 14, 2014	Birmingham	United States	Iron City
June 16, 2014	Houston	United States	House of Blues
June 17, 2014	Dallas	United States	House of Blues
June 20, 2014	Las Vegas	United States	House of Blues
June 21, 2014	Los Angeles	United States	Club Nokia
June 23, 2014	San Francisco	United States	Regency Ballroom

Cancellations and rescheduled shows

May 26, 2014	Philadelphia, Pennsylvania	Theatre of Living Arts	Moved to the Tower Theater in Upper Darby Township, Pennsylvania

=== Box office score data ===
Venue	City	Tickets sold / Available	Gross revenue
Iron City	Birmingham	1,304 / 1,304 (100%)	$31,296
Club Nokia	Los Angeles	1,542 / 1,832 (84%)	$53,622
Regency Ballroom	San Francisco	1,322 / 1,424 (93%)	$36,590
