= The One (Tamar Braxton song) =

Single by Tamar Braxton

from the album Love and War
- Released: May 7, 2013
- Length: 2:54
- Label: Epic; Streamline
- Songwriters: Tamar Braxton; Christian Ward; Shaunice Lasha Jones; LaShawn Daniels; James Mtume; Sean Combs; Jean-Claude Oliver; Christopher Wallace; Kevin Erondu
- Producer: K.E. on the Track

Tamar Braxton singles chronology
"Love and War" (2012)	"The One" (2013)	"All the Way Home" (2013)

Music video
- "The One" on YouTube

"The One" is a song by American singer Tamar Braxton from her second studio album, Love and War, which was released on September 3, 2013. Braxton co-wrote the song with its producer, K.E. on the Track, along with LaShawn Daniels, Christian Ward, Jean-Claude Oliver, and Shaunice Lasha Jones. Epic and Streamline Records issued it as the album's second single on May 7, 2013. "The One" is about commitment to a romantic partner, and the production uses a sample of Mtume's "Juicy Fruit" (1983) and a portion of the Notorious B.I.G.'s "Juicy" (1994).

The song received positive reviews from critics who associated it with summer and praised Braxton's vocals. Reviewers commented on the use of samples, believing they were already overused in past music. The single peaked at number four on Billboard's Bubbling Under Hot 100 and number 34 on the Hot R&B/Hip-Hop Songs, and was certified Gold by the Recording Industry Association of America. Gil Green directed the music video, which features Braxton on a date at the Santa Monica Pier. Braxton further promoted "The One" through live performances, including on her Love and War Tour in 2014.

== Background and recording ==
K.E. on the Track produced "The One", which contains a sample of Mtume's "Juicy Fruit" (1983) and a portion of the Notorious B.I.G.'s "Juicy" (1994). (Note: In 2013, Tamar Braxton attributed Christian Ward and LaShawn Daniels as producers for "The One", but Love and War's liner notes and Billboard credit K.E. on the Track as the sole producer.) In a 2019 Tidal interview, K.E. recalled his apprehension about using "Juicy", explaining: “You don't know if you're disrespecting a legend. People become rightfully sensitive about certain records.” He had attempted to record alternate versions of "The One" with other artists, but he was not satisfied with the results until he approached Tamar Braxton. K.E. sent a demo of the song to Braxton and her then-husband and manager Vincent Herbert, which included instrumentation and background vocals.

Braxton co-wrote the song with LaShawn Daniels, Christian Ward, Jean-Claude Oliver, and Shaunice Lasha Jones for her second studio album Love and War (2013). (Note: Michael Donaldson, who mixed "The One", said that LaShawn Daniels was a vocal producer for the song, but this is not credited in the liner notes.) She had previously recorded music with her sisters—Toni, Traci, Towanda, and Trina—in the group the Braxtons before pursuing a solo career in 2000 with the release of her debut album Tamar, which proved unsuccessful. Braxton had more creative control with Love and War, with writing credits on nine of its fourteen tracks. After listening to the demo for "The One", Daniels, Jones, and Ward worked on the lyrics and Braxton suggested further revisions and changed small parts. James Mtume, Sean Combs, and the Notorious B.I.G. are credited as songwriters because of the samples. K.E. also received songwriting credits and performed the backing vocals for the track. (Note: The liner notes for Love and War credit K.E. on the Track as the background vocalist for "The One", although Michael Donaldson said he only used Shaunice Lasha Jones for the song's backing vocals.)

Michael Donaldson mixed the song at Studio at the Palms in Las Vegas. In an interview with Sound on Sound, Donaldson said the process was difficult; he explained that more scrutiny was placed on the song since it was seen as a potential "summertime hit record" for Braxton. According to Donaldson, a second engineer was hired to assist him, but he refused to collaborate with Donaldson and instead sent in his own mix, which was rejected. Donaldson recorded the track, and Gene Grimaldi mastered it at the Oasis Mastering recording studio in Burbank. While the song was being mastered, the name "The One" was settled on; working titles included "All I Need Is You (The One I Want)" and "All I Need Is You (The One)".

== Music and lyrics ==
A midtempo song, "The One" is two minutes and fifty-four seconds long. It is about dedication to a romantic partner, and Braxton sings with breathy vocals according to Idolator's Kathy Iandoli. The St. Louis Post-Dispatch's Kevin C. Johnson viewed the song, as well as the Love and War track "Where It Hurts", as "cool midtempo throwback jams". During a 2013 interview with The Boombox, Braxton said "The One" feels nostalgic, describing it as "one of those summertime records that are so familiar to you and you just wanna rock out because you feel like you lived it".

"The One" uses a lyric from "Juicy": "It was all a dream." A writer for BET described this as a vocal sample of the Notorious B.I.G. rapping the line, but Donaldson said it was Ward's voice pitched to sound like B.I.G. For the chorus, "You know very well who you are / You're the only one / You've got my heart / And you had a few / Boy, one too many / But I'm the only one to wake you up.", Braxton parallels the one used in "Juicy": "You know very well who you are / Don't let 'em hold you down, reach for the stars / You had a goal, but not that many / 'Cause you're the only one, I'll give you good and plenty."

== Release and promotion ==
Epic and Streamline Records released "The One" as Love and War's second single on May 7, 2013 for digital download and streaming and as a CD single. The CD also included the album's lead single "Love and War". Although Braxton wanted "Hot Sugar" to be the second single, she said that she still enjoyed "The One" and knew it was always intended to be a single at some point. "Hot Sugar" was initially scheduled as the lead single from Love and War, and Braxton was disappointed when it was switched to "Love and War". Love and War was released on September 3, 2013.

The music video for "The One" was previewed on May 30, 2013, during an episode of Braxton Family Values, a We TV reality television series about the Braxton sisters. After the episode aired, the full video was uploaded on Vevo and We TV's website; the following day, Braxton promoted it on the music television show 106 & Park in a FaceTime interview. The video was played on BET, Centric, and VH1 Soul.

Gil Green directed the music video in April 2013 at the Santa Monica Pier. Braxton was pregnant during its filming. Discussing the concept with Rap-Up, she said it was based on going out on a date in high school; she likened it to when "you go to the park and you hang out and you get all cutie, and it's just funners". Throughout the video, she spends time with her partner by dancing, playing carnival games, going on rides, and having caricatures drawn for them. Critics praised the video's atmosphere as upbeat, which Jet's Srhett believed complimented the single's "fun summer time vibe". A writer for Essence enjoyed its focus on Braxton's "fun and flirty side".

Braxton performed "The One" at an industry showcase in Los Angeles, (Note: An industry showcase is a private event in which up-and-coming singers perform for people within the music industry, such as disc jockeys, radio station managers, radio programmers, and music executives. These events are done to build interest in an artist.) accompanied by four male backup dancers. The showcase was filmed and shown on an episode of Tamar & Vince, a reality television series about Braxton's music career and her relationship with Vincent Herbert. In October 2013, Braxton reprised the song during a concert in Paris and on the talk show Big Morning Buzz Live. She performed "The One" as part of a medley for the 2013 Soul Train Music Awards, which aired on December 1, 2013. (Note: Along with "The One", the medley included Love and War singles "Love and War" and "All the Way Home".) It was the opening song for Braxton's 2014 Love and War Tour. The same year, she sang it at the Essence Music Festival in New Orleans. Braxton performed "The One" again in 2019 as the headliner for the KRNB 2nd Annual Smooth Spring Groove.

== Reception ==
"The One" received a positive response from critics. AllMusic's Andy Kellman cited the single as a highlight from Love and War; he believed that it proved Braxton was capable of having a successful music career alongside contemporary artists like Ciara, Rihanna, Trey Songz, and Keyshia Cole. In the Democrat and Chronicle, Sheila Rayam thought the song would get listeners singing and dancing. In 2019, Tidal's Yoh Phillips wrote that "The One" was "well-received", and K.E. on the Track said it had cross-generational appeal, explaining: "The young and old can be attached to it."

Reviewers praised Braxton's vocals. Kathy Iandoli said her voice complimented the song's production, adding that she "rides the beat with precision", and Billboard's Jason Lipshutz described her as "sinking into the breezy backing track and floating through the undefined sections like a ribbon in the wind". The Michigan Chronicle's rtmphayes felt that Braxton showed versatility with her vocals by releasing a more uptempo single after "Love and War". Critics positively associated "The One" with the summer, including Glamour's Phoebe Robinson who called it "breezy, easy, and catchy" and one of the top 20 songs for that summer.

The use of samples in "The One" was noted by reviewers, several of whom believed they had been overused in past songs. Sound on Sound's Paul Tingen identified "Juicy Fruit" as "one of the most sampled songs in music history". Melody Charles of SoulTracks criticized the single's use of samples as "downright lazy", and WBLK's Rodney B More disliked how many singers have referenced "Juicy Fruit". Lipshutz was less critical of the samples, and felt that the song's short length prevented it from becoming stale.

For the week of May 25, 2013, "The One" peaked at number four on Billboard's Bubbling Under Hot 100 chart; it was on the chart for 22 weeks. The single reached number 34 on the Hot R&B/Hip-Hop Songs chart for the week of June 29, 2013, and it was on the chart for 20 weeks. The track was at number 88 on the Year-End version of the latter chart. (Note: Billboard determines its Year-End charts by looking at the "aggregated numbers for each artist and title from the weekly charts"; these numbers reflect physical and digital sales, radio airplay, and streaming.) "The One" was certified Gold in 2023 by the Recording Industry Association of America, which denotes 500,000 units based on sales and streams. In South Korea, the single reached number 56 on the Circle's Digital Chart.

== Formats and track listing ==
- Audio CD
1. "The One" – 2:54
2. "Love & War" - 4:02
- Digital download
1. "The One" – 2:54

== Credits and personnel ==
Credits adapted from the liner notes of Love and War:

- Tamar Braxton – songwriting, vocals
- K.E. on the Track – songwriting, production, background vocals
- LaShawn Daniels – songwriting
- Christian Ward – songwriting
- Jean-Claude Oliver – songwriting
- Shaunice Lasha Jones – songwriting
- James Mtume – songwriting
- Sean Combs – songwriting
- Christopher Wallace – songwriting
- Michael Donaldson – mixing and recording
- Gene Grimaldi – mastering

== Charts ==
=== Weekly charts ===
Weekly chart positions for "The One"
Chart (2013)	Peak position
South Korea International (Circle)	56
US Bubbling Under Hot 100 Singles (Billboard)	4
US Hot R&B/Hip-Hop Songs (Billboard)	34

=== Year-end charts ===
Year-end chart position for "The One"
Chart (2013)	Position
US Hot R&B/Hip-Hop Songs (Billboard)	88

== Certifications ==
Certifications for "The One"
Region	Certification	Certified units/sales
United States (RIAA)	Gold	500,000‡
‡Sales+streaming figures based on certification alone.
