= Blue Streak (soundtrack) =

Blue Streak: The Album

Soundtrack album by Various Artists
- Released: August 31, 1999
- Recorded: 1999
- Genres: Hip hop; R&B
- Length: 58:13
- Label: Epic
- Producers: David McPherson (exec.); Ken Ross (exec.); Neal H. Moritz (exec.); Kenyatta Galbreth (exec.); Rodney Jerkins; Nokio; Swizz Beatz; Stevie J; Guy Roche; Brian "Lilz" Palmer; Sergio 'PLX' Moore; Jermaine Dupri; Mannie Fresh; Kenya "Fame" Miller; Gary "Gizzo" Smith; Mr. Nash; Van Bryant; Steve 'Stone' Huff; Static Major; LaShawn Daniels (co.); Keith Sweat (co.); Bryan-Michael Cox (co.); Phil Weatherspoon (co.)

Singles from Blue Streak: The Album
- 1. "Girl's Best Friend" Released: October 19, 1999; 2. "Rock Ice" Released: 1999; 3. "While You Were Gone" Released: 1999; 4. "Criminal Mind" Released: 1999; 5. "Damn (Should've Treated U Right)" Released: 1999; 6. "Please Don't Forget About Me" Released: 1999

Professional ratings
Review scores
Source	Rating
Allmusic	3/5 stars

Blue Streak: The Album is a soundtrack to the 1999 comedy film Blue Streak. It is composed of fourteen R&B and hip hop tracks from various artists and producers. The album peaked at number 31 on the Billboard 200 and number 9 and on the Top R&B/Hip-Hop Albums. Its lead single, "Girl's Best Friend" performed by Jay-Z, peaked at #52 on the Hot 100 and #19 on the Hot R&B/Hip-Hop Songs. So Plush's "Damn (Should've Treated U Right)" peaked at #41 on the Hot R&B/Hip-Hop Songs and #68 on the R&B/Hip-Hop Airplay.

== Track listing ==
No.	Title	Producer(s)	Length
1.	"Girl's Best Friend" (Jay-Z)	Swizz Beatz	4:00
2.	"Criminal Mind" (Tyrese featuring Heavy D)	Stevie J	5:04
3.	"Damn (Should've Treated U Right)" (So Plush featuring Ja Rule)	Rodney Jerkins; LaShawn Daniels (co.)	4:48
4.	"While You Were Gone" (Kelly Price)	Guy Roche	4:26
5.	"I Put You On" (Keith Sweat featuring Da Brat)	Rodney Jerkins; Keith Sweat (co.)	4:45
6.	"Blue Diamond" (Raekwon and Chip Banks)	Brian "Lilz" Palmer; Sergio 'PLX' Moore	3:40
7.	"Get Away" (TQ and Krayzie Bone)	Jermaine Dupri; Bryan-Michael Cox (co.)	3:31
8.	"Rock Ice" (Cash Money Millionaires)	Mannie Fresh	4:51
9.	"Na Na Be Like" (Foxy Brown)	Fame; Nokio	3:38
10.	"Gimme My Money" (Rehab)	Gary "Gizzo" Smith	3:37
11.	"Da Freak" (Da Shortiez and 69 Boyz)	Mr. Nash; Thrill Da Playa	4:08
12.	"Please Don't Forget About Me" (Ruff Endz)	Nokio; Phil Weatherspoon (co.); Kenya "Fame Flames" Miller	4:06
13.	"All Eyes on Me (Revisiting Cold Blooded)" (Strings and Keith Sweat)	Steve 'Stone' Huff	4:04
14.	"Playboy Like Me" (Playa)	Static Major	3:36
Total length:			58:13

== Personnel ==
- Shawn Corey Carter - performer (track 1)
- Mashonda Tifrere - performer (track 1)
- Kasseem Dean - producer (track 1)
- Ken "Duro" Ifill - mixing (track 1)
- Tyrese Darnell Gibson - performer (track 2)
- Dwight Errington Myers - performer (track 2)
- Steven Aaron Jordan - performer & producer (track 2)
- Audrey Martells - performer (track 2)
- Nicole Renée Harris - performer (track 2)
- Tony Black - mixing (track 2)
- Rhonda Roussel - performer (track 3)
- Donielle Carter - performer (track 3)
- Raquel Campbell - performer (track 3)
- T. J. Lottie - performer (track 3)
- Jeffrey Edward Atkins - performer (track 3)
- Rodney Roy Jerkins - producer & performer (track 3), producer (track 5)
- Lashawn Ameen Daniels - co-producer (track 3), performer (track 5)
- Mary Yvette Brown - performer (track 3)
- Jean-Marie Horvat - mixing (tracks: 3, 5)
- Kelly Cherelle Price - performer (track 4)
- Sue Ann Carwell - performer (track 4)
- Guy Roche - producer (track 4)
- Manny Marroquin - mixing (track 4)
- Keith Douglas Sweat - performer (tracks: 5, 13), co-producer (track 5)
- Shawntae Harris - performer (track 5)
- Corey Woods - performer (track 6)
- Bruce Lamar Mayfield - performer (track 6)
- Brian Palmer - producer (track 6)
- Sergio 'PLX' Moore - producer (track 6)
- Terrance Quaites - performer (track 7)
- Anthony Henderson - performer (track 7)
- Jermaine Dupri Mauldin - producer (track 7)
- Bryan-Michael Cox - co-producer (track 7)
- Phil Tan - mixing (track 7)
- Byron Otto Thomas - performer & producer (track 8)
- Terius Gray - performer (track 8)
- Dwayne Michael Carter Jr. - performer (track 8)
- Bryan Christopher Williams - performer (track 8)
- Christopher Noel Dorsey - performer (track 8)
- Tab Virgil Jr. - performer (track 8)
- Pat Viala - mixing (track 8)
- Inga DeCarlo Fung Marchand - performer (track 9)
- Kenya "Fame Flames" Miller - producer (track 9)
- Tamir Ruffin - producer (tracks: 9, 12), performer (track 12)
- Tony Smalios - mixing (track 9)
- Jason Brooks Buford - performer (track 10)
- Danny Alexander - performer (track 10)
- Gary "Gizzo" Smith - producer (track 10)
- Albert Van Bryant - performer & producer (track 11)
- Jamal Ali Nash - producer (track 11)
- Brett Stewart - mixing (track 11)
- Dante Jordan - performer (track 12)
- David Chance - performer (track 12)
- Rufus Waller - performer (track 12)
- Marinna Teal - performer (tracks: 12, 13)
- Phil Weatherspoon - co-producer (track 12)
- Axel Niehaus - mixing (track 12)
- Steve 'Stone' Huff - producer (track 13)
- Karl Heilbron - mixing (track 13)
- Stephen Ellis Garrett - performer & producer (track 14)
- Benjamin Bush - performer (track 14)
- Mikael Ifversen - mixing (track 14)
- David Earl McPherson II - executive producer
- Ken Ross - executive producer
- Neal H. Moritz - executive producer
- Kenyatta "Tally" Galbreth - associative executive producer
- Neil Kellerhouse - design
- David Daoud Coleman - art direction

== Singles chart positions ==
Year	Song	Chart positions		
Year	Song	Billboard Hot 100	Hot R&B/Hip-Hop Songs	R&B/Hip-Hop Airplay
1999	"Girls Best Friend"	#52	#19	-
1999	"Damn (Should've Treated U Right)"	-	#41	#68

== Certifications ==
Region	Certification	Certified units/sales
United States (RIAA)	Gold	500,000^{^}
^{^} Shipments figures based on certification alone.
