= Run Run =

Run Run may refer to:

- Run Run Shaw, Hong Kong entertainment mogul and philanthropist
- "Run Run", a song on Bluebird of Happiness (album) by Toni Braxton
- "Run Run", a song on Love & Hyperbole by Alessia Cara
