= Hot Sugar (song) =

2013 song by Tamar Braxton

Song by Tamar Braxton

from the album Love and War
- Released: September 3, 2013
- Length: 3:33
- Label: Epic; Streamline
- Songwriters: Tamar Braxton; LaShawn Daniels; Makeba Riddick; Kyle "K2" Stewart II
- Producer: Kyle "K2" Stewart II

Music video
- "Hot Sugar" on YouTube

"Hot Sugar" is a song by American singer Tamar Braxton from her second studio album, Love and War (2013). Kyle "K2" Stewart II produced the song and co-wrote it with Braxton, LaShawn Daniels, and Makeba Riddick. The lyrics focus on maintaining a relationship. Music critics variously interpreted the song as having club, dance, or hip hop influences. "Hot Sugar" was planned to be the lead single from Love and War before it was replaced by the album's title track, which performed better on radio. Some reviewers praised "Hot Sugar" for its uptempo production; others criticized it as inferior to the rest of the album, specifically the ballads.

The music video for "Hot Sugar" was directed by photographers Steven Gomillion and Dennis Leupold and features Braxton along with male dancers on Tamartiangram, a spoof of Instagram. Shortly after the video's release, Braxton said the directors had abandoned it mid-production to work on Rihanna's Diamonds World Tour. "Hot Sugar" was featured on the reality television shows Braxton Family Values and Tamar & Vince. Braxton further promoted the song through live performances, including on her Love and War Tour in 2014. The track peaked at number 15 on Billboard's Bubbling Under Hot 100 chart and number 48 on the Hot R&B/Hip-Hop Songs chart.

== Background and release ==
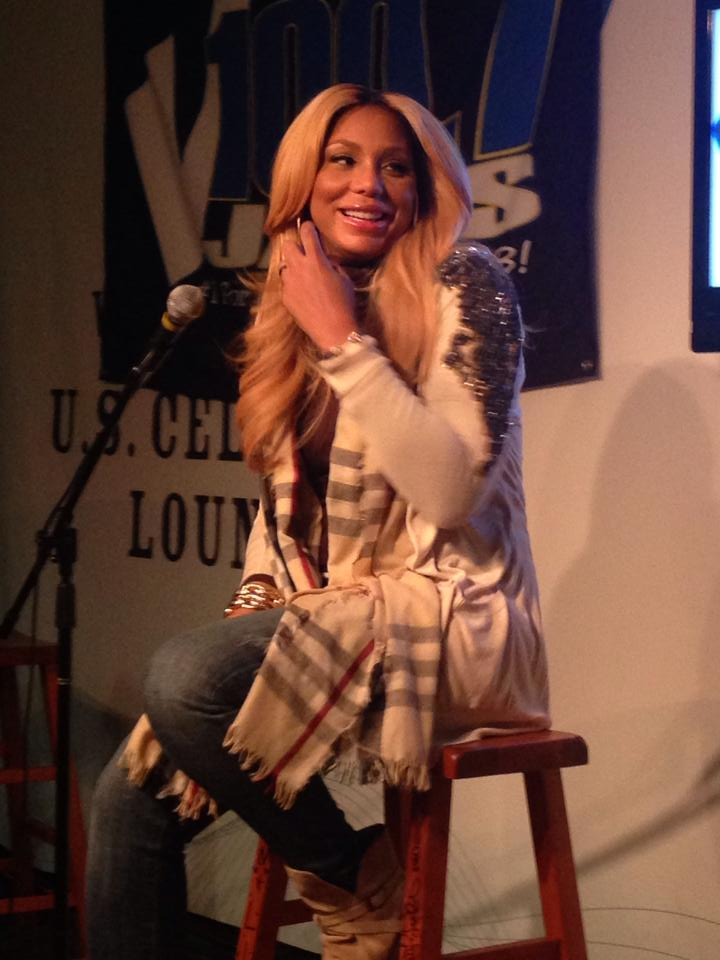
Tamar Braxton (pictured in 2013) co-wrote nine songs for Love and War, including "Hot Sugar".

After recording music with her sisters—Toni, Traci, Towanda, and Trina—in the group the Braxtons, Tamar Braxton signed with DreamWorks Records to pursue a solo career and released her debut album Tamar in 2000, which proved unsuccessful. Braxton later said she was not allowed to record music about herself or her personal life; she wished she had fought harder to make an album that was more authentic to her, viewing Tamar as a "karaoke album" and an imitation of her sister Toni. Unlike those experiences, Braxton described her second studio album Love and War (2013) as "a record that I can finally be myself and write the songs that I want to write". She has writing credits on nine of the album's fourteen tracks.

Braxton co-wrote "Hot Sugar" with LaShawn Daniels, Makeba Riddick, and Kyle "K2" Stewart II for Love and War. In a 2018 Billboard interview, Riddick said "Hot Sugar" was the first song she made for Braxton and that it was written on the same day as "Love and War". Describing the writing process with Daniels, she recounted: "We're always clowning whenever we get into the studio." Stewart produced the song, and Michael Donaldson mixed and recorded it. All the tracks on the album, including "Hot Sugar", were mastered by Gene Grimaldi.

"Hot Sugar" was to be the lead single from Love and War. On Braxton Family Values, a reality television series about the Braxton sisters, Tamar said she would be "going boom-boom-bap and making a hood rat anthem record". Her then-husband and manager Vincent Herbert instead chose to issue "Love and War" as the first single after it was received favorably on radio. (Note: After "Hot Sugar" and "Love and War" were completed, Riddick said that Herbert had "brought in some radio people to test the records on air" and that the latter received a stronger response from U.S. radio stations. With "radio testing", record labels send out a song to radio stations to measure audience reactions and gauge its potential success or issues before an official release.) Braxton was disappointed in the switch. While promoting "Love and War", she explained that it was picked because it represented the passion and struggles she felt in her marriage.

"Hot Sugar" is the eighth track on Love and War, which was released on September 3, 2013 via Epic Records and Streamline Records. Braxton had previously teased the song through snippets and live performances. According to Vibe's N. Brown, the track was a favorite among her fans. For the week of November 2, 2013, "Hot Sugar" debuted and peaked at number 15 on Billboard's Bubbling Under Hot 100 chart and number 48 on the Hot R&B/Hip-Hop Songs chart. The song appeared on each chart for one week.

== Music and lyrics ==
"Hot Sugar"
Critics identified club, dance, and hip hop as musical influences for "Hot Sugar".

An uptempo song, "Hot Sugar" is three minutes and thirty-three seconds long. Riddick thought the production incorporated "a hard, bouncy beat that we knew was gonna make the clubs go crazy". In a 2012 interview with Yahoo! Music, Braxton said she included tracks like "Hot Sugar" on Love and War to provide a balance with its ballads like "Love and War". Music critics had varying opinions on the song's genre, describing it as having influences from club, dance, and hip hop. In Rap-Up, Devin identified the song as a "ratchet club banger", and the St. Louis Post-Dispatch's Kevin C. Johnson viewed it, along with the Love and War track "She Did That", as "silly dance numbers".

"Hot Sugar" is about maintaining a relationship by pleasuring a partner, with lyrics such as "Give your man what he dreamin’ about" and a chorus in which Braxton repeats, "He want that sugar". Melody Charles for SoulTracks likened the lyrics, "Count it out, give that man what he dreams about / t-shirt and some heels on while he chase you all around the house", to "an aerobic 'sexy-back' manual for that special night in".

Discussing the lyrics, Braxton said the song was about "the love love when you’re making up"; she further explained: "It's just very important to know when it’s time to drop it like it’s hot. A lot of girls don't get that you have to have a balance." In The Washington Post, Chris Kelly cited the song as representative of the album's themes, which he identified as "age-old tales about finding and fighting for love and about relationships that require work". Kelly said Braxton expresses this through "a secret rendezvous or a serving of 'Hot Sugar'".

== Critical reception ==
Some music critics praised "Hot Sugar" for its energy. Writing for the Democrat and Chronicle, Sheila Rayam said that the track "keeps you bouncing". Melody Charles considered the album's uptempo songs "hit-and-miss", but praised "Hot Sugar" as "tart and tangy fun". When Braxton previewed three Love and War songs for Ebony, Brooke Obie responded that "Hot Sugar" was the magazine's favorite. (Note: Brooke Obie reported that Tamar Braxton and Vincent Herbert previewed three songs during a visit to Ebony: "Hot Sugar", "The One", and an unidentified gospel song.)

Other critics negatively compared "Hot Sugar" to other songs on Love and War. AllMusic's Andy Kellman dismissed the track as "mind-numbing" and inferior to the album's ballads, saying it was "no match for the fully formed songs that seem rooted in Braxton's life experiences". In an article for Yahoo! News, Shehnaz Khan felt that songs like "Hot Sugar" and "She Did That" were incongruous with the album's overall tone. Khan encouraged listeners to skip the uptempo material to focus on the ballads. Joshuah Gillin of the Tampa Bay Times found the song average and nondescript, but felt that might help it succeed as a radio single.

== Music video ==
Braxton shared previews of the music video for "Hot Sugar" on August 28, 2013, through her Instagram account. The following month, she told VH1 that it would have "a lot of fashion moments" and "a lot of life moments". The video was uploaded on October 17, 2013, to Braxton's YouTube channel, and the following day, she premiered it on the music television show 106 & Park. In the video, directed by photographers Steven Gomillion and Dennis Leupold, Braxton dances and poses on Tamartiangram, a spoof of Instagram. Braxton was accompanied by male dancers wearing heels and leather pants or kilts. In one scene, she lies down with the dancers and whips her ponytail around as they kick their legs, and in another, she assists one in doing a groin stretch.

The video received critical commentary. Essence's Derrick Bryson Taylor praised it as a "scorcher". Devin said that Braxton was "fierce and fabulous" and that she showed off her "post-baby body". In a negative review, Joshua Gillin wrote: "It's like the how-to for making the cheapest music video ever." According to ABC News Radio, the video received a mixed response on social media.

Braxton discussed the video on several platforms after its release. In a Flaunt interview, Braxton said it was the first time the vitiligo on her hands was not color-corrected and described it as a moment of self-acceptance. She described the male dancers' clothing as attracting criticism, explaining "A lot of people are close-minded. It’s okay for men to dance in kilts!"; she considered the video her way of showcasing different types of fashion. On Instagram, Braxton accused Gomillion and Leupold of abandoning the music video during its production to instead work with Rihanna for her Diamonds World Tour. (Note: Braxton has since deleted these negative comments about Steven Gomillion and Dennis Leupold from her Instagram account.) Braxton claimed that she had to hire other people to edit and complete it; she further criticized the photographers for not promoting it on their social media accounts.

== Live performances ==
Braxton's first live performance of "Hot Sugar" was during a 2012 industry showcase which was featured on Tamar & Vince, a reality television series about Braxton's music career and her relationship with Herbert. (Note: An industry showcase is a private event in which up-and-coming singers perform for people within the music industry, such as disc jockeys, radio station managers, radio programmers, and music executives. These events are done to build interest in an artist.) On July 29, 2013, she included "Hot Sugar" as the closing song for a showcase at the Emerson Theater in Los Angeles.

"Hot Sugar" was included on the set list for the Love and War Tour in 2014. Braxton twerked while performing the song, as well as for the Love and War track "One on One Fun", which she described as her favorite parts of the tour. As shown on Braxton Family Values, Tamar's sisters—Towanda, Traci, and Trina—surprised her during her performance in Atlanta by coming on stage and performing their own choreography for "Hot Sugar". When they appeared onstage, Tamar threw a water bottle at them; she described the Atlanta show as a big moment in her career and felt her sisters had ruined it for her and the audience.

Braxton sang "Hot Sugar" as part of her set as an opening act for John Legend's Made to Love Tour; while reviewing the tour, Gene Stout of The Seattle Times wrote that she performed "saucy versions" of her songs. On July 6, 2014, she reprised "Hot Sugar" at the 2014 Essence Music Festival. Braxton performed it again in 2019 as the headliner for the KRNB 2nd Annual Smooth Spring Groove.

== Credits and personnel ==
Credits adapted from the liner notes of Love and War:

- Tamar Braxton – songwriting, vocals
- LaShawn Daniels – songwriting
- Michael Donaldson – mixing and recording
- Gene Grimaldi – mastering
- Makeba Riddick – songwriting
- Kyle "K2" Stewart II – songwriting, production

== Charts ==
=== Weekly charts ===
Weekly chart positions for "Hot Sugar"
Chart (2013)	Peak position
US Bubbling Under Hot 100 Singles (Billboard)	15
US Hot R&B/Hip-Hop Songs (Billboard)	48
