= T. J. Lottie =

American singer

T. J. Lottie is an American singer. She was a member of the R&B group So Plush, which was on the label Epic Records. She is married to former NBA player Richard Hamilton. She has three children, including a 2-year-old daughter, Peyton. The couple was married in Boca Raton, Florida. Special guests included Dwyane Wade, Rasheed Wallace, Chauncey Billups, Michael Jordan, and many others. Lottie has one son with Hamilton, Richard Clay Hamilton II.

== See also ==
- Richard Hamilton
- So Plush
