= April Daniels =

American television personality

April Daniels is an American television personality. She is one of the cast members on the Tamar and Vince Show on WE TV! and founder of the Rock Out With Me campaign.

== Early life ==
April Daniels was born in Philadelphia, Pennsylvania. She is the youngest of four children and a self-proclaimed “Daddy’s girl.” Her mother a homemaker and her father a military man. After graduating from a performance high school in Philadelphia, Daniels relocated to Los Angeles, CA and obtained her cosmetology license.

== Career ==
After moving to Los Angeles, Daniels worked with a large celebrity clientele. Her clients included Lisa "Left Eye" Lopez, Multi-Grammy award-winning artist Missy Elliott, as well as NAACP Award-winning actress Tichina Arnold of Fox's hit series Martin, and Golden Globe nominated Gabrielle Union. April is now the founder of the Rock Out With Me campaign. The campaign's mission is to empower and unite women nationwide. Daniels recently partnered with Wright Productions and EBONY Magazine on a multi-city women's empowerment tour. The 2015 tour concluded in Washington D.C. at Howard University where she honored Grammy nominated artist Tamar Braxton who also stars on the Tamar and Vince Show. She is now the co-owner of Everything Girlz Love, a mobile party planning business catering to young girls.

== Personal life ==
April married the late Grammy Award-winning music executive LaShawn Daniels on June 29, 2001. Lashawn's two eldest kids were also present at their wedding. April has one son with Lashawn, Jett (born July 15, 2005). She has another son, Omarr, from a previous relationship (born February 2, 1996). Tahshon Daniels (born April 15, 1996) is April's stepson, Tahshon who is working on a music career under the name Jimmy Collins. LaShawn Daniels also co-stars on the Tamar and Vince Show along with April.
