= Damn (Should've Treated U Right) =

Single by So Plush featuring Ja Rule

from the album Blue Streak: The Album
- Released: 1999
- Genre: R&B
- Label: Epic Records
- Songwriters: Jeffrey Atkins, LaShawn Daniels, Fred Jerkins III, Rodney Jerkins, Lysette Titi
- Producer: Rodney Jerkins

Ja Rule singles chronology
"Bad Boy" (1999)	"Damn (Should've Treated U Right)" (1999)	"You Are Everything (Remix)" (1999)

"Damn (Should've Treated U Right)" is the title of a pop/R&B single by So Plush featuring Ja Rule. The single spent 18 weeks on the US R&B singles chart in 1999.

== Chart positions ==
Chart (1999)	Peak position
U.S. Billboard R&B Singles	41
U.S. Billboard R&B Single Sales	26
