= All the Way Home (Tamar Braxton song) =

Single by Tamar Braxton

from the album Love and War
- Released: August 21, 2013
- Recorded: 2013
- Genre: R&B; soul
- Length: 4:22
- Label: Epic
- Songwriters: Harvey Mason Jr.; Damon Thomas; Michael Daley; Sevyn Streeter; Steven "Lil Steve" Russell; Joelle James; Terrence Coles
- Producer: The Underdogs

Tamar Braxton singles chronology
"The One" (2013)	"All the Way Home" (2013)	"She Can Have You" (2013)

Music video
- "All the Way Home" on Youtube.com

"All the Way Home" is a song by American singer Tamar Braxton. It was released as the third single on August 21, 2013 from her second studio album Love and War (2013). Written by Harvey Mason Jr., Damon Thomas, Michael Daley, Sevyn Streeter, Joelle James, Steven "Lil Steve" Russell and produced by The Underdogs.

== Music video ==
The music video premiered on 106 & Park and on Braxton's VEVO account on December 4, 2013 with her then-husband Vincent Herbert featuring in the video.

== Commercial reception ==
"All the Way Home" debuted at number 96 on the Billboard Hot 100 chart, number 9 on Billboard R&B Streaming Songs chart, number 11 on the Heatseekers Songs chart and number 32 on Billboard Hot R&B/Hip-Hop Songs chart on December 21, 2013. "All The Way Home" peaked at number 19 on Hot R&B/Hip-Hop Airplay chart on February 8, 2014. "All The Way Home" also peaked at number 8 on Adult R&B Songs chart on February 15, 2014.

== Charts ==
Chart (2013–2014)	Peak position
US Billboard Hot 100	96
US Hot R&B/Hip-Hop Songs (Billboard)	32
US Adult R&B Songs (Billboard)	8
US Heatseekers Songs (Billboard)	11
US Hot R&B/Hip-Hop Airplay (Billboard)	19

== Certifications ==
Region	Certification	Certified units/sales
United States (RIAA)	Platinum	1,000,000^{‡}
^{‡} Sales+streaming figures based on certification alone.

== Release history ==
Country	Date	Format	Label	Ref.
Worldwide	21 August 2013	Digital download	Epic; Streamline	
