= My Man (Tamar Braxton song) =

Single by Tamar Braxton

from the album Bluebird of Happiness
- Released: April 27, 2017
- Genre: R&B; soul
- Length: 4:11; 3:47 (radio edit)
- Label: Tamartian Land; eOne Music
- Songwriters: Tamar Braxton; Cory Rooney
- Producer: Bob Robinson

Tamar Braxton singles chronology
| "Angels & Demons" (2015) | "My Man" (2017) | "Blind" (2017) |

Music video
- "My Man" on YouTube

"My Man" is an R&B and soul song recorded by American singer Tamar Braxton for her fifth studio album Bluebird of Happiness (2017). Braxton and Cory Rooney wrote the song, which was produced by Bob Robinson. It was released for digital download and streaming on April 27, 2017, as the album's lead single. "My Man" was the first single from Braxton's independent record label, Tamartian Land, created with the support of eOne Entertainment.

The song's lyrics concern infidelity and were based on Braxton's parents and their divorce after her father's affair. Braxton wrote the song from her mother's perspective on the relationship. Describing "My Man" as her most personal song, Braxton used one of her past relationships as additional inspiration.

Critics considered "My Man" as one of the highlights of Bluebird of Happiness and praised Braxton's vocals. The song peaked at No. 3 on Billboard's Adult R&B Songs chart and No. 21 on the Hot R&B Songs chart. "My Man" was featured on an episode of the reality television series Braxton Family Values. Braxton's performance at the BET Awards 2017 was praised as one of the event's highlights, although some critics believed she was lip syncing. Laurieann Gibson directed the music video, which features Braxton confronting her lover and his mistress in a hotel room.

== Background and release ==
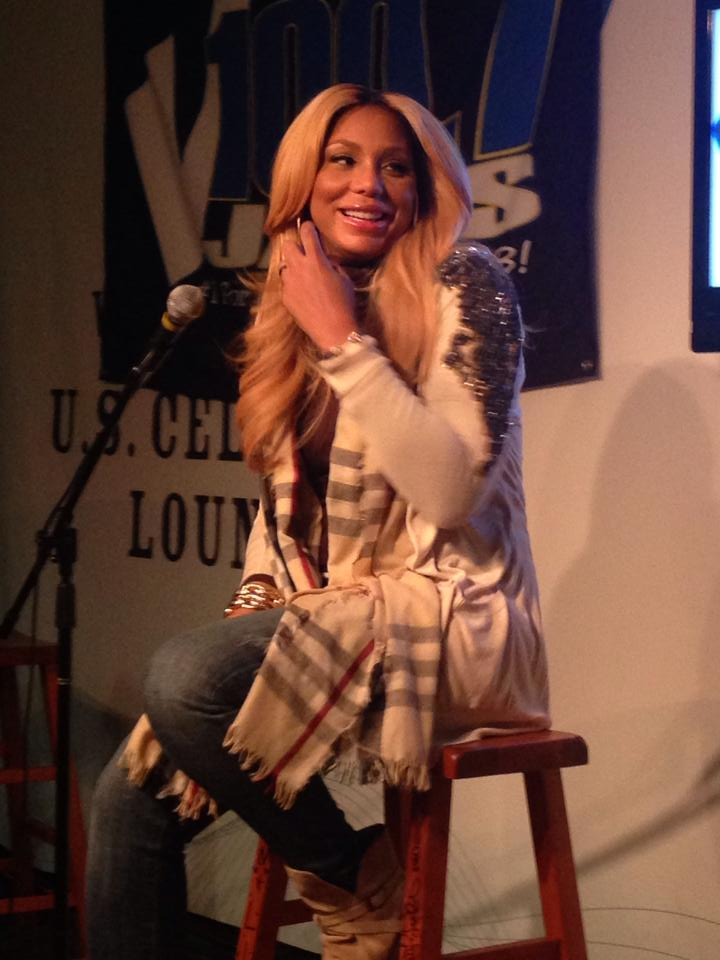
Tamar Braxton (pictured in 2013) wrote "My Man" about her parents' divorce and one of her past relationships.

Tamar Braxton co-wrote "My Man" with Cory Rooney for her fifth studio album Bluebird of Happiness (2017). The song was produced by Bob Robinson, who worked with Braxton on her eponymous debut album in 2000. Braxton based "My Man" on her parents' marriage and their divorce following her father's infidelity. While developing the lyrics, she imagined her mother's perspective to convey her emotions "as a woman and not just as [a] mom".

Additional inspiration came from one of Braxton's past relationships that caused her to question her self-worth. According to Braxton, the single was written and recorded quickly; she explained that it "just rolled out of me". She identified "My Man" as her most personal song and said the single and overall album was "the first time you see an X-ray vision of Tamar and everything I've been through". Braxton co-wrote every song on Bluebird of Happiness.

Prior to the song's release, Braxton had played it for her father, whom she told that she had forgiven for his past affair. He was initially flattered that she wrote a song about him, although he did not pay attention to the lyrics. "My Man" premiered in late April 2017 on Braxton Family Values, a reality television series about the five Braxton sisters (Toni, Traci, Towanda, Trina, and Tamar). In Entertainment Tonight, Latifah Muhammad said Braxton's frank discussion about her parents' divorce and her current relationship with them showed how the Braxton family include "some tough moments on camera for their reality show".

Braxton released "My Man" on April 27, 2017, as the album's lead single for digital download and streaming. The single was sent to urban radio stations on July 18, 2017. It was the only song on Bluebird of Happiness to be marked for explicit content. "My Man" was the first song from Braxton's independent record label, which she created in partnership with eOne Entertainment. She left Epic Records, which released three of her albums, to have more control over her career. When discussing this decision, Braxton said she was happy about not having to "sell people on things that I want to do". For the release of "My Man", Braxton named her label Tamartian Land, a reference to her fans' nickname as "Tamartians". The name changed to Logan Land for Bluebird of Happiness as a reference to her son, Logan.

== Music and lyrics ==
"My Man"
"My Man" incorporates R&B, soul, and Southern soul genres. Critics described it as a slow jam and a torch song.

"My Man" is an R&B and soul ballad, performed in the style of a slow jam and a torch song. The album version of the song lasts four minutes and eleven seconds, and a radio edit version shortens it by twenty-four seconds. In an Uproxx article, Elias Leight cited the single as an example of how R&B music uses "updates of the Southern soul sound", and in Rolling Stone, he said it "draws on a long line of fraught, theatrical soul ballads". Critics described its overall tone as sad, especially when compared to the more upbeat composition of "Pick Me Up", another track from Bluebird of Happiness.

The lyrics for "My Man" are about infidelity; Mikael Wood of the Los Angeles Times said its central message was "never trust a lonely woman with the one you love". Vibe's Da’Shan Smith described the lyrics as "suspiciously auto-biographical" for Braxton. Discussing the first verse, "Stood right by your side through everything that you went through…Why is she around", SoulTracks' Justin Kantor compared Tamar's voice to her sister Toni Braxton's "rich low alto". For the lyrics, "Is this my life? It cuts me like a knife", Kantor described Braxton as "belting grittily on the higher end of the scale".

The chorus is "I don't want to hear no bullshit stories about my man, I just can't believe that you're with her / I just can't believe she stole my man", which is the moment Rap-Up's Andres said Braxton "breaks it all down" for the listener. At one point, Braxton refers to her man's mistress as a "heifer", which critics said added more emotion to the song; the Los Angeles Times' Libby Hill viewed this moment as a highlight: "It's really the heifer aside that seals the deal in the fiery torch song about a man who done her wrong."

== Reception ==
Critics ranked "My Man" as one of the highlights of Bluebird of Happiness. AllMusic's Andy Kellman wrote that the album "crest[ed] with the two-timed belter" and its final track "Empty Boxes". In the Houston Chronicle, Joey Guerra praised "My Man", along with "Blind", "How I Feel", and "Empty Boxes", as "searing, tear-your-heart-out ballads". Arielle Chester from We TV said the lyrics were relatable, calling the song "the next best break-up remedy since ice cream". In an article about the 60th Annual Grammy Awards nominations, Da’Shan Smith said "My Man" was snubbed. Braxton's vocals were the subject of praise. Justin Kantor commended her for conveying the song's varying emotions, and Andres highlighted her ability to express the "heartache of deception" with her voice.

"My Man" peaked at number three on the Adult R&B Songs Billboard chart for the week of August 19, 2017, and stayed on the chart for 22 weeks. The song reached number 21 on the Hot R&B Songs Billboard chart for the week of August 26, 2017. According to the Houston Chronicle, the single was successful on adult R&B stations. However, Elias Leight said although songs like "My Man" are popular on R&B radio, they are never able to crossover to be played on pop radio or in feature films.

== Music video and live performance ==
The music video for "My Man" was released on June 25, 2017. Filmed in black and white by Laurieann Gibson, it depicts Braxton confronting her lover and his mistress over his infidelity. After finding her lover's hotel room, Braxton sees him in bed with another woman. She pushes the mistress to the bathroom floor before confronting him, taking back her coat, and leaving the hotel. Devin from Rap-Up believed a future music video would continue the story. The video's production was shown in a docuseries focused on Gibson's creative process.

Braxton performed "My Man" on the BET Awards 2017 accompanied by back-up dancers. She had a band, but she performed the song without a backing track. Critics praised the performance as one of the award show's highlights. Mikael Wood said that it added energy to the event, which was criticized as having technical and pacing issues. Describing Braxton as a "glorious drama queen", Elias Leight enjoyed her "series of well-honed, highly dramatic gestures"; he wrote that "the force of her stagecraft" kept the attention on her rather than the dancers. In an article for Billboard, Dan Rys praised Braxton's vocals and highlighted her mic drop as a "fitting exclamation point" to the performance.

Despite this positive response, Twitter users believed Braxton was lip syncing; Michael Arceneaux also thought this and jokingly asked why she kept "aggressively moving her wig like it was dipped in a fire ant bed before she glued it to her head". During an appearance on the game show Hip Hop Squares, Braxton had an argument with host DeRay Davis when he joked that she had lip-synced for the BET performance. Lil Mama, one of the episode's celebrity contestants, had informed Braxton about the joke since she did not hear it the first time. In an interview with the radio show The Breakfast Club, Braxton said she is close friends with Davis and that Lil Mama "needs the spirit of the hush sometimes".

== Credits and personnel ==
Credits adapted from the liner notes of Bluebird of Happiness.

- Songwriting – Tamar Braxton, Cory Rooney
- Production – Bob Robinson

== Charts ==
Weekly chart performance for "My Man"
| Chart (2017) | Peak position |
|---|---|
| US Adult R&B Songs (Billboard) | 3 |
| US Hot R&B Songs (Billboard) | 21 |

== Release history ==
Release dates and formats for "My Man"
| Region | Date | Format | Label | Ref |
|---|---|---|---|---|
| Various | April 27, 2017 | Digital download, streaming | Tamartian Land | |
| United States | July 18, 2017 | Urban radio | Tamartian Land | |
