= Girl's Best Friend =

Single by Jay-Z

from the album Blue Streak: The Album and Vol. 3... Life and Times of S. Carter
- Released: August 9, 1999
- Genre: East Coast hip hop
- Length: 4:00
- Label: Epic; Sony Music Soundtrax
- Songwriters: Shawn Carter; Kasseem Dean
- Producer: Swizz Beatz

Jay-Z singles chronology
| "Jigga My Nigga" (1999) | "Girl's Best Friend" (1999) | "Heartbreaker" (1999) |

Mashonda singles chronology
| "Gotta Man" (1998) | "Girl's Best Friend" (1999) |

"Girl's Best Friend" is a 1999 single by rapper Jay-Z that features vocals from Mashonda. It was released on August 9, 1999, as a single to promote the comedy film Blue Streak and appears on its soundtrack Blue Streak: The Album. In the same year, it appeared as a hidden track on Jay-Z's fourth album Vol. 3... Life and Times of S. Carter. Its beat, produced by Swizz Beatz, contains a sample of "Keep It Comin' Love" by KC and the Sunshine Band.

Martin Lawrence, the star of Blue Streak, makes a cameo in the music video (directed by Francis Lawrence) as his character's "Pizza Man" disguise, dancing to the song and making silly faces in the camera.

== Formats and track listings ==
- CD
1. "Girl's Best Friend (Radio Version)" (3:26)
2. "Girl's Best Friend (LP Version)" (3:59)
3. "Girl's Best Friend (Instrumental)" (4:08)
- Vinyl

A-side

  1. "Girls Best Friend"
  2. "Girls Best Friend (Radio Version)"

B-side

  1. "I Put You On"
  2. "While You Were Gone"

== Charts ==
=== Weekly charts ===
| Chart (1999) | Peak position |
|---|---|
| US Billboard Hot 100 | 52 |
| US Hot R&B/Hip-Hop Songs (Billboard) | 19 |
| US Rhythmic Airplay (Billboard) | 22 |

=== Year-end charts ===
| Chart (1999) | Position |
|---|---|
| US Hot R&B/Hip-Hop Songs (Billboard) | 80 |

== See also ==
- List of songs recorded by Jay-Z
