= Changed (Tamar Braxton song) =

Single by Tamar Braxton
- Released: March 17, 2023
- Genre: R&B
- Length: 3:15
- Label: Tamar Braxton; Platform
- Songwriters: Tamar Braxton; Amber Smith; Charles Stephens; Donald Sales; Norman Gyamfi; Nyerere Davidson
- Producers: Braxton; Chizzy; Hazel

Tamar Braxton singles chronology
"Crazy Kind of Love" (2020)	"Changed" (2023)	"Notice Me" (2024)

"Changed" is a song by American singer Tamar Braxton. It was released on March 17, 2023, by Tamar Braxton Productions/Platform Records as the first single from her upcoming sixth album. It is an R&B ballad written by Braxton, Amber Smith, Norman Gyamfi, Nyerere Davidson, and the producers Chizzy and Hazel. The song samples "Rain" by SWV.

Commercially, "Changed" reached number two on the Adult R&B Songs chart and number 17 on the R&B/Hip-Hop Airplay chart in the United States.

== Composition ==
"Changed" interpolates the melody of "Rain", a 1998 song by American R&B group SWV. The lyrics concern a romantic relationship in which the narrator reflects on her disappointment with a partner who has failed to live up to her expectations.

In a March 2023 interview with Entertainment Tonight, Braxton said the song was inspired by her experiences with relationships and searching for love. She explained that writing it allowed her to express her feelings about disappointment and uncertainty in her love life, describing the songwriting process as a form of journaling through which she could communicate her fears, hopes, and dreams.

== Promotion ==
On September 21, 2023, Tamar Braxton performed "Changed" live on The Rickey Smiley Morning Show. Braxton also promoted the song through an open-verse challenge on TikTok, inviting users to contribute to the track.

== Chart performance ==
Upon its release, "Changed" debuted at number 15 on the R&B Digital Song Sales chart. The song reached number two on the Adult R&B Songs chart, number 17 on the R&B/Hip-Hop Airplay chart and number 21 on the Hot R&B Songs chart.

== Credits and personnel ==
Credits are adapted from Tidal.

- Production – Charles "Chizzy" Stephens, Donald "Hazel" Sales
- A&R – Leonard Brooks, Norman Gyamfi
- Background vocals – Tamar Braxton, Anesha Birchett-Moody
- Co-production – Tamar Braxton
- Mastering engineering – Zachary Nichols
- Mixing engineering – Matthew Hearing
- Vocal production – Tamar Braxton, Nyerere Davidson
- Songwriting – Tamar Braxton, Amber Smith, Charles "Chizzy" Stephens, Donald "Hazel" Sales, Norman Gyamfi, Nyerere Davidson

== Charts ==
=== Weekly charts ===
Weekly chart performance for "Changed"
Chart (2023)	Peak position
US Adult R&B Songs (Billboard)	2
US R&B/Hip-Hop Airplay (Billboard)	18

=== Year-end charts ===
Year-end chart performance for "Changed"
Chart (2022)	Position
US Adult R&B Songs (Billboard)	3
