= So Plush =

American girl group

So Plush was an American R&B group composed of Rhonda Roussel, Donielle Carter, Raquel Campbell and T. J. Lottie who was signed to Epic Records in the 1990s. Their debut single "Damn (Should've Treated U Right)" featuring Ja Rule was released in 1999 reached the top 40 of the Billboard charts. Their self-titled debut album was scheduled to be released in October of 2000, but only promo and advance copies were made and the album never got a full retail release. A second single "Things I Heard Before" charted on the BET weekly countdown. The group appeared on episodes of The Parkers and The Steve Harvey Show.
