= Get None =

1999 single by Tamar Braxton

Single by Tamar featuring Jermaine Dupri and Amil

from the album Tamar
- B-side: "Don't Cry"
- Released: October 5, 1999
- Recorded: 1999
- Genre: R&B; hip-hop
- Length: 3:50
- Label: DreamWorks
- Songwriters: Mýa Harrison; Jermaine Mauldin; Amil Whitehead; Tamara Savage; Bryan-Michael Cox
- Producer: Jermaine Dupri

Tamar Braxton singles chronology
"Get None" (1999)	"If You Don't Wanna Love Me" (2000)

Jermaine Dupri singles chronology
"Going Home with Me" (1999)	"Get None" (1999)	"I've Got to Have It" (2000)

Amil singles chronology
"For My Thugs" (1999)	"Get None" (1999)	"Hello" (2000)

"Get None" is the debut single by American R&B singer Tamar Braxton (then credited mononymously as Tamar). It is the opening track on her eponymous debut studio album and was issued as the album's first single. The song features American rappers Jermaine Dupri and Amil and uncredited background vocals performed by Mýa. Mýa originally recorded her own version for her album Fear of Flying, but it didn't make it onto the album. It peaked at number 59 on the Billboard R&B chart in 1999.

== Music video ==
The official music video for the song was directed by Darren Grant and premiered on October 18, 1999.

== Track listings and formats ==
CD Single 1999

1. "Get None" (Album Version) - 3:49
2. "Get None" (Instrumental) - 3:48
3. "Get None" (A Cappella) - 3:47
4. "Don't Cry" (Non-Album Track) - 5:04

U.S. & UK Vinyl Promo 1999

1. "Get None" (Clean Version) - 3:49
2. "Get None" (LP Version) - 3:49
3. "Get None" (No Rap Version) - 3:09
4. "Get None" (Instrumental Version) - 3:48
5. "Get None" (Clean A Cappella Version) - 3:48
6. "Get None" (Dirty A Cappella Version) - 3:48

U.S. Promo CD 1999

1. "Get None" (Clean Version) - 3:49
2. "Get None" (LP Version) - 3:49
3. "Get None" (No Rap Version) - 3:09
4. "Get None" (Instrumental Version) - 3:48
5. "Get None" (Clean A Cappella Version) - 3:48

== Chart performance ==
Chart (1999)	Peak position
US Hot R&B/Hip-Hop Singles & Tracks (Billboard)	59

== Release history ==
Region	Date	Format(s)	Label(s)	Ref.
United States	October 5, 1999	Urban radio	DreamWorks	
