= Winter Loversland =

Studio album by Tamar Braxton
- Released: November 11, 2013
- Recorded: 2013
- Genre: Christmas; R&B
- Length: 31:12
- Label: Epic; Streamline

Tamar Braxton chronology
Love and War (2013)	Winter Loversland (2013)	Calling All Lovers (2015)

Singles from Winter Loversland
- 1. "She Can Have You" Released: November 9, 2013

Winter Loversland is the first Christmas album, and third studio album overall, by American singer Tamar Braxton. The album was released on November 11, 2013, by Epic Records and Streamline Records.

== Background and composition ==
Winter Loversland is a 10 track set, with 8 traditional "Sleigh Ride", "Santa Baby", "Santa Claus is Coming To Town", "Away in a Manger / Little Drummer Boy", "Merry Christmas Darling", "The Chipmunk Song (Christmas Don't Be Late", "Silent Night", "Have Yourself a Merry Little Christmas" and 2 original songs "No Gift" and "She Can Have You".

On the Target edition of "Winter Loversland", it has 2 additional bonus tracks added to the track listing, including "Santa Bring My Baby (Winter Loversland)" and "Watchin' Me (Yep, I Know It)". The song "Watchin' Me (Yep, I Know It) was originally set to be featured on Braxton's sophomore album Love and War (2013).

== Critical reaction ==
Professional ratings
Review scores
Source	Rating
AllMusic	2.5/5 stars

Huffington Post reviewed the album in an article, "hitting refresh on her R&B career in September with her new album, “Love and War,” Tamar Braxton has also released a new Christmas collection titled “Winter Loversland.” Most of the album's selections are torchy and familiar, but there's one standout example of what Braxton likes to call an “elephant-in-the-room song.” Here's Braxton on the importance of R&B truth-telling — even during the most wonderful time of the year".

AllMusic reviewed the album in an article, "Thirteen years passed between Tamar Braxton's first and second solo albums, but Winter Loversland -- released in November 2013 -- followed the latter by only a couple months. It's a brief Christmas album, only 30 minutes in length, in which Braxton covers a lot of familiar ground ("Santa Claus Is Coming to Town," "Silent Night," etc.) yet puts forth maximum effort. In some cases, the amount of energy exerted is greater than what's required—most audibly so on an a cappella update of "The Chipmunk Song (Christmas Don't Be Late)" that features Trina Braxton and dollops of melisma. "Sleigh Ride" and "Santa Claus Is Coming to Town" get traditional vocal arrangements with contemporary beats, while some songs—like "Have Yourself a Merry Little Christmas," including an undeniably stunning closing note, and a serious "Santa Baby"—are played straight. A medley of "Away in a Manger" and "Little Drummer Boy," apart from what sounds like light fingersnaps, is all vocals as well, more an impressive showcase for Braxton's talent and versatility than anything else. Braxton co-wrote the album's lone original, a ballad titled "She Can Have You." Nearly suitable for everyday listening, it's basically a breakup song with Christmas mentioned three times." They also rated the album 2.5/5 stars.

== Singles ==
The music video for "She Can Have You" was released on Braxton's VEVO account on December 4, 2013.

== Commercial performance ==
Winter Loversland debuted at number 43 on the US Billboard 200, with 8,000 copies sold in its first week. The album also charted at number eight on the US Top Holiday Albums, and number 11 on US Top R&B/Hip-Hop Albums.

== Promotion ==
Tamar Braxton was at Universal's CityWalk on December 6, 2013, performing the songs "Little Drummer Boy", "The Chipmunk Song (Christmas Don't Be Late)" (which Trina Braxton joined Braxton on stage), "Sleigh Ride", "Away in a Manger" and "Silent Night". Braxton performed "Silent Night" on The Queen Latifah Show on December 23, 2013. Braxton also performed "Silent Night" on the Daytime show, which she used to co-host The Real a year, after the release of the album on December 10, 2014.

== Track listing ==
No.	Title	Length
1.	"Sleigh Ride"	1:57
2.	"Santa Baby"	3:09
3.	"Santa Claus Is Coming to Town"	2:34
4.	"No Gift"	4:04
5.	"Away in a Manger / Little Drummer Boy"	3:45
6.	"Merry Christmas Darling"	3:38
7.	"The Chipmunk Song (Christmas Don't Be Late)" (duet with Trina Braxton)	1:12
8.	"She Can Have You"	3:39
9.	"Silent Night"	3:35
10.	"Have Yourself a Merry Little Christmas"	2:55

Target exclusive bonus tracks
No.	Title	Producer(s)	Length
11.	"Santa Bring My Baby (Winter Loversland)"	Anthony Clint Jr.	3:34
12.	"Watchin’ Me (Yep, I Know It)"	Kenneth "KT" Townsend, Stanley Randolph	3:27

== Credits and personnel ==
Performers and musicians

- Tamar Braxton - Vocals, Background
- Tiyon "TC" Mack - Vocals, Background
- Trina Braxton - Vocals (track 7)

Technical personnel

- Tamar Braxton - Composer, Producer (tracks 5, 6, 7, 8)
- Antonio "L.A." Reid Executive Producer
- Vincent Herbert - A&R, Executive Producer
- Leroy Anderson - Composer (track 1)
- Ross Bagdasarian - Composer (track 7)
- Ralph Blane - Composer (track 10)
- Richard Carpenter - Composer (track 6)
- Dernst "D'Mile" Emile - Producer (tracks 1, 3)
- Anthony Clint Jr. - Producer (tracks 2, 6, 10)
- J. Fred Coots - Composer (track 3)
- LaShawn Daniels - A&R, Composer, Producer (tracks 5, 8)
- Katherine Davis - Composer (track 5)
- Collin Desha - A&R
- Lisa Einhorn-Gilder - A&R
- Haven Gillespie - Composer (track 3)
- Dalia Glickman - A&R
- Steven Gomillion - Photography
- Gene Grimaldi - Mastering
- Franz Gruber - Composer (track 9)
- Gerald Haddon - Producer
- Joan Javits - Composer
- JP Robinson - Creative Director
- John Kercey - Engineer, Mixing
- Dennis Leupold - Photography
- Andrew Lloyd - Producer (track 8)
- Tiyon "TC" Mack - Composer, Engineer, Producer (tracks 2, 5, 6, 7, 8, 10)
- Hugh Martin - Composer (track 10)
- Joseph Mohr - Composer (track 9)
- Henry Onorati - Composer (track 5)
- Jan Ozveren - Producer
- Mitchell Parish - Composer (track 1)
- Frank Pooler - Composer (track 6)
- Public Domain - Composer
- Chad "C Note" Roper - Mixing
- Heather Santos - A&R
- Travis Sayles - Producer (track 4)
- Adonis Shropshire - Composer, Producer (track 4)
- Harry Simeone - Composer (track 5)
- Philip Springer - Composer (track 2)
- Tony Springer - Composer (track 2)
- Youngfyre - Producer (track 8)

== Charts ==
=== Weekly charts ===
Chart (2013)	Peak position
US Billboard 200	43
US Top Holiday Albums (Billboard)	8
US Top R&B/Hip-Hop Albums (Billboard)	11

=== Year-end charts ===
Chart (2014)	Position
US Top R&B/Hip-Hop Albums (Billboard)	82

== Release history ==
Region	Date	Format	Label	Ref
United States	November 11, 2013	Digital download	Epic Streamline	
United Kingdom	November 11, 2013	Digital download	Epic Streamline	
Spain	November 11, 2013	Digital download	Epic Streamline	
Australia	November 11, 2013	Digital download	Epic Streamline	
United States	November 11, 2013	CD	Epic Streamline	
United Kingdom	November 12, 2013	CD	Epic Streamline	
Germany	November 29, 2013	CD	Epic Streamline	
United States	October 27, 2014	Re-release	Epic Streamline	
