= Tamar & Vince =

American reality television series

- Genre: Reality television
- Starring: Tamar Braxton; Vincent Herbert
- Country of origin: United States
- Original language: English
- No. of seasons: 5
- No. of episodes: 44

Production
- Executive producers: Tamar Braxton; Vincent Herbert; Toni Braxton; Annabelle McDonald; Dan Cutforth; Jane Lipsitz; Kate Farrell; Lauren Gellert; Richard Courtney
- Camera setup: Multiple
- Running time: 40–43 minutes
- Production company: Magical Elves Productions

Original release
- Network: WE tv
- Release: September 20, 2012 – December 28, 2017

Related
- Braxton Family Values

Tamar & Vince is an American reality television series that debuted on September 20, 2012, and airs on WE tv. It is a spin-off of Braxton Family Values. In June 2013, Tamar & Vince was renewed for a ten-episode second season that premiered on September 5, 2013. The first season acquired 5.6 million total viewers for the network. The third season premiered on October 23, 2014, and consists of eight episodes. The fourth season premiered on December 10, 2015. The show's fifth and final season premiered on November 9, 2017.

== Premise ==
The first season follows Tamar Braxton through her journey to superstardom, and also features the struggles she and Vince encounter in their marriage. The second season encompasses the creation of Tamar's new album, Love and War, the promotional tour for the album, Tamar's pregnancy and the arrival of the couple's first child. The fourth season chronicled Tamar's health struggles with pulmonary embolisms. The fifth season chronicled Tamar and Vince as they reach a breaking point in their career and marriage and as Tamar encompasses the creation of her fifth studio album Bluebird of Happiness and Vince is on a quest to reclaim his own life and his health by risking his own life having skin removal surgery. The show's theme song, "You're My Monday & My Friday", was performed by Tamar and Vince.

== Episodes ==
=== Series overview ===
Season	Episodes	Originally released	
Season	Episodes	First released	Last released
1	10	September 20, 2012	December 6, 2012
2	10	September 5, 2013	November 7, 2013
3	8	October 23, 2014	December 18, 2014
4	10	December 10, 2015	February 25, 2016
5	7	November 9, 2017	December 28, 2017

=== Season 1 (2012) ===
No. overall	No. in season	Title	Original release date	US viewers (millions)
1	1	"Meet the Herberts"	September 20, 2012	0.91
Tamar and her husband Vince take on career and family; Tamar checks on her progress in the recording studio.
2	2	"Calling All Tamartians!"	September 27, 2012	0.70
Tamar records her solo album and clashes with Vince; Vince's health and Tamar's career are threatened; 2012 ESSENCE Music Festival.
3	3	"Nurse Ratchet"	October 4, 2012	N/A
Vince has another health scare; Tamar puts recording on a pause; Tamar and Vince's marriage is at risk.
4	4	"Trouble in Paradise"	October 11, 2012	1.53
Tamar and Vince go on a lovers' retreat in Hawaii with LaShawn and April; a major blowup occurs between Tamar and Vince.
5	5	"Clash of the Herberts"	October 18, 2012	0.66
Tamar and Vince's marriage is in jeopardy; an emergency counselling session; Tamar clashes with her stylist.
6	6	"Road to Recovery"	November 1, 2012	N/A
Tamar and Vince meet with an interior designer; Vince's health is at stake; Tamar's album in L.A.; Vince visits his parents' graves.
7	7	"Gaga for Gaga"	November 8, 2012	N/A
Tamar performs the National Anthem at a football game; Vince and Tamar head to London for some business and fun.
8	8	"Model Wife"	November 15, 2012	N/A
Papa Braxton gives marital advice; LaShawn and April argue; Tamar struggles on a new ballad and hits the catwalk for the first time.
9	9	"The Showcase Must Go On!"	November 29, 2012	N/A
Tamar prepares for the release of her new single between workouts, photo shoots, and fights with her vocal coach.
10	10	"Are You Ready for Tamar?!?"	December 6, 2012	N/A
Tamar auditions hot male dancers; Tamar and Vince go to Vegas; Tamar takes the stage with debut songs.

=== Season 2 (2013) ===
No. overall	No. in season	Title	Original release date	US viewers (millions)
11	1	"It's a Herbert"	September 5, 2013	0.92
Tamar and Vince reveal the gender of their baby. They're shocked when Tamar's father refuses to come stay with them after the baby is born. On Tamar's promotional tour, she stresses about hiding her pregnancy.
12	2	"Bump on the Road"	September 12, 2013	0.72
As Tamar dazzles her fans on second leg of her tour, she battles pregnancy issues and argues with Vince over her next single. They finally make their baby announcement, then rush home to move into a bigger house.
13	3	"Posh & Pregnant"	September 19, 2013	0.97
Tamar and Vince design their new house. Tamar is challenged to downsize her shoe collection. They get parenting tips from LaShawn and April and go to a childbirth class. Tamar gets special dress for award show.
14	4	"For the Record"	September 26, 2013	0.81
Tamar and Vince go to NYC to promote her album, and Tamar reveals her growing belly at a pregnancy photo shoot. Terrell directs Tamar for a video greeting for RuPaul's Drag Race. Tamar and Vince search for a nanny.
15	5	"What to Expect When You're Poppin'"	October 3, 2013	0.78
Vince wants Tamar to shoot her next music video while still pregnant; Tamar is bummed out by the wardrobe options for the shoot. Her sisters and mom help with a belly cast. Tamar & Vince take their last birth class.
16	6	"Labor Of Love"	October 10, 2013	0.79
Trina and Traci embarrass Tamar at her star-studded baby shower. The mood is tense while Tamar and Vince shoot family photos with Miracle. Tamar goes into labour stressed out and has complications right away. Guest Stars: Trina and Traci Braxton.
17	7	"Baby Herbert Arrives"	October 17, 2013	1.03
Tamar has a difficult labour, and she and Vince must make a tough decision. Tamar finally gives birth to a baby boy, and the Braxton clan debates names. The couple fight while driving home from the hospital. Guest Stars: Trina Braxton, Traci Braxton, Toni Braxton, Towanda Braxton, Evelyn Braxton, Michael Conrad Braxton
18	8	"Jet Set Baby"	October 24, 2013	0.98
Tamar and Vince return to Los Angeles and experience highs and lows of new parenthood; Baby has first photo shoot; Tamar can't fit into the outfits for her album cover photo; she questions the direction for her album.
19	9	"Mama Works Hard for Her Coin"	October 31, 2013	0.87
Tamar struggles to balance motherhood and career; Tamar's new talk show, magazine cover shoot and final decision for the album.
20	10	"Welcome To The #1 Club"	November 7, 2013	0.91
Tamar's new album is released and she celebrates with an exclusive bash. Tamar and Vince clash over Tamar's success.

=== Season 3 (2014) ===
No. overall	No. in season	Title	Original release date	US viewers (millions)
21	1	"Tour De Tamar"	October 23, 2014	0.686
Tamar's career goes into overdrive; Vince and Tamar hit the road.
22	2	"Superdome Superstar"	October 30, 2014	0.627
Tamar's solo tour and biggest show yet at New Orleans Superdome; Tamar and Vince have a blowup.
23	3	"Crazy for Cabo"	November 6, 2014	0.73
Tamar uses social media against Vince's wishes; Terrell and his partner's relationship.
24	4	"A Ruff Surprise"	November 13, 2014	0.665
Vince surprises Tamar with a new dog for Logan; Tamar works on her talk show, The Real.
25	5	"Viva La Video!"	November 20, 2014	0.731
Tamar and Vince have a standoff; struggle to shoot the music video; LaShawn's stand-up.
26	6	"Tamar's Work Is Never Done"	December 4, 2014	0.652
Tamar's talk show is shut down by an accident on location; Tamar's single release and music video.
27	7	"Lies You Tell!"	December 11, 2014	0.793
Tamar undergoes a lie detector test at The Real, which causes some avoided topics to come up.
28	8	"Gone Fishin'"	December 18, 2014	0.761
Tamar, Vince and friends go on a mountain retreat.

=== Season 4 (2015–16) ===
No. overall	No. in season	Title	Original release date	US viewers (millions)
29	1	"The Herbert Hustle"	December 10, 2015	0.790
In the Season 4 premiere, Tamar prepares to release her next album while taping the new season of The Real. Later, Tamar worries about balancing her work after Vince reveals that she'll be competing on Dancing with the Stars.
30	2	"Double-Booked to Capacity"	December 17, 2015	0.684
Tamar hits the road to promote her new album then heads to D.C. for an event with April. Later, Tamar plans her new music video and performs a dance inspired by a time when Vince was gravely ill.
31	3	"It's a Jungle Out Here"	January 7, 2016	0.698
Tamar travels to the Caribbean to shoot her music video and worries that she'll lose rehearsal time with her new dance partner. Later, Toni gives Tamar advice about Dancing with the Stars and a disconcerting text on Vince's phone.
32	4	"Catfish"	January 14, 2016	0.582
Vince signs new female artists without telling Tamar; Tamar becomes annoyed that Vince is texting with his artist. Tamar shoots a music video with her friends in her backyard. Later, Logan walks in a fashion show on The Real.
33	5	"You Was Flat, Dawg"	January 21, 2016	0.665
Tamar is stressed about her upcoming tour because of the background singers and her voice. Later, Vince takes Tamar's place on The Real while she's sick.
34	6	"Dying to Dance"	January 28, 2016	0.483
Tamar worries about losing her voice during her Orlando performance and learning her dance for Dancing with the Stars. Later, Tamar ends up in the hospital after overworking herself.
35	7	"A Rib to Spare"	February 4, 2016	0.591
Tamar is nervous about her upcoming surgery to remove her rib; Vince stresses to Tamar it's important to slow down. Later, Toni gives Tamar some health advice.
36	8	"Sisters Know Best"	February 11, 2016	0.522
Tamar's sisters come in town for a surprise visit; Evelyn expresses her concern for Tamar returning to work early; and Tamar has a mommy-son date with Logan.
37	9	"Notorious P.I.G."	February 18, 2016	0.562
Tamar is worried about traveling by plane after her health scare; Tamar spends time with Traci in Washington, D.C.; and Evelyn reveals she was rushed to the hospital.
38	10	"If I Don't Have You"	February 25, 2016	0.622
Tamar and Vince disagree about whether to buy a house in Atlanta; Logan gets a pig; James Wright Chanel judges a pie bake-off between Tamar and Vince; and Vince goes to the hospital.

=== Season 5 (2017) ===
No. overall	No. in season	Title	Original release date	US viewers (millions)
39	1	"Love and War"	November 9, 2017	0.758
Tamar confronts Vince when her performance goes wrong; the strain of career and home begins to show cracks in their marriage; Vince considers risky surgery, but Tamar fears for his life.
40	2	"Becky With the Good Hair"	November 16, 2017	0.631
After an explosive fight with Vince, Tamar plans a trip to Cabo to ease the tension, but they soon learn they can't leave their problems behind; Vince storms out of dinner, and Tamar is left feeling lonely.
41	3	"Scattered, Smothered and Covered"	November 30, 2017	0.593
Vince lashes out after Tamar expresses a need for space, and the Mexico trip comes to an explosive end; the non-stop clashes prompt Tamar to make a painful decision; Tamar and Vince face off on the night of the concert.
42	4	"Love Under New Management"	December 7, 2017	0.697
Tamar and Vince struggle to reconcile before the show in Washington, D.C., and Tamar makes a heartbreaking decision; a painful truth is exposed during a dinner party.
43	5	"Hard to Manage"	December 14, 2017	0.707
Tamar struggles to keep her marriage on good terms, Vince reveals his true feelings about working with Tamar and Tamar's father gives her tough love after months of no communication.
44	6	"Last Effort for Peace"	December 21, 2017	0.728
Tamar and Vince have a big blowout in Atlanta, prompting Tamar to hatch a secret plan; Tamar reunites with her friend, Tiny, after a very public feud and reveals major news; Tamar gets a telephone call that changes everything.
45	7	"Bluebird Flies"	December 28, 2017	0.798
Tamar puts her secret plan to move out on hold following Vince's car accident; Tamar and Vince release her new album together, but Tamar decides to move out and file for divorce.
