= LaShawn Daniels =

American musical artist (1977–2019)

- Birth name: LaShawn Ameen Daniels
- Born: December 28, 1977 Newark, New Jersey, U.S.
- Died: September 3, 2019 (aged 41) Catawba, South Carolina, U.S.
- Genres: R&B; pop; soul; hip hop soul; urban contemporary
- Occupations: Singer; songwriter; vocal producer; arranger
- Instrument: Vocals
- Years active: 1997–2019

LaShawn Ameen Daniels (December 28, 1977 – September 3, 2019) was an American songwriter, vocal producer and arranger. Often in tandem with producer Rodney Jerkins, he is known for his songwriting work for R&B singers such as Brandy, Beyoncé, Michael Jackson, Tamar Braxton, Toni Braxton, Jennifer Lopez, Ciara, and Whitney Houston, among others. Daniels won a Grammy Award—from nine nominations—for his work on Destiny's Child's 1999 single "Say My Name", which peaked atop the Billboard Hot 100.

== Early life ==
Daniels was born in Newark, New Jersey, United States.

== Personal life ==
Daniels married April in 2001 and together had three sons.

== Career ==
Daniels won a Grammy Award for Best R&B Song in 2001 for his songwriting work on "Say My Name" by Destiny's Child, and was nominated in the same category in 2014 for "Love and War" performed by Tamar Braxton.

== Death ==
Daniels died on September 3, 2019, at the age of 41, following a car crash in Catawba, South Carolina.

== Songwriting credits ==
Daniels' songs were usually co-written in collaboration with producer Rodney "Darkchild" Jerkins. These include:

- Brandy – "Top of the World" (1998)
- Brandy and Monica – "The Boy Is Mine" (1998)
- Whitney Houston – "It's Not Right but It's Okay" (1999)
- Brandy – "Angel in Disguise" (1999)
- Jennifer Lopez – "If You Had My Love" (1999)
- So Plush featuring Ja Rule – "Damn (Should've Treated U Right)" (1999)
- Destiny's Child – "Say My Name" (1999)
- Brandy – "Never Say Never" (2000)
- Whitney Houston and George Michael – "If I Told You That" (2000)
- Melanie B – "Tell Me" (2000)
- Spice Girls – "Holler" (2000)
- Spice Girls – "Let Love Lead the Way" (2000)
- Toni Braxton – "He Wasn't Man Enough" (2000)
- Michael Jackson – "You Rock My World" (2001)
- Michael Jackson – "Privacy" (2001)
- Michael Jackson – "Heartbreaker" (2001)
- Michael Jackson – "Invincible" (2001)
- Michael Jackson – "Unbreakable (feat. The Notorious B.I.G.)" (2001)
- Michael Jackson – "Threatened (feat. Rod Serling)" (2001)
- Monica – "All Eyez on Me" (2002)
- Brandy – "What About Us? (2002)
- Mary Mary - "He Said" (2002)
- Blaque – "I'm Good" (2004)
- Destiny's Child – "Lose My Breath" (2004)
- Ray J – "One Wish" (2005)
- Ray J – "What I Need" (2006)
- Virtue - “Give Him The Praises” (2006)
- Kierra Sheard – "Why Me?" (2006)
- Ciara featuring 50 Cent – "Can't Leave 'em Alone" (2007)
- Janet Jackson – "Feedback" (2007)
- Natasha Bedingfield – "Angel" (2008)
- Joe – "E.R. (Emergency Room)" (2008)
- Janet Jackson – "Luv" (2008)
- Lady Gaga and Beyoncé – "Telephone" (2010)
- Tamar Braxton – "Love and War" (2012)
- Tamar Braxton – "The One" (2013)
- Tamar Braxton – "Hot Sugar" (2013)
- Michael Jackson – "Xscape" (2014)
- Tamar Braxton – "If I Don't Have You" (2015)
- Erica Campbell - "I Luh God" (2015)
- Brandy - "Borderline" (2020)
