= Bluebird of Happiness (album) =

Studio album by Tamar Braxton
- Released: September 29, 2017
- Recorded: 2016–2017
- Genre: R&B
- Length: 40:53
- Labels: LoganLand; Entertainment One

Tamar Braxton chronology
Calling All Lovers (2015)	Bluebird of Happiness (2017)	Heartbreak Retrograde (2025)

Singles from Bluebird of Happiness
- 1. "My Man" Released: April 27, 2017; 2. "Blind" Released: September 22, 2017

Bluebird of Happiness is the fifth studio album by the American R&B singer Tamar Braxton, released on September 29, 2017, by LoganLand Records and Entertainment One. The album was preceded by the release of two singles: "My Man" followed by "Blind".

== Background and release ==
"My best work to date. My new album. Bluebird of Happiness. I know I keep saying coming soon. But I promise you I can not wait to share this project with you. Pre-Order and official release date will be revealed before you know it. Until then buckle up and get ready to fly."

— Braxton talking about her fifth studio album.

On January 17, 2017, Braxton said during an interview with Hollywood Today regarding her upcoming fifth studio album "this album for me is so personal and so amazing and I get to work with Rodney Jerkins". On April 27, 2017, "My Man" was released as the lead single from the album. The song was also introduced on an episode of Braxton Family Values in which Braxton stars. On September 6, 2017, Braxton announced on her social media the title of the album along with the cover art. She said, "Pre-order and official release date will be revealed before you know it." On September 8, 2017, the track listing and release date for the album were revealed. On September 14, 2017, Braxton announced that Bluebird of Happiness would be her final studio album. However, as of 2020, Braxton has since stated that she will record a sixth studio album, as she found her love for music again.

== Promotion ==
"My Man" was released as the album's lead single on April 27, 2017. The song peaked at number 3 on the Adult R&B Songs chart, number 21 on the Hot R&B Songs chart and number 19 on the Hot R&B/Hip-Hop Airplay chart. The music video was released on June 25, 2017. "Pick Me Up" was released as a promotional single.

"Blind" was released as the album's second single on September 22, 2017. It peaked at number 29 on the Adult R&B Songs chart.

On November 23, 2018, one year after the release, she released the music video of "The Makings of You" and on November 26, 2018, she released the music video of "Wanna Love You Boy". However, neither song are available as an official single on iTunes or Amazon.

== Commercial performance ==
The album debuted at number 14 on the US Billboard 200 and number 1 on the Independent Albums chart with 24,000 album-equivalent units.

== Track listing ==
Bluebird of Happiness track listing
No.	Title	Writer(s)	Producer(s)	Length
1.	"My Forever"	Tamar Braxton; Tiyon "TC" Mack; Shinique Owens	The Co-Captains; Jevon Hill; Jovan J. Dawkins; Tiyon "TC" Mack	3:31
2.	"Wanna Love You Boy"	Braxton; Eric Bellinger; Robin Thicke; Pharrell Williams	Yonni	2:52
3.	"Run Run"	Braxton; Makeba Riddick Woods; Troy Taylor; Winston Delano Riley	Taylor; Bridgetown	2:40
4.	"Hol' Up" (featuring Yo Gotti)	Braxton; Mack; Hi Jackson; O'Kelly Isley; Ronald Isley; Rudolph Isley	Donald "HAZEL" Sales; Mack	3:59
5.	"The Makings of You"	Braxton; Rodney "Darkchild" Jerkins; Jared Thorne; Anesha Birchett; Antea Birchett; Curtis Mayfield	Jerkins; ReezyTunez	5:02
6.	"Heart in My Hands"	Braxton; Jerkins; Priscilla Renea	Jerkins	3:15
7.	"Blind"	Braxton; Jenkins; Vincent Berry II; Carmen Reecey; Billy Foster; Ellington Jordan	Jerkins	5:01
8.	"My Man"	Braxton; Cory Rooney	Bob Robinson	4:11
9.	"Pick Me Up"	Braxton; Woods; Taylor; Michael Jones	Taylor; $K	2:46
10.	"How I Feel"	Braxton; Berry II; Mike Jimenez; Malcolm Harvest	Damon Thomas; Berry II	3:46
11.	"Empty Boxes"	Braxton; Berry II; LaShawn Daniels; LaJoel Augustin; Don Corleone; Joshua Berry; Rob Ingouma; Jean-Guy Leconte	Berry II	3:49
Total length:				40:53

Sample credits

- "Wanna Love You Boy" contains an interpolation of Robin Thicke's "Wanna Love You Girl".
- "Run Run" contains elements of Sister Nancy's "Bam Bam".
- "Hol' Up" contains an interpolation of the Isley Brothers's "Shout".
- "The Makings of You" contains an interpolation of Gladys Knight & the Pips's cover of the song of the same name, which was originally recorded by Curtis Mayfield.
- "Blind" contains an interpolation of Etta James's "I'd Rather Go Blind".
- "Pick Me Up" contains an interpolation of Evelyn "Champagne" King's "Love Come Down".

== Charts ==
Chart performance for Bluebird of Happiness
Chart (2017)	Peak position
US Billboard 200	14
US Top R&B/Hip-Hop Albums (Billboard)	8
US Independent Albums (Billboard)	1

== Release history ==
Release history and formats for Bluebird of Happiness
Region	Date	Format	Label	Ref
United States United Kingdom	September 29, 2017	Digital download; CD	LoganLand; eOne	
