= Love and War (Tamar Braxton album) =

Studio album by Tamar Braxton
- Released: September 3, 2013
- Recorded: 2011–2013
- Genre: R&B
- Length: 48:17
- Labels: Epic; Streamline
- Producers: Vincent Herbert (exec.); L.A. Reid (exec.); Angela Hunte; C. "Tricky" Stewart; Brandon Sewell; Bryan-Michael Cox; Da Internz; Diplo; D'Mile; DJ Camper; Eric Mobley; Kuk Harrell; Michael Daley; Patrick "j.Que" Smith; K.E. on the Track; Kyle "K2" Stewart II; Kendrick A.J. Dean; Rico Beats; SCMG; Tamar Braxton; Tiyon "TC" Mack; Troy Oliver; The Underdogs; Young Fyre

Tamar Braxton chronology
| Tamar (2000) | Love and War (2013) | Winter Loversland (2013) |

Singles from Love and War
- 1. "Love and War" Released: December 6, 2012; 2. "The One" Released: May 7, 2013; 3. "All the Way Home" Released: August 21, 2013

Love and War is the second studio album by American singer Tamar Braxton. The album was released on September 3, 2013, by Epic Records and Streamline Records. It is Tamar Braxton’s first studio album in 13 years. The album was a success, debuting at number two on the US Billboard 200 chart selling 114,000 copies. Even though plans for a re-release of the album with a full version of the song "She Did That" and a rap remix of "One on One Fun" in 2014 with additional songs were announced, the idea was eventually scrapped as Love and War was never re-published.

== Singles ==
The album's title track "Love and War" was released on December 6, 2012 as the lead single from the album. On January 17, 2013, the music video was released for "Love and War". "Love and War" officially impacted US Rhythmic radio on March 26, 2013.

On May 7, 2013, the second single "The One" was released. On May 30, 2013, the music video was released for "The One".

"All The Way Home" was sent to Urban Mainstream radio on August 21, 2013 as the third single from the album. The music video for "All The Way Home" was released on December 4, 2013.

On October 17, 2013, a music video was released for "Hot Sugar".

On November 29, 2018 five years after the album release, a music video for "Pieces" was released.

== Commercial performance ==
I feel like it was only a couple thousands between us, and really, honestly she has like 10 million followers, I have like 800.000 followers and that speaks volumes, my audience is not as big as Ariana's [...] I feel like the attention that Love and War has gotten so far, was the right attention [...] and no one is looking at the charts, after that my album outsold her for three weeks

— Tamar Braxton talking to MalcolmMusic about the commercial performance of Love and War

The album debuted at number two on the US Billboard 200 chart, with first-week sales of 114,000. The album almost made number one but was beaten by Ariana Grande's Yours Truly, which sold 138,000 in its first week. Love and War also debuted at number two in digital sales, selling 51,000 copies, being beaten by Yours Truly once again. However, the album sold well physically, selling 63,000 and debuted at number one in physical sales (Yours Truly only sold 30,000 physically and debuted at number seven). In its second week, the album sold 35,000 more copies. In its third week, the album sold 20,000 more copies. In its fourth week, the album sold 14,000 more copies bringing its total album sales to 183,000. The album helped Braxton set the female record for longest time between an initial chart listing and a first number one on the US Top R&B/Hip-Hop Albums chart during the SoundScan era (from December 1992 to 2013). The record was previously held by Angie Stone, who waited eight years and two weeks (from 1999 to 2007). The album has sold 428,000 copies in the U.S. to date.

== Critical response ==
Professional ratings
Review scores
| Source | Rating |
|---|---|
| Artistdirect | 5/5 stars |
| AllMusic | 3/5 stars |

Love and War was met with generally positive reviews from music critics. Andy Kellman of AllMusic gave the album three out of five stars, saying "Indeed, Love and War plays out like it's designed to contend with the likes of Ciara, Rihanna, Trey Songz, and maybe even Keyshia Cole, rather than those who came up around the same time as Braxton. Slower, more atmospheric productions like 'Stay and Fight,' 'All the Way Home,' and 'Sound of Love' suit her the best and display her considerable skill – by now, given some of the artists who have come and gone since 2000, she should have at least four albums in her past. The lighthearted numbers – like the Keri Hilson castoff-level 'Tip Toe,' the mind-numbing 'Hot Sugar,' and the Mike Will knockoff strip-club track 'She Did That' – are no match for the fully formed songs that seem rooted in Braxton's life experiences." Kathy Iandoli of Vibe gave the album a positive review, saying "Love And War is at times all over the place, but that's perfectly fine. The project is beautifully crazy—exactly what we've come to know and love from Tamar Braxton. It took a dose of reality TV to bring us to Tamar's musical reality. Now everyone is tuned in." Rick Florino of Artistdirect gave the album five out of five stars, saying "If there's one thing that you'll take away from Tamar Braxton's triumphant Love and War, it's that this girl can sing like few can. Like all classic R&B records, it's Tamar's marvelous voice that resounds the loudest throughout—and long after it's over. It's like she's been the music industry's best kept secret for all of these years, and she's finally getting the attention she deserves. It's definitely her time."

== Track listing ==
| No. | Title | Writer(s) | Producer(s) | Length |
|---|---|---|---|---|
| 1. | "The One" | Tamar Braxton; Christian "Yung Berg" Ward; Shaunice Lasha Jones; LaShawn Daniels; James Mtume; Sean Combs; Jean-Claude Oliver; Christopher Wallace; Kevin Erondu | K.E. on the Track; LaShawn Daniels; Yung Berg | 2:53 |
| 2. | "Tip Toe" | Braxton; Daniels; Marcos Palacios; Ernest Clark; Priscilla Renea; Ericka J. Coulter | Da Internz | 2:57 |
| 3. | "Stay and Fight" | Christopher Stewart; Lindsay "Mavelle" Gilbert; Sergio "Reverse" Van Gonter | Sergio "Reverse" Van Gonter; C. "Tricky" Stewart; Kuk Harrell^{[a]}; Tamar Braxton^{[a]} | 4:00 |
| 4. | "Love and War" | Braxton; Darhyl Camper, Jr.; Daniels; Makeba Riddick | DJ Camper | 4:02 |
| 5. | "All the Way Home" | Harvey Mason Jr.; Damon Thomas; Michael Daley; Terrence Coles; Joelle James; Amber "Sevyn" Streeter; Steven "Lil Steve" Russell | The Underdogs; Michael Daley^{[b]} | 4:22 |
| 6. | "One on One Fun" | Braxton; Daniels; Angela Hunte; Thomas Wesley Pentz | Diplo; Angela Hunte | 1:56 |
| 7. | "She Did That" | Palacios; Clark; Daniels; Riddick | Da Internz | 1:17 |
| 8. | "Hot Sugar" | Braxton; Kyle Stewart II; Daniels; Christopher “Chris” Brown; Riddick | Kyle "K2" Stewart II | 3:33 |
| 9. | "Pieces" | Bryan-Michael Paul Cox; Kendrick A.J. Dean; Streeter; Anthony Franks; Brandon Sewell; Ashley Rose Collier; Michael "M. Bass" Elemba; Jasper Murray; Delante Murphy; Quentin Deberry | Bryan-Michael Cox; Kendrick Dean; Brandon "Tec Beatz" Sewell | 3:39 |
| 10. | "Where It Hurts" | Braxton; Cox; Patrick "j.Que" Smith; Kenneth "Babyface" Edmonds; Daniels | Cox; Patrick "J. Que" Smith | 3:45 |
| 11. | "Prettiest Girl" | Braxton; Tiyon "TC" Mack; Troy Oliver | Troy Oliver; Tiyon "TC" Mack | 4:10 |
| 12. | "Sound of Love" | Braxton; Ricardo "Rico Beats" Lamarre; Mack | Rico Beats | 4:07 |
| 13. | "White Candle" | Braxton; Mack; Eric Mobley; Ursula Yancy | Eric Mobley; Mack^{[a]} | 4:16 |
| 14. | "Thank You Lord" | Tramaine Winfrey; Mack | Young Fyre | 3:20 |
| Total length: | | | | 48:17 |

Best Buy bonus track
| No. | Title | Writer(s) | Producer(s) | Length |
|---|---|---|---|---|
| 15. | "Black Tears" | Braxton; Mack | D'Mile | 4:09 |
| Total length: | | | | 52:26 |

Notes

- ^{^[a]} signifies a vocal producer
- ^{^[b]} signifies a co-producer

Sampling credits

- "The One" contains a sample from "Juicy Fruit", written by James Mtume, as performed by Mtume as well as a portion of the composition "Juicy", written by Sean Combs, James Mtume, Jean Claude Oliver, and Christopher Wallace.

== Charts ==
=== Weekly charts ===
| Chart (2013) | Peak position |
|---|---|
| UK R&B Albums Chart | 34 |
| US Billboard 200 | 2 |
| US Top R&B/Hip-Hop Albums (Billboard) | 1 |

=== Year-end charts ===
| Chart (2013) | Position |
|---|---|
| US Billboard 200 | 110 |
| US Top R&B/Hip-Hop Albums (Billboard) | 25 |

| Chart (2014) | Position |
|---|---|
| US Billboard 200 | 150 |
| US Top R&B/Hip-Hop Albums (Billboard) | 28 |
