= Tamar (album) =

Studio album by Tamar Braxton
- Released: March 21, 2000
- Recorded: 1999
- Length: 60:37
- Label: DreamWorks; RedZone
- Producer: Tim & Bob; Shane August; Jermaine Dupri; Missy Elliott; Christopher "Tricky" Stewart; Darrell "Delite" Allamby

Tamar Braxton chronology
Tamar (2000)	Love and War (2013)

Singles from Tamar
- 1. "Get None" Released: October 5, 1999; 2. "If You Don't Wanna Love Me" Released: March 7, 2000

Tamar is the debut solo studio album by American R&B singer Tamar Braxton. It was released on March 21, 2000, by DreamWorks Records and RedZone Entertainment. The album features guest appearances from Missy Elliott, Jermaine Dupri and Amil, while the production handled by Tim & Bob, Tricky Stewart, among others. Originally entitled Ridiculous, it debuted at number 127 on the US Billboard 200 and number 42 on the Top R&B/Hip-Hop Albums chart. Braxton later admitted in interviews for her second album Love and War that she was not fond of this album due to not having any creative control.

== Background ==
Before the official release, Braxton was the lead singer of the Braxtons, after her sisters Traci and Toni had to leave the group, which left them as a trio of Tamar, Trina and Towanda. After the release of their debut album, So Many Ways (1996), Braxton was offered a solo recording contract with DreamWorks, which she happened to leave the group and begin her solo career. In 2004, Tamar's sister Towanda Braxton appeared on the reality TV series Starting Over during its second season, revealing that Tamar signed a solo contract without telling her or Trina that she left The Braxtons group.

In 1999, she released the EP, Tamar: Just Cuz to generate buzz about her debut album. The Tamar: Just Cuz EP contained 4 songs, "Just Cuz", "Let Him Go" (featuring Solé), "It's Time" (featuring Grand Puba) and "Get Mine".

Her album was originally going to be called Ridiculous, which would have been released in late 1999. Some songs recorded for this album remain unreleased, as this project was scrapped.

== Critical reception ==
Professional ratings
Review scores
Source	Rating
AllMusic	3/5 stars
USA Today	2.5/4 stars

AllMusic editor Roxanne Blanford called Tamar both "impressive and enjoyable." She thought that "this recording is primarily a quiet display of Tamar's competence at present day rhythm & blues with some contemporary hip-hop flavor thrown in. If it wasn't such an all-around good listen, it would certainly be worthy of recognition on the basis of its professional presentation alone." Steve Jones from USA Today noted that Tamar "can sing," though her voice is "less husky and distinctive" than Toni#s, and praised her for holding her own on tracks like "Get None" with Jermaine Dupri and Amil, and the quirky "Respect Me," while observing that the "'he's no good' theme gets monotonous," but her "penchant for turning a catchy tune" gives her a chance to make a name for herself. Colin Ross of PopMatters wrote that the album was a "fairly good R&B album with its share of highlights." He noted that while Tamar "stands up quite well" despite inevitable comparisons to Toni Braxton, the album's sound is "a little formulaic" and lacks the "magic" to make it a hit, though it "has enough quality to appeal" and is "worth checking."

== Track listing ==
Tamar track listing
No.	Title	Writer(s)	Producer(s)	Length
1.	"Get None" (featuring Jermaine Dupri & Amil)	Jermaine Dupri; Bryan-Michael Cox; Tamara Savage; Mýa Harrison; Amil Whitehead	Dupri	3:50
2.	"Your Room"	Tim Kelley; Bob Robinson	Tim & Bob	4:14
3.	"No Disrespect" (featuring Missy Elliott)	Missy Elliott	Missy Elliott	3:35
4.	"Money Can't Buy You Love"	Darrell "Delite" Allamby; Lincoln "Link" Browder	Allamby	4:32
5.	"Tonight"	Kelley; Robinson	Tim & Bob	4:19
6.	"If You Don't Wanna Love Me"	Christopher "Tricky" Stewart; LaTocha Scott	Stewart	3:58
7.	"Once Again"	Allamby	Allamby	4:15
8.	"You Don't Know"	Kelley; Robinson	Tim & Bob	4:06
9.	"Can't Nobody"	Stewart	Stewart	4:34
10.	"I'm Over You"	Stewart; Tamar Braxton	Stewart	4:04
11.	"Words"	Kelley; Robinson	Tim & Bob	3:56
12.	"The Way It Should Be"	Stewart; Braxton	Stewart	4:39
13.	"Miss Your Kiss"	Kelley; Robinson	Tim & Bob	4:22
14.	"Get Mine"	Stewart; Braxton	Stewart	3:45

Japanese Bonus Track
No.	Title	Writer(s)	Producer(s)	Length
15.	"Count the Ways"	Richard Rudolph; Shane August	August	4:39

== Personnel ==
- Keyboards and drum programming: Tim & Bob, Jermaine Dupri, Bryan-Michael Cox, Darrell "Delite" Allamby, Tricky Stewart, The Co-Stars
- Piano: Les Butler, Bob Robinson
- Acoustic guitar: Bob Robinson
- Spanish guitar: Bob Robinson
- Guitar: Paul Pesco, Marlon McClain
- Percussion: Luis C. Conte
- Background vocals: Tamar Braxton, Darcy Aldridge, Mýa (uncredited), Lil' Mo, Missy Elliott, LaTocha Scott, Darrell "Delite" Allamby
- Recording engineers: Jermaine Dupri, Brian K. Smith, Tim Kelley, Carlisle Young, Ben Arrindell, Rob Hunter, Christopher "Tricky" Stewart, Kevin "KD" Davis
- Mixing engineers: Phil Tan, Brian K. Smith, Tim Kelley, Carlisle Young, Ben Arrindell, Kevin "KD" Davis
- Photography: Randee St. Nicholas
- Design: Orabor

== Charts ==
Chart performance for Tamar
Chart (2000)	Peak position
US Billboard 200	127
US Top R&B/Hip-Hop Albums (Billboard)	42
