= Vincent Herbert =

American songwriter and producer (born 1973)

- Born: January 27, 1973 (age 53)
- Origin: Newark, New Jersey, U.S.
- Genres: R&B; soul; pop
- Occupations: Record executive; songwriter; record producer
- Years active: 1989–present
- Labels: Streamline; Interscope
- Spouse: Tamar Braxton (m. 2008; div. 2019)

Vincent Herbert (born January 27, 1973) is an American record executive and record producer. He founded Streamline Records in 2007, an imprint of Interscope Records through which he has signed artists including Lady Gaga, Greyson Chance, Tamar Braxton.

== Work ==
He has worked with artists such as Aaliyah, Tatyana Ali, Toni Braxton, Destinee & Paris, Destiny's Child, Dream, Hi-Five, JoJo, Mindless Behavior, OMG Girlz, Mishon Ratliff as well as Lady Gaga, and his ex-wife, Tamar Braxton.

Among other work, Herbert co-starred with his ex-wife in their WE tv reality series Tamar & Vince, a spinoff of her family's reality show Braxton Family Values, which premiered on the network on September 20, 2012. Herbert also managed his ex-wife Tamar Braxton's career, and served as an executive producer on her second studio album Love and War which was released on his record label Streamline Records coincide with its parent label Interscope Records and Epic Records (all jointly signed Tamar as an artist to each label).

== Personal life ==
Herbert married singer Tamar Braxton in 2008. Their son was born in 2013. In October 2017, Braxton filed for divorce from Herbert, citing "irreconcilable differences" and was seeking joint custody of their son. Their divorce was finalized on July 16, 2019.

Herbert and Braxton starred in the reality TV show Tamar & Vince.

== Credit ==
Year	Release	Artist	Credit
1991	A Closer Look	Babyface	Remixing
1992	Time for Love	Freddie Jackson	Producer, Composer
1992	"We Didn't Know"	Whitney Houston	Remixing
1992	Sexy Versus	Al B. Sure!	Producer
1992	Keep It Goin' On	Hi-Five	Producer, Composer
1993	Toni Braxton	Toni Braxton	Producer, Mixing, Remixing, Composer
1993	Something on the Inside	Vanessa Bell Armstrong	Producer, Drums, Composer
1993	Me-2-U	Me-2-U	Mixing, Programming, Drum Programming, Vocals (Background), Composer
1993	Friends Can Be Lovers	Dionne Warwick	Producer
1993	An Invitation To Love	The Deele	Producer, Composer
1998	Angie & Debbie	Angie & Debbie Winans	Producer, Mixing
1993	All Out	The Winans	Producer, Mixing
1994	Smoothe Sylk	Smoothe Sylk	Producer, Arranger, Multi Instruments, Performer, Composer, Primary Artist
1994	N II U	N II U	Composer
1995	"There Will Never Be" [CD/Vinyl Single]	N II U	Producer, Executive Producer, Composer
1995	Here I Am	Joya	Executive Producer
1995	Deborah Cox	Deborah Cox	Drums, Producer
1996	Vybin' Young Soul Rebels		Producer, Composer
1996	Uptown Records Block Party, Vol. 1		Composer
1996	One in a Million	Aaliyah	Producer, Mixing
1996	Moods...Moments	Monifah	Composer
1997	This Is Christmas!	United States Air Force Symphony Orchestra	Composer
1997	No, No, No [4 Track #1]	Destiny's Child	Producer, Composer
1997	My Dream	Yvette Michele	Producer, Mixing, Composer
1998	Rush Hour [Original Soundtrack]		Producer, Arranger, Vocal Arrangement
1998	Mo'hogany	Monifah	Producer, Mixing, Vocal Producer, Composer
1998	MTV Party to Go 1999		Composer
1998	Let's Ride	Montell Jordan	Composer
1998	Kiss the Sky	Tatyana Ali	Producer, Composer
1998	"Rush Hour"		Composer
1998	KW	Keith Washington	Producer, Multi Instruments, Composer
1998	I Got the Hook Up		Producer, Multi Instruments
1998	Destiny's Child	Destiny's Child	Producer, Composer
1998	DJ Mix '99		Composer
1998	Boss Beats, Vol. 2		Composer
1998	Any Weather	4Kast	Producer, Composer
1998	Anthology	Freddie Jackson	Composer
1999	The Writing's on the Wall	Destiny's Child	Composer
1999	The P.J.'s		Producer, Mixing, Composer
1999	The Best of Black '98		Composer
1999	Summer Heat 1999, Vol. 1		Producer
1999	Pure Swing: The Very Best of 90's		Composer
1999	Introducing IMx	IMx	Producer, Mixing, Composer
1999	Classic Limited Edition	Made Men	Producer
1999	Breaking Through		Composer
1999	Back to the Real	Reel Tight	Composer
2000	He Loves U Not [US CD/12"]	Dream	Associate Executive Producer
2000	ESP	The System	Producer, Composer
2001	Pure R&B, Vol. 2		Composer
2001	JP	Jesse Powell	Composer
2001	It Was All a Dream	Dream	Producer, Associate Executive Producer
2001	He Loves U Not [Import CD]	Dream	Associate Executive Producer
2001	Greatest Hits	Immature	Producer, Composer
2001	Continuous Mix Tribute to Destiny's Child	DJ Revolver	Composer
2001	A Tribute to Destiny's Child		Composer
2006	Too Little Too Late	JoJo	Producer
2010	"Alejandro"	Lady Gaga	Executive Producer, A&R
2013	Defected Presents for the Love of House, Vol. 1		Composer
2013	The One/Love and War	Tamar Braxton	Executive Producer
2017	4 to the Floor presents Movin' Records		Composer
