= Princeton Perez =

American singer-songwriter (born 1996)

- Born: Jacob Anthony Perez; April 21, 1996 (age 30); Downey, California, US
- Other names: Princeton; Papi Chulo
- Occupations: Singer; actor; dancer
- Musical career
- Genres: Pop; R&B
- Instruments: Vocals; piano; guitar
- Years active: 2006–present
- Labels: Interscope; Epic Records
- Formerly of: Mindless Behavior

Jacob Anthony Perez (born April 21, 1996), better known as Princeton Perez, is an American singer-songwriter, professional dancer, and actor. Born and raised in Downey, California, near Los Angeles, Perez began his career at a young age when he appeared in television advertisements for companies such as Nike, McDonald's, and Skechers. Perez later rose to fame as a member of the boy band Mindless Behavior, in which he remained from 2008 until the group's disbandment in 2017.

== Life and career ==
=== 2006–2008: Early life and career beginnings ===
Perez was born in Downey, California to an African-American father and Mexican mother. In 2006, Perez was cast in two Gym Class Heroes music videos. "Shoot Down the Stars" followed him as a younger version of Travie McCoy, being bullied by other students. "Cupid's Chokehold", however portrayed him as a young Cupid, shooting Travie with a bow and arrow, causing the rapper to express his love for various women in the video. In an interview with AwesomenessTV, Perez has stated that he had also danced backup for Nicole Scherzinger.

At the age of 11, Perez appeared on commercials for Skechers, McDonald's and Nike, which helped progress his career in entertainment. He was also cast in High School Musical 3, playing a small part as the young Corbin Bleu, but he could not take the role as it was around the same time he became a member of Mindless Behavior. Perez had worked with choreographers such as Dave Scott and Kaelynn Harris of 8 Flavahz.

=== 2008–14: Mindless Behavior: #1 Girl and All Around the World ===
Lakeisha Gamble, one of the contributing founders of Mindless Behavior, convinced future producer of the group, Walter Millsap, to form an American boy band. He was opposed to the idea at first, as explained in the film, Mindless Behavior: All Around the World. Dave Scott, a choreographer with prior experience working with Perez at the Debbie Allen Academy, had been recommended to contact Perez to audition for the group after seeing him in Gym Class Heroes' music videos. Perez received approval to join the new group within the same night and had been the first member to be selected, preceding Chresanto "Roc Royal" August, Rayan "Ray Ray" Lopez, and Craig "Prodigy" Crippen. Gamble, inspired by Princeton University, had given Perez the alias, owing to his extensive knowledge of diverse music genres.

For two years, the group immersed themselves in music, developing their musical sound and style under the guidance of Herbert and Millsap. Building their performance repertoire, they staged shows at local schools as part of the CLASSCFIED High School Tour and engaged with their growing fanbase through creative content such as their "MB Cam" YouTube vlog channel. Following these efforts, Interscope Records chairman Jimmy Iovine signed Mindless Behavior to the label. Mindless Behavior toured with The Backstreet Boys, Jason Derulo, Justin Bieber, and was an opening act for Janet Jackson during her Number Ones, Up Close and Personal tour. The group had grown in popularity from frequently appearing on BET's 106 & Park, and also headlined the first BET Closer to My Dreams Tour alongside Diggy Simmons, Lil Twist, Trevante and Jawan Harris. In 2011, Mindless Behavior headlined the Scream Tour with Diggy Simmons, which featured The OMG Girlz, Jacob Latimore, and Hamilton Park. The group performed at the White House three times, and were the first African-American boy band to do so. They were notable performers at Arthur Ashe Kids' Day.

In 2012, Mindless Behavior embarked on their headlined U.S. tour, named after their debut album "No. 1 Girl," with opening acts Jacob Latimore, Lil Twist, and Kayla Brianna. While on tour, the group visited the Ronald McDonald House in Georgia to be of comfort for the young patients who were battling cancer. In 2013, the group performed for Wade's World Foundation, an organization by Dwyane Wade that provides support to community-based organizations that promote education, health and social skills for children in at-risk situations. Following the release of their sophomore album "All Around The World", the group embarked on their eponymous tour, featuring The OMG Girlz and Coco Jones. Subsequent to the tour, news sources began speculating about the addition of a new member to the group following the departure of lead singer Prodigy. For nearly two years, Mindless Behavior continued to perform, albeit without a lead vocalist. Elijah Johnson replaced him as the lead singer in April 2014. Mindless Behavior later signed a deal with Epic Records.

=== 2015–16: Group changes and #OfficialMBMusic ===
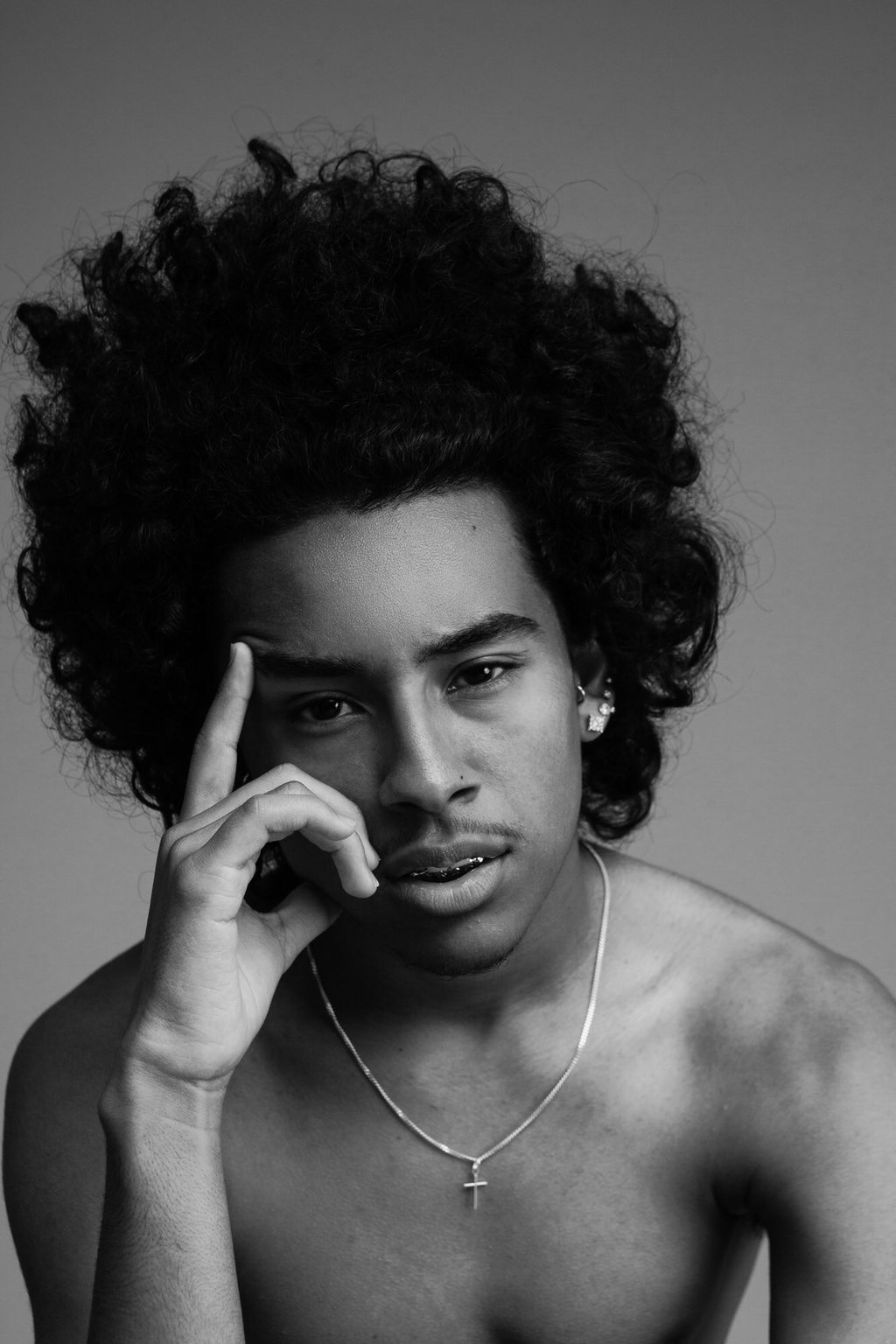
Perez in 2016, attending a photoshoot for his 20th birthday

During the hiatus of Mindless Behavior, Perez actively engaged with Team Mindless, their dedicated fanbase, by regularly sharing photos, videos, and short films on his blog, Outsiders Ink. In an interview that featured the group in January 2015, both Perez and Lopez ("Ray Ray") stated they had been working on their own solo projects outside of the group. Perez independently released "Don't Believe in Love" via SoundCloud, a track blending reggae fusion and pop influences, amassing over 800,000 listens before later being removed from Perez's account. Subsequent to the departure of August ("Roc Royal") from Mindless Behavior, management replaced him with vocalist Michael "Mike River" Martin, and the group embarked on the creation of their third studio album, which was ultimately shelved. Following this, Lopez also exited the group, citing creative differences, leaving Perez as the sole remaining original member from the band's inception in 2008.

With the abandonment of the project, the group redirected their efforts, later releasing the group's final album, #OfficialMBMusic, in 2016. After the album release, the group began shooting Misguided Behavior, a drama film directed by Carl Payne, starring Clifton Powell, Towanda Braxton, and Khalil Kain. Concurrently, Mindless Behavior unveiled their "#NoParentsAllowed" tour in September 2016. Sponsored by Alcatel in support of their latest studio album, the 23-city tour was initially set to kick off on November 9 in Greensboro, North Carolina; however, in November 2016, all group members announced the postponement of the tour, with various ticket websites reflecting its cancellation. In a YouNow, Perez communicated with fans, explaining that the group does not control tour dates, and had been trying to schedule dates since earlier that year.

=== 2017–present: Solo career and Papi Chulo Prelude ===
In 2017, Perez addressed a fan on Instagram about the group's hiatus, suggesting that the music industry's structure hindered their creative freedom and hinting that if "certain managers" and record labels granted Mindless Behavior ownership of their music and group name, they could produce more music; prior to this, widespread rumors of the band disbanding were dispelled by bandmate Mike River. In February, Perez took to Twitter to publicly declare Mindless Behavior's disbandment, citing the group's inability to secure rights to their music and their desire to pursue individual endeavors. On February 23, the tracklist for Taylor Bennett's project, "Restoration of An American Idol," was unveiled, with Perez featured in the introductory track titled "The Kid's Alright." In March, Perez appeared on the cover of 360 Magazine, marking his inaugural solo magazine cover following the disbandment of Mindless Behavior. In April, on the eve of his twenty-first birthday, Perez appeared the cover of Obvious Magazine, followed by a feature on the cover of Tinsley Magazine in June.

That year, Perez was invited as a guest to the Las Vegas Teen Town Hall, where he joined former Mindless Behavior group member Elijah Johnson and Diamond White. Hosted by City Councilman Ricki Y. Barlow, the event was attended by representatives from ten different high schools within the district. As part of the event, Barlow presented a proclamation from the city of Las Vegas, officially declaring May 30 as Diamond White, Elijah "EJ" Johnson, and Jacob "Princeton" Perez Day, recognizing and honoring the contributions of each guest. At the BET Experience preceding the BET Awards 2017, Perez served as the host for the Teen Summit panel, a program that had been absent from syndication since 2002. Furthermore, in collaboration with Obvious Magazine, Perez a tour spanning several cities across the United States; however, the tour was ultimately cancelled due to scheduling conflicts arising from Perez's commitment to filming #WarGames. In 2018, Perez had been gearing up for the release of his debut solo music record, produced by Timeless Music Group; subsequently, on June 12, 2019, "Perfect World" made its debut on the Tidal music streaming service. In August, Perez was a guest on Angela Yee's Lip Service Podcast. In December 2019, Perez released the Christmas in Malibu EP.

"Transitioning from a group to a solo artist, it's been organic because originally I wasn't planning on going solo. I didn't have a plan, but I think that's why it worked out."

— Perez, regarding his decision to pursue a solo career.

In 2020, Perez released his single "Chew It Up," which gained substantial traction on the social media platform TikTok, alongside the release of a music video for his single "Control". In August 2023, Perez made an appearance in the music video for "Dance To The Rhythm" by Dia La Ren Nash, the daughter of Niecy Nash. Perez later released the single "Suelo" — clarifying that it would be part of a Spanish-speaking project later to be released.

== Style and influences ==
Perez has stated that his influences, both fashion, musicality, and performance are John Lennon, Prince, Michael Jackson, David Bowie, Usher, Chris Brown, and a few rock bands, including Nirvana, Sublime and The Misfits, the latter of which inspiring his original Instagram handle "princemisfit" and later, "peacepunkprince". Perez's fascination with fashion was apparent, characterized by his androgynous style, and a unique blend influenced by punk-rock, grunge bands, and a nostalgic nod to 1970s hippie culture. He participated as a judge in the "Face of Spoiled Show & Contest" with Eva Marcille in July 2014.

== Advocacy ==
Princeton has openly supported People for the Ethical Treatment of Animals and its initiatives to end the mistreatment and abuse of animals. In a 2015 campaign for the peta2's Hottest Vegetarian Celebrities, Princeton won alongside Zendaya.

== Filmography ==
Film
Year	Title	Role	Notes
2012	Bad Behavior	DJ	Unreleased
2012	Boombox: All Access With Mindless Behavior	Himself	Concert film
2013	Mindless Behavior: All Around the World	Himself	Documentary
2013	Big Time Movie	Himself	
2014	Secrets of the Magic City	Himself (credited as Mindless Behavior)	
2014	GBlok Presents: Spark It Up Live	Musical guest	TV movie
2015	The Secret to Success: They Can No Longer Keep It from Us	Interviewee	
2017	Misguided Behavior	Christopher Arnold	Main role

Television
Year	Title	Notes
2010–2013	106 & Park	5 episodes
2011	So Random!	Episode: "Mindless Behavior"
2011	The Mo'Nique Show	Episode 108
2011	The Rosie Show	Justin Bieber and Mindless Behavior
2012	KARtv Dance Television	Episode 05
2012	Piper's Quick Picks	Episode: "Mindless Behavior & Celeste Kellogg Talk Music & Videos"
2012	Piper's Picks TV	Episode: "How to Dump a Guy by Dumping on a Milkshake on a Guy's Head?"
2012	The Ellen Degeneres Show	Episode 70
2012	Tamar & Vince	Mindless Takeover
2012	Koko Pop	Season 3, Episode 2
2013	Good Morning America	Season 38, Episode 137
2013	The Show with Vinny	Episode: "Jenny McCarthy and Mindless Behavior"
2013	Big Morning Buzz Live	Episode: "Steve Carell/Ian Somerhalder/Megan Hilty/Mindless Behavior"
2013	Big Time Rush	Episode: "Big Time Dreams"
2013	LA Live the Show	Episode: "Artist in Spot Light"
2013	Daphne's Lala Land	Season 2, Episode 16
2014	Evolution Of...	Mindless Behavior
2016	Minay TV	2016 BET Experience
2017	Teen Summit	Host
2018	#WarGames	As Bryce
2018	BreKarate	

Music videos
Year	Artist	Song
2006	Gym Class Heroes	"Cupid's Chokehold"
2007	Gym Class Heroes	"Shoot Down The Stars"
2016	Dayna Frintz	"Seven Nation Army"
2023	Dia La Ren Nash	"Dance To The Rhythm"

== Tours ==
=== Concert tours ===
Headlining

- Number 1 Girl Tour (2012)
- All Around The World Tour (2013)
- No Parents Allowed Tour (2017) (cancelled)
- Princeton Pop-Up Tour (2017) (cancelled)

Co-headlining;

- Closer to My Dreams Tour (2011)
- The Scream Tour (2011)

Opening act

- My World Tour (2010) (North American select dates)
- This Is Us Tour (2010) (North American select dates)
- AOL AIM presents: (2011) (Europe—Leg 2)
- Number Ones, Up Close and Personal (2010) (North American select dates)

== See also ==
- List of Afro-Latinos
