= Teen Summit =

US television program USA

- Genre: Talk show
- Created by: Sheila Johnson; Tony Regusters
- Developed by: Tony Regusters; Byrd/George Productions; Strange Fruit Films
- Written by: Tony Regusters
- Directed by: Rick Johnson; Alisa McCoy; Cindy Birch; Nia Hill; Mercedes Funderburk (talent)
- Presented by: Jay Cooper; Durik Dajour; Gabrielle Dennis; Adimu Colon; Cinque Glendy; Belma Johnson; Marcelle Larice; Ananda Lewis; Tisha Lewis; Lisa Johnson Smith
- Country of origin: United States
- Original language: English
- No. of seasons: 11

Production
- Executive producers: Debra Tang; Tony Regusters; D'Angela Steed
- Producers: Timiza Sanyika; Zahrah Farmer; Sharifa Johka; Cindy Birch; Velma Johnson; Fran Toliver Edwards; John 'Dr. Teeth" Tucker; Sita Lewis; Danielle Lazarus
- Editor: Tim Warner
- Running time: 60 minutes

Original release
- Network: BET
- Release: September 16, 1989 – August 31, 2002

Teen Summit is an American youth talk show youth that aired on BET from September 16, 1989 to August 31, 2002. In recent years, it has returned as an occasional special to the network's schedule.

== Background ==
Created by Black Entertainment Television chief operating officer Sheila Johnson, and producer Tony Regusters, Teen Summit focused on the everyday issues faced by American teenagers and attempted to bring them into perspective, and in a positive, uplifting light, while motivating teen viewers and their families to discuss the subjects presented on the weekly, one-hour, live show. After the original program host, Lisa Johnson, moved on in 1993, others filled the hosting vacuum, including Dajour Bullock and Ananda Lewis.

== Cancellation and subsequent specials ==
After 13 years, Teen Summit was cancelled on August 31, 2002. Since then, it has returned twice, as a special called Teen Summit: Backstage Pass on June 21, 2007, then on June 25, 2017 as a part of that year's "BET Experience" festival in Los Angeles, hosted by Mindless Behavior's Princeton Perez.

== Hosts ==
Hosts	Years	Notes
Lisa Johnson Smith	1989-1994	
Belma Johnson	1994	
Durik "Prince" Dajour	1994-1998	
Fran Toliver Edwards	1996-2001	(Note: As "On Jam" Fran.)
Ananda Lewis	1997-1999	
Gabrielle Dennis	1998-2000	
Adimu Colon	2000	
Jay Cooper	2000-2003	
Cinque Glendy	2002-2003	
Marcelle Larice	2002-2003	(Note: As Marcelle Kroll.)

== Other performers ==
Hosts	Years
Gerald Norde	1990-1994
Nicole Renée Harris	1989-1992
Kenji Jasper	1989-1993
Yolanda D. Coleman	1989-1994
Krystal Glenn	1992-1995
Cocoa Chanelle	1994-2001
Derrell "D-Knott" Ross	1994-1999
Tariqa Waters	1997-1998
Tisha Lewis	1996-2002
Don Champion	1999-2002
Princeton Perez	2017

== Posse / Squad Members ==
- Ajahmure Clovis
- Brandi Garrett
- Cheickh Aidara
- James Anthony
- Micah Baham
- Theresa Jackson
- Veronica King
- Shannon Washington
- Stephanie (Staples) Hack
- Eryn Scott
- Nia Phillips Spencer
- Guy Lockard
