= Santo August =

American singer (born 1997)

- Born: Chresanto August; July 23, 1997 (age 29); Los Angeles, California, U.S.
- Other names: Roc Royal; DoubleR; Santo Tha Plugg
- Occupations: Rapper; singer; dancer
- Children: 2
- Musical career
- Genres: R&B; pop; hip hop
- Instrument: Vocals
- Years active: 2008–2016
- Labels: 319 Music Group; Interscope (former)
- Formerly of: Mindless Behavior

Chresanto August (born July 23, 1997), professionally known as Santo August (previously known as Roc Royal), is an American rapper, singer, dancer, and former member of boy band Mindless Behavior.

== Life and career ==
=== 2008–13: #1 Girl and All Around the World ===
Lakeisha Gamble, one of the contributing founders of Mindless Behavior, convinced future producer of the group, Walter Millsap, to form an American boy band. He was opposed to the idea at first, as explained in the film, Mindless Behavior: All Around the World. Millsap is the founder of Conjunction Entertainment Inc., and has worked with the likes of Beyoncé, Alicia Keys, and Jennifer Lopez. Along with Gamble and Millsap, there was Streamline Records head Vincent Herbert, who agreed on the concept of forming a boy band. Following the idea of forming the group, Gamble, Millsap, Herbert, songwriter Candice Nelson, and choreographer David Scott held open auditions in California in an attempt to find local boys that would fit the criteria of the group. Augusts' cousin had known Gamble, who encouraged her to bring him to the auditions. He was unaware of the group auditions, and was set to attend football practice the day of. Instead, his mother told instructed him to get dressed in his football uniform, misleading him, as they’d gone to the auditions instead. For the auditions, he had to remember choreography that was given by Dave Scott. He performed them backwards, and was a terrible dancer. However, Gamble liked his personality, and thought he could improve overtime, much to Millsap's dismay. In turn, he missed football tryouts, but he was the second member to join Mindless Behavior, behind that of Princeton.

August was given the stage name Roc Royal by Gamble, due to his personality. "Roc" was used as an alternate spelling for the word "rock", showing his tough side. However, "Royal" was to show his softer, sweet side. Joining soon after Princeton and August were Prodigy (Craig Crippen, Jr.) and Ray Ray (Rayan Lopez). For the next two years, they immersed themselves in music, developing their musical sound and style under the guidance of Herbert and Millsap. They moved in with their manager, Gamble, and began frequently rehearing dance routines, changing their diets, and getting to know one another. August's mother, Tiffany Larkin, exclaimed that the transition was extremely difficult for the mothers of the group. They were not able to see their children as much as they wanted to. However, once their manager felt as though they were ready, they set up a showcase to perform for various labels. The last performance was for Management Group International, owned by successful entrepreneur and music manager, Kenneth Crear. Crear was immediately interested in signing the group. Soon after, they remained in development, but also began working on original music. Gaining their performance repertoire, they put on shows at local schools on the CLASSCFIED High School Tour. This helped them gain fans and recognition, along with their YouTube channel that held their creative "MB Cam" and Ustream account. Soon afterwards, Interscope Records chairman Jimmy Iovine signed Mindless Behavior to the label.

Before headlining their own tours, Mindless Behavior toured with many established musicians, such as The Backstreet Boys, Jason Derulo, Justin Bieber, and was an opening act for Janet Jackson during her Number Ones, Up Close and Personal tour. The group had become quite popular from appearing on BET's 106 & Park, and also headlined the first BET Closer to My Dreams Tour alongside Diggy Simmons, Lil Twist, Trevante and Jawan Harris. In 2011, Mindless Behavior headlined the Scream Tour with Diggy Simmons, which featured The OMG Girlz, Jacob Latimore, and Hamilton Park. The group also performed at the White House twice and were the first African American boy band to do so. Also in 2011, they performed at the prestigious White House Easter Egg Roll. In 2012, they were performers at Arthur Ashe Kids' Day. In 2013, the group performed for Wade's World Foundation, an organization by Dwyane Wade that provides support to community-based organizations that promote education, health and social skills for children in at-risk situations. They were also welcomed back to the White House to perform at the Kids Inaugural Ball.

In July 2012, the group headlined their largest U.S. tour. The tour held the same name as their debut album. The No. 1 Girl Tour held opening acts from artists Jacob Latimore, Lil Twist, and Kayla Brianna. While on tour, the group visited the Ronald McDonald House in Georgia to cheer up some of the young patients who were battling cancer. In 2013, the group embarked on their All Around The World Tour. Since joining Mindless Behavior, Princeton, along with former bandmates Roc Royal, Ray Ray and Prodigy, have released two albums, performed on tour, and sold over 327,000 album copies in the United States. Later within the year, many news sources announced that there would be a new member after the group's lead singer, Craig Crippen Jr., who known as Prodigy, had left the group. After lead singer Prodigy left the group, Mindless Behavior did not release any material. As seen in many interviews, there had only been Princeton, Roc Royal, and Ray Ray, which meant that there hadn't been a lead singer introduced. For almost two years, Mindless Behavior participated in interviews, and even held shows for their fans, without a lead singer. However, many of these shows included nothing but the band performing dance routines, while Prodigy's voice played in the background. Elijah Johnson replaced him as the lead singer in April 2014.

=== 2014–15: Legal issues, group departure, and Amazing ===
Following this hiatus, Mindless Behavior were removed from Interscope's roster, and signed a deal with Epic Records.

In July 2014, August was videotaped beating a man, and he posted the video on his personal Instagram account. Although he deleted the video from his profile, the video was later posted to YouTube, and shared by thousands. In the video, a shirtless August walks over to a man who is kneeling over a bicycle and ruthlessly punches him multiple times ending with a kick to the face. Sources close to him, such as friends, say that the man had money that was to be owed to August, and there was no specific amount of debt mentioned. After the incident had spread, he went to his Twitter account to shed light on the situation, explaining: "I'm just a lil one out here on my own, no mom because she stay taking from me & no father because he wasn't around until all this happened. You guys would only know half of my story, only what's on screen & definitely not behind scenes. But sorry for my misbehavior guys I reacted so fast because the fact I gave him a past [sic] many times and every single time there was excuses. Sometimes it sucks waiting on somebody else time to get what they promised you, if you said a specific day & time for my money than I want my stuff."

Four months later, in November 2014, August was tagged as the main suspect after the BMW 325i of producer Chris Clark went missing while on a studio session with Santo. Clark had left the car keys on a table in the studio, but when he went to leave, the keys – and August – were gone. August's refusal to cooperate ended with Clark going to the authorities. A month later, in December 2014, it was announced by August, via his Twitter account, that he'd been removed from Mindless Behavior.

In 2015, a year after being released from the group, August began working on his solo career as a rapper/singer. Formally, he is signed with 319 Music Group & Films, an entertainment company operating out of Inglewood, California. In February, he was featured on "Number", a song by Courtlend, that featured SJ3 and August, who went under the alias "DoubleR". Soon after, he ditched both the stage name Roc Royal and DoubleR, and began referring to himself as a shortened version of his name – "Santo" August. In June, August released his first solo single since his release from Mindless Behavior, a hip-hop pop song, titled "Amazing". Amazing was widely accepted by fans of the group, and has over 1.5 million plays on his SoundCloud account. The video for the single was released in July 2015. In August, he released his second single, "No Limits". His channel on YouTube, "SantoAugustTV" showcased interviews that he attended and performances that he held.

=== 2016–present: Arrest and new music ===
In February 2016, August was arrested and charged with both robbery and battery. In April, he accepted a plea deal of two years in jail, and began serving his time in July. However, he would be eligible for release by Spring 2017 for good behavior, which he has since maintained. A relative of August says that he should be released in May 2017. August himself held an Instagram Live, speaking with fans about his situation, and posted a photo of himself, with the caption "#comingsoon".

While in jail, a few of his songs were released. "I’m The Plug" and "I Choose Her" were released in March 2016. August has a project that is set to be released after he is out of jail.

== Personal life ==
In 2014, August welcomed a baby named Royal August, with his then-girlfriend, Desiree Twyman. Also in 2018, he and his then girlfriend, welcomed another baby boy by the name of Bronx.

== Filmography ==
Film
Year	Title	Role	Notes	Ref
2012	Bad Behavior	Marcus	Unreleased	
2012	Boombox: All Access With Mindless Behavior	Himself	Concert film	
2013	Mindless Behavior: All Around the World	Himself	Documentary	
2013	Big Time Movie	Himself	Television movie	
2014	Secrets of the Magic City	Himself (credited as: Mindless Behavior)		
2014	GBlok Presents: Spark It Up Live	Musical guest	TV movie	
2015	The Secret to Success: They Can No Longer Keep It from Us	Interviewee		

Television
Year	Title	Notes	Ref
2010–2013	106 & Park	5 episodes	
2011	So Random!	Episode: "Mindless Behavior"	
2011	The Mo'Nique Show	Episode 108	
2012	KARtv Dance Television	Episode 05	
2012	Piper's Quick Picks	Episode: "Mindless Behavior & Celeste Kellogg Talk Music & Videos"	
2012	Piper's Picks TV	Episode: "How to Dump a Guy by Dumping on a Milkshake on a Guy's Head?"	
2012	The Ellen Degeneres Show	Episode 70	
2012	Tamar & Vince	Mindless Takeover	
2013	Good Morning America	Season 38, Episode 137	
2013	The Show with Vinny	Episode: "Jenny McCarthy and Mindless Behavior"	
2013	Big Morning Buzz Live	Episode: "Steve Carell/Ian Somerhalder/Megan Hilty/Mindless Behavior"	
2013	Big Time Rush	Episode: "Big Time Dreams"	
2013	LA Live the Show	Episode: "Artist in Spot Light"	
