= Dana Hammond =

American drummer

- Born: July 4, 1978 (age 46); Los Angeles, California, United States
- Origin: Los Angeles
- Genres: Soul, R&B, hip hop, gospel, blues, rock, pop
- Occupation(s): Record producer, songwriter, composer, musician
- Instrument(s): Piano, drums, bass guitar
- Years active: 2003–present
- Labels: Atlantic, Sony Music Entertainment, Columbia, Music World, Interscope
- Website: www.danahammond.me www.choicegroupinc.org

Dana Hammond (born July 4, 1978) is a record producer, composer, songwriter, drummer and bass guitarist.

== Early life ==
Dana Hammond was born in Los Angeles. Dana grew up in Inglewood, California, he started to play drums at age five and piano at age 16. At age nine he began to play for his local church, the church music ministry allowed Dana to hone his skills and travel to places like New York and Oslo, Norway.

== Background ==
Hammond has worked with artists such as Faith Hill and Mary Mary and licensed his music to film and television including Charlie's Angels, The Jamie Foxx Show, and City Guys. Hammond's music has been accessed on MTV, LA Ink, and VH-1 and he has produced songs with various labels including Atlantic, Interscope Records, and Def Jam Records. Hammond plays the drums, piano, and bass guitar and is experienced with production tools such as Logic Audio and Pro Tools.

== Musical career ==
Hammond played drums on the album Mary Mary it released on July 19, 2005, and peaked at number eight on the U.S. Billboard 200 and number four on the U.S. Billboard Top R&B/Hip-Hop Albums. In 2006, the album Mary Mary won a Dove Award for Contemporary Gospel Album of the Year at the 37th GMA Dove Awards.

In 2005, Hammond was credited as a producer on I Gotta Make It the debut album by American R&B singer-songwriter Trey Songz. Released in the United States on July 26, 2005, the album debuted at #20 on the Billboard 200. The album was released on Atlantic Records and features guest appearances by Twista, Aretha Franklin, Juvenile and T.I.

In 2006, Hammond was credited as a producer on A Mary Mary Christmas, a Christmas album by Mary Mary. Release on October 10, 2006. The album peaked at number thirty three on the U.S. Billboard Top R&B/Hip-Hop Albums. In 2007, the album was nominated for a Dove Award for Christmas Album of the Year at the 38th GMA Dove Awards.

In 2007 Hammond produced the single "Beautiful Girl" on T57, the fifth album of gospel group Trin-i-tee 5:7. The album was released September 18, 2007, on Spirit Rising Music. T57 charted #102 on Billboard 200, #2 on the Top Gospel Albums, #5 on the Top Christian charts, and #12 on the Top R&B charts. In 2008, T57 became certified platinum, selling over one million copies worldwide. The album spent over 73 weeks on the Top Gospel charts. "Listen" was released as the album's lead single and charted #1 on the gospel radio charts and #89 on Hot R&B charts. In early 2008, "I Will Lift" was released as the album's second single. "Get Away" was released as the lead single of the deluxe edition. "Get Away" charted at #3 on gospel radio charts. In December 2008, the cover song known as "Soul Is Anchored" was released as the album's fourth single.

In 2011, Hammond was credited as a producer on the album #1 Girl which is the debut studio album by American boy band Mindless Behavior. The album was released on September 20, 2011. The album debuted at number 7 on the Billboard 200 with 36,000 copies sold in its first week.
