= Tyrel Jackson Williams =

American actor (born 1997)

- Born: March 16, 1997 (age 29); Westchester County, New York, U.S.
- Other names: TJOnline; TJW; theMetroNorth
- Occupations: Actor; musician
- Years active: 2004–present
- Relatives: Tyler James Williams (brother); Tylen Jacob Williams (brother)

Tyrel Jackson Williams (born March 16, 1997), also known under the stage name theMetroNorth (formerly TJW and TJOnline), is an American actor, rapper, singer and record producer. He starred as Leo Dooley in the Disney XD series Lab Rats. Williams also co-starred in the 2014 Disney XD television film Pants on Fire. From 2017 to 2020, he co-starred in the comedy series Brockmire.

In 2019, Williams founded the hip-hop collective Grouptherapy, alongside fellow child actors Jadagrace, Coy Stewart, and Elijah Johnson. In 2024, Williams announced his departure from the group.

== Early and personal life ==
Williams was born in Westchester County, New York, on March 16, 1997. His mother, Angela Williams, is a counselor, and his father, Le'Roy Williams, is a teacher and retired police sergeant. Both have worked as musicians.

Williams has two siblings, both of whom are also actors; Tyler James Williams (b. 1992) and Tylen Jacob Williams (b. 2001). Like his older brother, he suffers from Crohn's disease. In 2023, Tyrel and Tylen came out as LGBTQ+.

== Career ==
Williams had roles in the feature films The Naked Brothers Band: The Movie in 2005, and Failure to Launch in 2006. He has also appeared in national commercials for companies such as Target, Verizon, McDonald's, Chex Mix and General Mills. Williams appeared in two episodes of the television series Everybody Hates Chris starting in 2005, as a younger version of Chris who was played by his older brother Tyler James Williams.

In 2011, Williams was cast in the Disney XD series Lab Rats which premiered in 2012, playing the main role of Leo who stumbles upon the existence of the titular bionic heroes. He had a starring role in the 2014 Disney XD television film Pants on Fire. He was also a singing actor for Tyrone in the Nickelodeon animated television series The Backyardigans.

In 2016, Williams was cast in the role of Charles, an internet whiz who has been hired to be the assistant to a minor league baseball team and its sports announcer (Hank Azaria), in the 2017 IFC comedy series Brockmire.

Williams, along with friends Coy Stewart and Jadagrace, formed the music collective "Grouptherapy". On April 1, 2020, the collective released their debut EP entitled this is not the album. and later released their debut mixtape, there goes the neighborhood. on October 30, 2020.

On March 20, 2024, it was announced that Williams had left Grouptherapy.

On January 9, 2026, Williams released his first single Motorcity Trippin' under his new moniker "theMetroNorth".

== Filmography ==
Television and film roles
Year	Title	Role	Notes
2005–2007	Everybody Hates Chris	Young Chris	2 episodes
2005	The Naked Brothers Band: The Movie	Toy Guitar Boy	Television film
2006	Failure to Launch	Jeffrey	Film
2008–2013	The Backyardigans	Tyrone	Main singing voice role; 31 episodes (seasons 3–4)
2010	Modern Family	Little Phil	Episode: "Game Changer"
2010	Good Luck Charlie	Jasper	Episode: "Study Date"
2010–2012	Community	Jordan Bennett	2 episodes; uncredited
2011	Pair of Kings	Hilo Tutuki	Episode: "The King Beneath My Wings"
2011	Batman: The Brave and the Bold	Kyle	Voice role; Episode: "Powerless!"
2012	Motorcity	Philip	Voice role; Episode: "Ride of the Fantasy Vans"
2012–2016	Lab Rats	Leo Dooley	Main role
2012–2014	Just Kidding	Himself	Co-host
2014	Pants on Fire	Mikey	Television film (Disney XD)
2015	Mighty Med	Leo Dooley	Episode: "Lab Rats vs. Mighty Med"
2016	Future-Worm!	Presto	Voice role; 3 episodes
2017–2020	Brockmire	Charles	Main role (seasons 1–2); recurring role (seasons 3–4)
2021	Thunder Force	Jessie	Television film
2022	Hollywood Stargirl	Terrell	Television film
2023	Party Down	Sackson	Main role (season 3)
