= Coy Stewart =

American actor, rapper, and singer (born 1998)

Tyson Coy Stewart
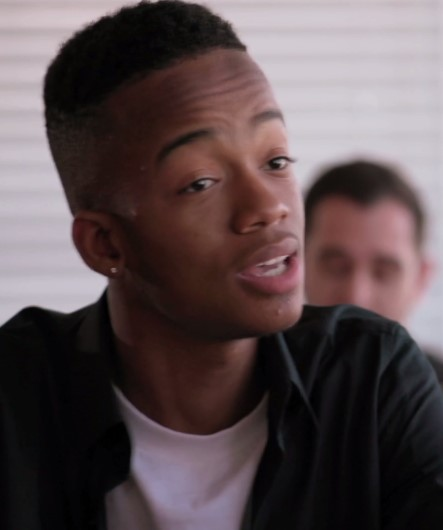
- Stewart in 2016
- Born: June 24, 1998 (age 28); Columbia, South Carolina, U.S.
- Other names: Tyson Stewart; KOI (2018–2022); SWIM (2022–present)
- Occupations: Actor; rapper; singer
- Years active: 2010–present

Tyson Coy Stewart (born June 24, 1998), also known under the stage name SWIM (formerly KOI) is an American actor, rapper, and singer. He had a role in the TBS sitcom Are We There Yet?, as Flint in the ABC superhero drama series Agents of S.H.I.E.L.D., Marcus in the PBS Kids Go! series The Electric Company, Troy in the Nickelodeon sitcom Bella and the Bulldogs and Lorenzo in Netflix sitcom Mr. Iglesias. He voiced Benson in the Netflix animated series Kipo and the Age of Wonderbeasts.

In 2019, Stewart founded the hip-hop collective PartyOf2 (then known as Grouptherapy), alongside fellow former child actors Jadagrace, Tyrel Jackson Williams, and Elijah Johnson.

== Early life ==
Stewart was born in Columbia, South Carolina. His interest in acting began after reciting lines from popular television series. He then joined a talent agency in Columbia, DeAbreu Modeling and Consulting, before playing Travis Younger in a stage production of A Raisin in the Sun.

== Career ==
=== Acting career ===
In 2010, Stewart began his career with his role as Kevin Kingston in the TBS sitcom Are We There Yet?. In March 2011, Coy won the Young Artists Award for Best Supporting Young Actor in a Comedy or Drama for his role as Kevin in Are We There Yet?. In the same year, he played Marcus Barnes on the PBS Kids Go!-Sesame Workshop comedy edutainment sitcom, The Electric Company.

In, January 2012, Coy's father, Derek Stewart, published a non-fiction book titled The Unlikely Journey that chronicles Coy's journey into the entertainment business.

He played the role of Troy Dixon in the Nickelodeon series Bella and the Bulldogs. He starred as Xavier in the 2016 comedy horror web series WTH: Welcome to Howler. In August 2017, Coy Stewart played the primary role in the music video and short film of the song "1-800-273-8255" by rapper Logic which deals with the issues of homosexuality and suicide. In November 2017, it was announced that Stewart had been cast in Agents of S.H.I.E.L.D. as a young Inhuman called Flint. In late 2018, Stewart was cast in a recurring role on the Netflix sitcom Mr. Iglesias.

=== Musical career ===
Stewart, along with friend Tyrel Jackson Williams and Jadagrace, formed the music collective "PartyOf2" (formerly known as Grouptherapy when formed until 2024) On April 1, 2020, the collective released their debut EP entitled this is not the album. and later released their debut mixtape, there goes the neighborhood. on October 30, 2020. The trio released their debut album, "I Was Mature for my Age, But I Was Still a Child" on June 27, 2023.

== Filmography ==
=== Film ===
Year	Title	Role	Notes
2015	Jingle Hit Factory: Detention	Devin	Short
2015	Throwing Snowballs	Troy	Short
2015	Christian	Christian	Short
2017	Devil's Whisper	Gavin	
2017	Deadly Detention	Kevin	
2017	House Of The Witch	Dax	
2018	The Judgment of Kyle Noble	Malik Martin	Short

=== Television ===
Year	Title	Role	Notes
2010	The Glades	Declan	Episode: "Mucked Up"
2010–2013	Are We There Yet?	Kevin Kingston-Persons	Main role
2011	The Electric Company	Marcus Barnes	Main role (season 3)
2013	Good Luck Charlie	Warren	Episode: "The Bug Prom"
2015	Nickelodeon's Ho Ho Holiday Special	Himself	
2015–2016	Bella and the Bulldogs	Troy Dixon	Main cast
2016	NCIS	Brandon Conway	Episode: "Home of the Brave"
2016–present	WTH: Welcome to Howler	Xavier	Main role
2017	House of the Witch	Dax	Television movie
2017–2020	Agents of S.H.I.E.L.D.	Flint	Recurring role
2019	The Blacklist	Vontae Jones	Recurring role
2019–2020	Mr. Iglesias	Lorenzo	Recurring role
2020	Kipo and the Age of Wonderbeasts	Benson	Main voice role
2022	Grey's Anatomy	College Roommate	Episode: "Wasn't Expecting That"
2022	Family Reunion	Godz Sun	Episode: "Remember the New Addition to the Family?"

=== Music video ===
Year	Title	Artist
2017	"1-800-273-8255"	Logic ft. Alessia Cara, Khalid
