= Jadagrace =

American actress, dancer, and singer (born 1999)

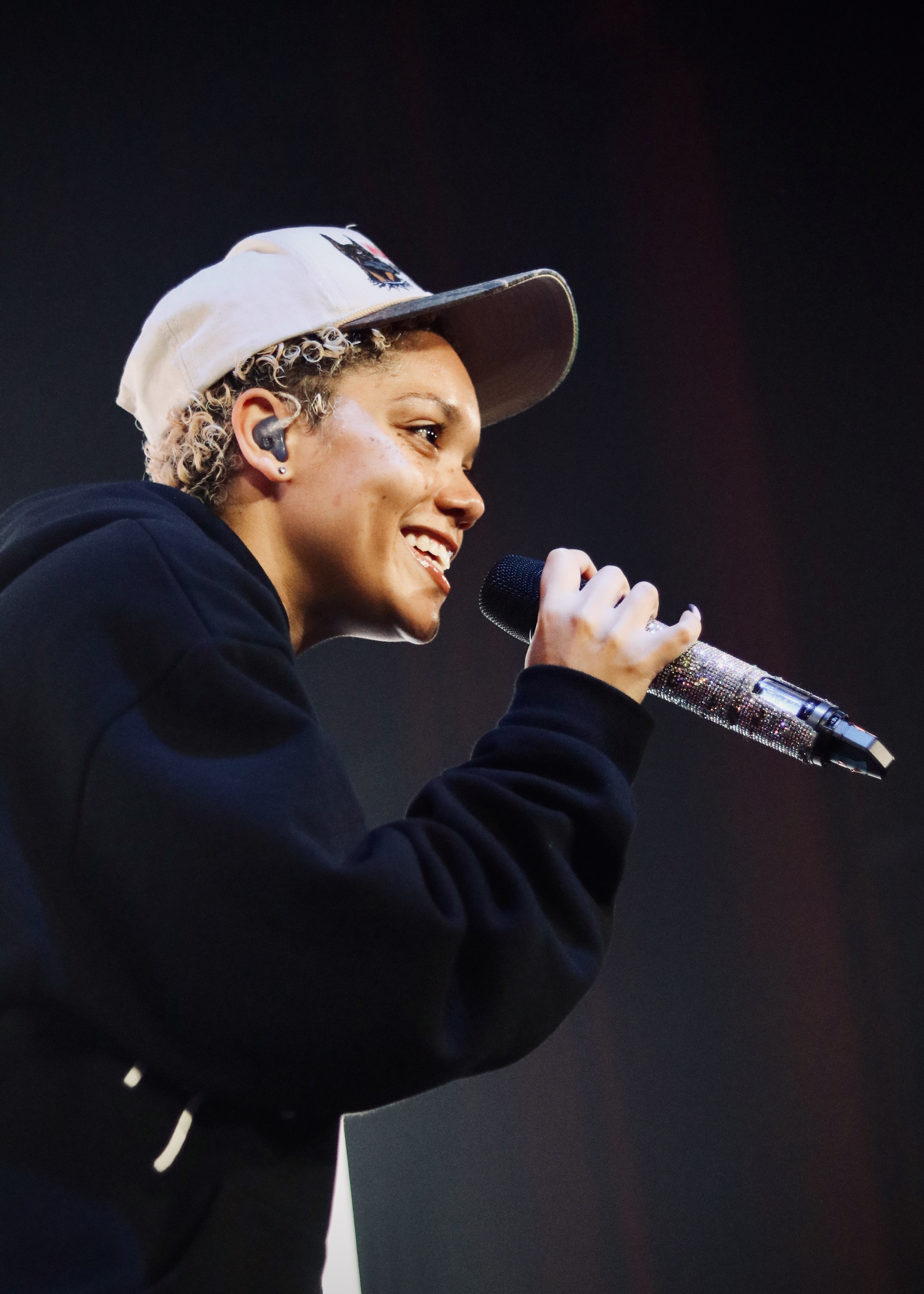
- Born: Jadagrace Michiko Gordy-Nash; September 1, 1999 (age 27)
- Other name: Jadagrace Berry
- Occupations: Actress; dancer; singer; rapper
- Years active: 2008–present

Jadagrace Michiko Gordy-Nash (born September 1, 1999), known mononymously as Jadagrace, is an American actress, dancer, singer, and rapper. She appeared in the 2009 film, Terminator Salvation. Her song "Express Yourself" was released as a single when she was nine years old. She was signed to a record deal in 2012 after being discovered by Redfoo of LMFAO, and released her first single "Run Dat Back" under the Epic Records music label.

In 2019, Jadagrace founded the hip-hop collective Grouptherapy (now PartyOf2), alongside fellow child actors Coy Stewart, Tyrel Jackson Williams, and Elijah Johnson.

== Early life ==
Jadagrace was born to a Japanese-American mother and African-American father. She got her start as a dancer when she was 5 years old, dancing at the Debbie Allen Dance Academy.

== Acting career ==
Jadagrace had her first acting credit for Three Versus, a 2008 short film where she played the character Bitsy Mott. Her first major role came in 2009 when she landed the role of Star in the movie Terminator Salvation. In 2012, Cookie Jar Entertainment began production on The Jadagrace Show, a series about a 12-year-old girl who gets her own television show after a video she uploaded on the Internet goes viral.

=== Filmography ===
Year	Title	Role	Medium
2008	Three Verses	Bitsy Mott	Short Film
2009	Terminator Salvation	Star	Movie
2012–2013	The Jadagrace Show	Jadagrace	Television Series

== Music career ==
Jadagrace recorded her first song, "Express Yourself", when she was nine years old. She was discovered for her music by Redfoo of LMFAO. She signed a deal with Epic Records and released her first single, "Run Dat Back" in 2012.

In 2015, she signed a record deal with Capitol Motown and released her first single titled "Vibe" in July 2016.

After leaving her record label, Jadagrace, along with friend Tyrel Jackson Williams and Coy Stewart formed the music collective "Grouptherapy". In November 2019, Jadagrace released her first single as part of grouptherapy. titled "Bounce". On April 1, 2020, the collective released their debut EP entitled this is not the album. The collective later released their debut mixtape, there goes the neighborhood. on October 30, 2020.
