= Tip Toland =

American ceramic artist (born 1950)

Tip Toland (born May 9, 1950) is an American ceramic artist and teacher.

Toland was born in Pottstown, Pennsylvania and attended Swarthmore High School. She earned a Bachelor of Fine Arts in Ceramics from the University of Colorado Boulder and a Master of Fine Arts in Ceramics from Montana State University. Her works, which are figurative and often described as "hyper-real," are held by galleries and museums around the United States.

Toland's early works were wall reliefs in wood, clay and pigment. Her more recent three-dimensional stoneware sculptures are close to life size, sometimes larger. She uses paint, encaustic technique and hair to create figures with "uncanny skin quality, utterly convincing hand gestures and eerily spontaneous facial expressions."

== Career ==
In 1984 Toland moved to Seattle. Her various teaching positions have included Louisiana State University, the University of Washington, the University of Montana, and Montana State University; she has taught workshops around the U.S. and abroad.

Toland's 2014 exhibit titled "The Persecution of People with Albinism in Tanzania" at the Portland Art Museum included sculptures of children and teens with albinism, drawing attention to prejudice and other dangers faced by those with albinism in some East African countries.

In 2016, she was the Frances Niederer Artist-in-Residence at Hollins University's Eleanor D. Wilson Museum.

Tip Toland is currently represented by the Traver Gallery in Seattle.

== Selected exhibitions ==
=== Group exhibitions ===
- 2013-2014: Body & Soul: New International Ceramics, Museum of Arts & Design, New York

=== Solo exhibitions ===
- 2007: Pacini Lubel Gallery
- 2008 - 2009: Melt: The Figure in Clay, Bellevue Arts Museum, Bellevue, Washington (catalog)
- 2014: Apex: Tip Toland, Portland Art Museum, Portland, Oregon.

== Collections ==
Works by Toland are held by galleries and museums including the Metropolitan Museum of Art (New York), the Museum of Arts and Design (New York), Herberger Institute for Design and the Arts (Arizona State University), Yellowstone Art Museum (Billings, Montana), Daum Museum of Contemporary Art (Sedalia, Missouri), and the Archie Bray Foundation (Helena, Montana).

== Awards ==
Toland received a Visual Arts Fellowship from the National Endowment for the Arts in 1986. She also received a Virginia A. Groot Foundation Award in 2004 and a fellowship from Washington State's Artist Trust in 2007. In 2014, she was awarded a United States Artist Fellowship.
