= Do It Like You =

Song by Diggy Simmons

Single by Diggy Simmons featuring Jeremih

from the album Unexpected Arrival
- Released: October 24, 2011
- Recorded: 2011
- Genre: Hip hop; R&B
- Length: 3:53
- Label: Atlantic
- Songwriters: Diggy Simmons; Jeremih Felton; John Maultsby; McGee; Andrew "Pop" Wansel; Dexter Wansel
- Producer: Pop & Oak

Diggy Simmons singles chronology
"Mrs. Right" (2011)	"Do It Like You" (2011)	"4 Letter Word" (2012)

Jeremih singles chronology
"I Don't Deserve You" (2011)	"Do It Like You" (2011)	"Amen" (2012)

"Do It Like You" is a song by American rapper Diggy Simmons with a guest appearance from R&B singer Jeremih singing the chorus. It was released on October 24, 2011, as the second single from his debut album Unexpected Arrival (2012). It was co-written by both artists, along with John Maultsby, McGee, Dexter Wansel, and Andrew "Pop" Wansel, who co-produced the song with producer Oak Felder. The song uses a sample of "Theme From the Planets" by Dexter Wansel.

"Do It Like You" was Diggy's first solo appearance on the US Billboard Hot 100, peaking at number 80. It also peaked at number 11 on both the US Hot R&B/Hip-Hop Songs and US Hot Rap Songs charts. A music video directed by Phil the God was created for the single that featured both Diggy and Jeremih with their respective girlfriends at a carnival.

== Background ==
"Do It Like You" was written by Diggy Simmons, Jeremih Felton, John Maultsby, McGee, Andrew "Pop" Wansel (who co-produced the song with producer Oak), and Dexter Wansel, whose song "Theme From the Planets" was used as a sample. Billboard editor Jon Blistein described the song as having "sugar-rushed synths and bubblegum snap snares." In an interview with music channel Fuse, he said that his inspiration for the song was about a girl being true to herself and not emulating someone else to attract a guy.

== Music video ==
A video (directed by frequent collaborator Phil the God) was created for the single that took place in California. The video features both Diggy and Jeremih hanging out with friends when they spot a group of girls walking past them. Diggy is attracted to one of them, and they have a date at a carnival. The video premiered on BET's 106 & Park on December 6, 2011.

== Track listing ==
No.	Title	Writer(s)	Producer(s)	Length
1.	"Do It Like You" (featuring Jeremih)	Diggy Simmons, Jeremih Felton, John Maultsby, McGee, Andrew "Pop" Wansel, Dexter Wansel	Pop & Oak	3:53

== Chart performance ==
On the week of February 11, 2012, "Do It Like You" debuted on the Billboard Hot 100 at number 99. It moved two spots to number 97 the week of February 25 before leaving the chart. It reappeared on the chart at number 98 for the week of March 17 and peaked at number 80 the week of April 7, staying on the chart for eight weeks.

=== Weekly charts ===
Chart (2011–2012)	Peak position
US Billboard Hot 100	80
US Hot R&B/Hip-Hop Songs (Billboard)	11
US Hot Rap Songs (Billboard)	11
US Rhythmic Airplay (Billboard)	24

=== Year-end charts ===
Chart (2012)	Position
US Hot R&B/Hip-Hop Songs (Billboard)	54
