= Copy, Paste =

Single by Diggy Simmons

from the album Unexpected Arrival
- Released: May 29, 2011
- Recorded: 2011
- Genre: Hip hop
- Length: 2:55
- Label: Atlantic
- Songwriters: Diggy Simmons; Warren "Oak" Felder; John Maultsby; Andrew "Pop" Wansel
- Producer: Pop & Oak

Diggy Simmons singles chronology
"Yeah Right" (2011)	"Copy, Paste" (2011)	"Mrs. Right" (2011)

Music video
- "Copy, Paste" on YouTube

"Copy, Paste" is a song by American rapper Diggy Simmons. It was written by Simmons, Warren "Oak" Felder, John Maultsby and Andrew "Pop" Wansel, who co-produced the song with producer Oak Felder. It was posted on Atlantic's SoundCloud page and released as the debut single on May 29, 2011. It was later included as a bonus track on the deluxe version of his debut album Unexpected Arrival (2012). Lyrically, it is a hip hop song about being true to one's self and telling off people trying to "copy and paste" them.

"Copy, Paste" peaked at numbers 21 and 24 on the US Hot Rap Songs and US Hot R&B/Hip-Hop Songs charts respectively. A music video, directed by Phil the God, was created for the single that features Diggy tied up as a laboratory experiment for scientists to clone.

== Development and release ==
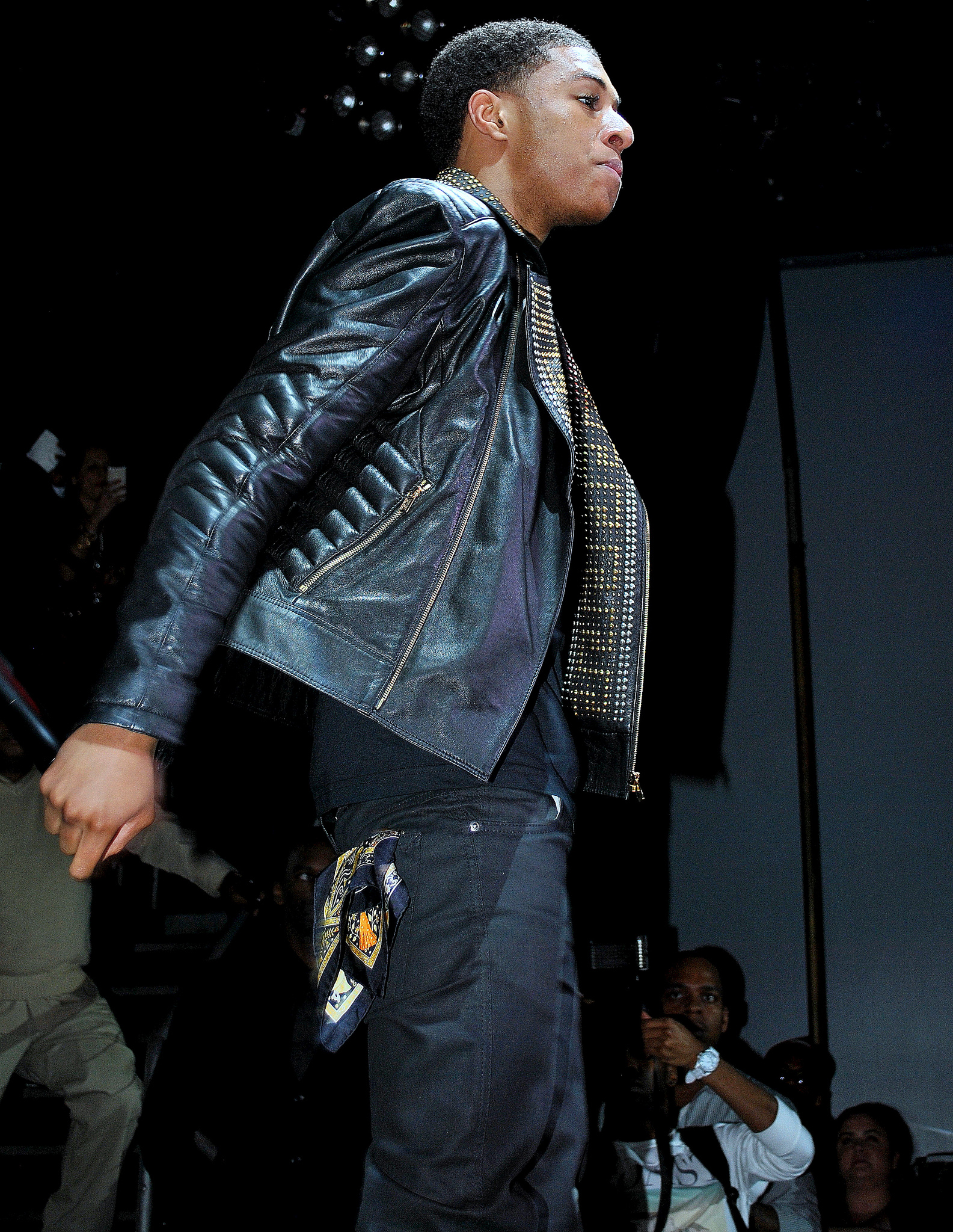
Diggy explained that the song is an anthem for innovators.

"Copy, Paste" was written by Simmons, Warren Felder, John Maultsby and Andrew "Pop" Wansel, who co-produced the song with producer Oak. In an interview with MTV, Diggy explained that the song was for people who stayed true to themselves: "'Copy, Paste' is just for people that are original, people that are innovators, people that just do their own thing," he said. "I feel as though that I’m a person like that myself, so just making a theme song or an anthem for people that are like that."

On May 26, 2011, the artwork for the single premiered on the artist's official website. The song premiered online via Atlantic Records' SoundCloud page on May 27, 2011. It was then released as the debut single on May 29, 2011. It was later included as a bonus track on the deluxe version of his debut album Unexpected Arrival.

== Music video ==
A video was created for the single that took place in Los Angeles around mid-July 2011. The video was directed by Phil the God (also known as Phil Da God), a frequent collaborator that Diggy often worked with: "It just feels right: We have a great connection. We’ll hop on the phone and talk about ideas, the things I want to do, the things he wants to do, and just get hyped off of each other’s energy, and the best will come out of that."

The video features Diggy tied up as a laboratory experiment (covered in electrodes and a large bandage around his stomach), being watched by scientists who want to make a clone of him. The clone goes through an audio test that causes a short circuit in the laboratory. The video ends with Diggy backed up by dancers while the lights flicker around them. Intercut are close-ups of Diggy while an interface surrounds him. The video was first released on iTunes on July 15, 2011. It was then uploaded on the artist's YouTube page on July 29, 2011.

== Track listing ==
No.	Title	Writer(s)	Producer(s)	Length
1.	"Copy, Paste"	Diggy Simmons, Warren "Oak" Felder, Andrew "Pop" Wansel, John Maultsb	Pop & Oak	2:55

== Chart performance ==
Chart (2011)	Peak position
US Hot R&B/Hip-Hop Songs (Billboard)	24
US Hot Rap Songs (Billboard)	21
