= Bellevue Arts Museum =

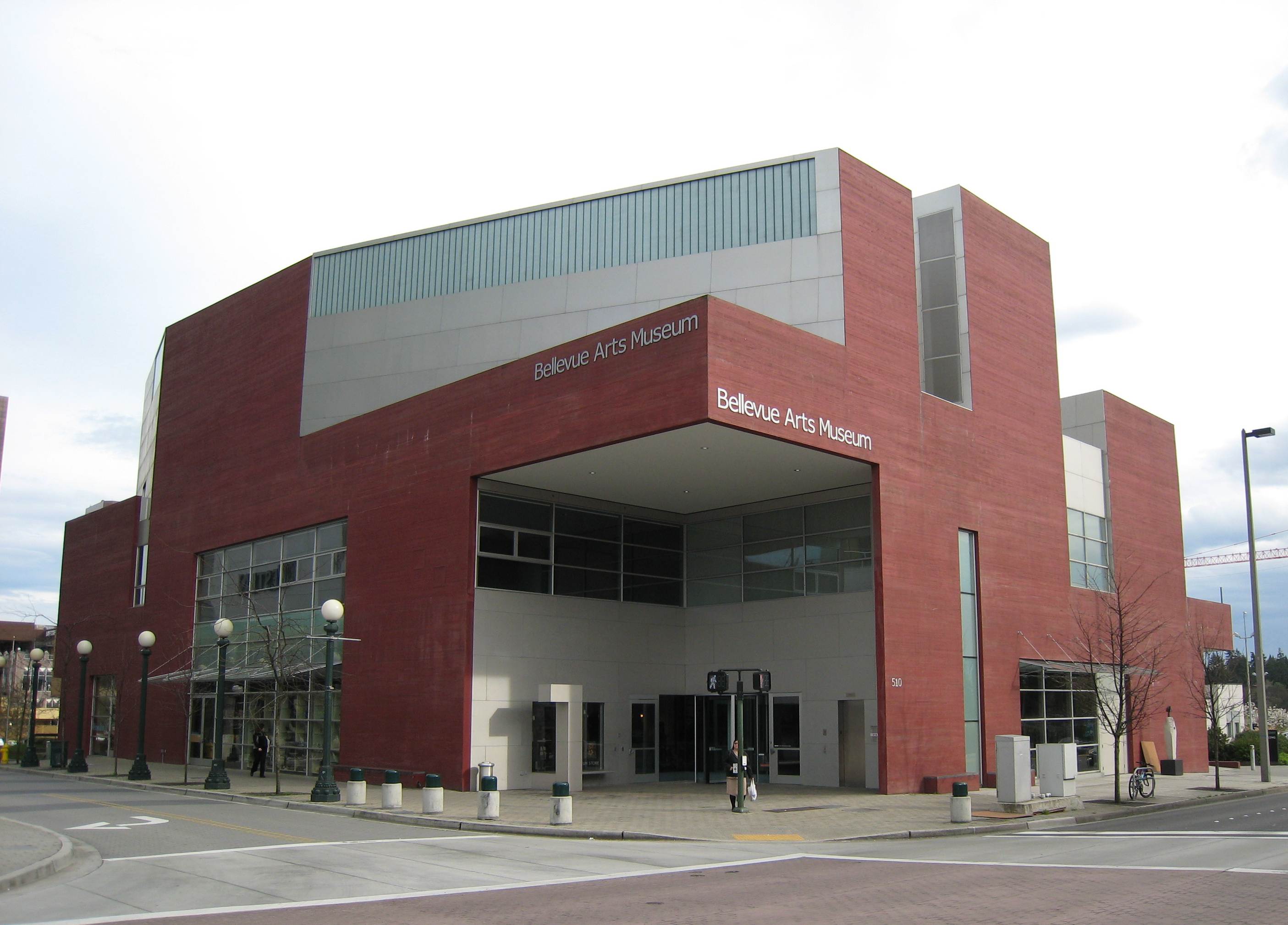
- Bellevue Arts Museum (BAM) in 2007

- Location within Washington (state)
- Established: 1975
- Location: 3000 Landerholm Circle SE; Bellevue, Washington; United States
- Coordinates: 47.584°N 122.150°W
- Type: Art museum
- Executive director: E. Michael Whittington
- Architect: Steven Holl
- Website: bellevuearts.org

The Bellevue Arts Museum is a nonprofit organization and former museum space dedicated to contemporary visual art, craft, and design located in Bellevue, Washington, part of the greater Seattle metropolitan area. A nonprofit organization established in 1975, the Bellevue Arts Museum (BAM) provided rotating arts exhibitions to the public until the closure of its museum space on September 4, 2024, amid financial issues. The museum was located across from Bellevue Square in a three-story building opened in 2001 and designed by architect Steven Holl.

== History ==
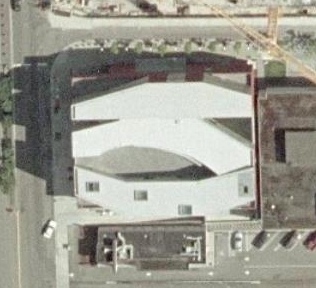
USGS overhead image of the Bellevue Arts Museum

The museum traces its roots back to street fair art in 1947 as the Pacific Northwest Arts and Crafts Association. The group established itself more formally as a nonprofit organization in 1975. After several temporary locations, it moved to the third floor of Bellevue Square, a large shopping center in the center of downtown Bellevue, Washington in 1983. In 2001, the museum began providing programming in its own building. The distinctive new building was designed by noted architect Steven Holl. It is seen by many residents of Bellevue as playing a role in the transformation of the downtown from series of suburban strip malls to a sophisticated city with a variety of cultural attractions.

The museum subsequently ran into financial difficulties and was forced to close to the public in September 2003. After a successful $3 million fundraising campaign and extensive interior remodeling, the museum re-opened on June 18, 2005, with a revised mission focused on art, craft and design and with an emphasis on Northwest artists.

In contrast to conventional art museums, Bellevue Arts Museum has no permanent collection. Rather, it emphasizes education and hands-on involvement through an extensive selection of classes and workshops. Since the late 2010s BAM has been locally recognized for holding unique and high quality exhibitions by artists from the Pacific Northwest.

During the COVID-19 pandemic, the Bellevue Arts Museum provided over 7,000 arts and crafts kits to children and community members to use at home. Since the onset of the pandemic, the museum has had several funding crises due to its rising debt, small number of contributors, and reliance on revenue from traveling events that were unable to open in 2020 and 2021. In February 2024, the Bellevue Arts Museum began an emergency fundraising campaign that raised $349,000 to maintain its operations. On September 4, the museum announced its indefinite closure due to the funding shortfall; the BAM Arts Fair continues to be held each year.

In October 2025, the museum announced that it would sell the building and land to the KidsQuest Children's Museum, a Bellevue-based children's museum that focuses on STEM education. The Bellevue Arts Museum plans to move their collections into a new physical location and primarily focus on hosting the annual BAM Arts Fair. The museum exited receivership in June 2026 and announced their plans to move their offices onto the Bellevue College campus. The move to a temporary building on campus was completed on September 18, 2026. BAM provides workshops, internships, and volunteer opportunities to students and supports the existing galleries on campus.

== Exhibitions ==
The Bellevue Arts Museum has offered a broad range of exhibitions across visual design, contemporary craft, and fine art. Exhibitions have included works from architect Louis Kahn (2016), cartoonist Simon Hanselmann (2019), contemporary wood sculptor Humaria Abid (2017), and Tariqa Waters (2020, 2021). Since 2010, the Bellevue Arts Museum has held the BAM Biennial, a survey of artwork in a specific medium such as glass, fiber, wood, or ceramic. The museum has curated solo exhibitions of several contemporary ceramic sculptors including Tip Toland (2008) and Patti Warashina (2013).

== Management, programs and events ==
From 2004 until 2008, Michael Monroe served as the Bellevue Arts Museum's director. Stefano Catalani held the role of director of art, craft, and design at BAM starting in 2010. BAM appointed Benedict Heywood the executive director on September 18, 2017. Heywood left the organization in March 2021, and Leigh Ann More was appointed as interim executive director in April 2021. In February 2022, E. Michael Whittington was named the museum's executive director.
