= Number 1 Girl =

#1 Girl

Studio album by Mindless Behavior
- Released: September 20, 2011
- Genre: R&B; pop; hip hop
- Length: 37:56
- Label: Interscope; Streamline
- Producer: Boi-1da; Jukebox; Walter Millsap III; Candice Nelson

Mindless Behavior chronology
#1 Girl (2011)	All Around the World (2013)

Singles from #1 Girl
- 1. "My Girl" Released: August 24, 2010; 2. "Mrs. Right" Released: June 28, 2011; 3. "Girls Talkin' Bout" Released: November 1, 2011; 4. "Hello" Released: March 8, 2012

#1 Girl is the debut studio album by American boy band Mindless Behavior. It was released on September 20, 2011, by Interscope Records and Streamline Records.

The album debuted and peaked at number seven on the US Billboard 200, with first-week sales of 36,000 copies in the United States. By March 2013, it had sold 290,000 copies domestically.

== Singles ==
The album's lead single, titled "My Girl" was released on August 24, 2010. The song was Record production, and was written by Walter Millsap III and Candice Nelson. The song charted at number 16 on the US Hot R&B/Hip-Hop Songs chart. The remix to "My Girl", which features guest vocals from Young Money rapper Tyga and his label-mate Lil Twist, along with the American singer-songwriter Ciara.

The album's second single, titled "Mrs. Right", which features guest vocals from American rapper Diggy Simmons, was released on June 28, 2011. The song charted on the US Billboard Hot 100 at number 72 and on the US R&B/Hip-Hop Songs chart at number eight. The remix of "Mrs. Right" features guest vocals from UK's rapper Chipmunk. The video for the remix was added to VEVO. It is the same one as the original, except it was edited to completely omit the verse by Diggy Simmons and its intro, however, Chipmunk does not make the appearance in the video.

The album's third single, "Girls Talkin' Bout" was released on November 1, 2011. The song charted at number 50 on the US Hot R&B/Hip-Hop Songs chart.

The album's fourth single, "Hello" was released on March 8, 2012.

== Critical reception ==
Professional ratings
Review scores
Source	Rating
AllMusic	3.5/5 stars

AllMusic editor Andy Kellman rated the album three and a half stars ouf of five. He described #1 Girl as "an album full of age-appropriate pop-R&B that doesn't get much more suggestive than "We 'bout to get acquainted now." It’s all decent, high gloss material that, sonically, fits into mainstream R&B/rap radio playlists circa 2011 without making parents shudder." Jon Caramanica from The New York Times called the project an "energized and often invigorating debut album." He noted that "most of the singing is done by Prodigy, who has the slickness of Usher in his pre-pubescent yearsv [...] These trills of post-Bieber manchild love are produced almost entirely by Walter W. Milsap III and Candice Nelson, who keep their dance-floor R&B; fleet and optimistic."

== Commercial performance ==
#1 Girl debuted at number seven on the US Billboard 200 and number two on the Top R&B/Hip-Hop Albums chart with first-week sales of 36,000 copies. By March 2013, the album had sold 290,000 copies, while spinning off sales of more than 5.5 million ringtones, 845,000 singles and over 160 million views on YouTube.

== Track listing ==
#1 Girl track listing
No.	Title	Producer(s)	Length
1.	"Intro" (Spoken: Mindless Behavior)		0:33
2.	"#1 Girl" (Lead Vocal: Prodigy)	Walter Millsap III; Candice Nelson; Marcus De'Andre Walker^{[a]}	3:31
3.	"Hello" (Lead Vocal: Prodigy)	Millsap; Nelson	3:34
4.	"My Girl" (Lead Vocal: Prodigy/Rap: Roc Royal)	Millsap; Nelson; Walker^{[a]}	4:00
5.	"Uh-Oh" (Lead Vocals: Prodigy)	Millsap; Nelson	3:19
6.	"Hook It Up" (Lead Vocal: Prodigy/Rap: Roc Royal)	Millsap; Nelson; Walker^{[a]}	4:11
7.	"Missing You" (Lead Vocal: Prodigy/Spoken: Prodigy and Roc Royal)	Millsap; Nelson	3:43
8.	"Future" (Lead Vocal: Prodigy)	Boi-1da; Millsap^{[a]}	3:24
9.	"Gone" (Lead Vocal: Prodigy and Roc Royal)	Millsap; Nelson	3:23
10.	"Girls Talkin' Bout" (Lead Vocal: Prodigy)	Jukebox; Millsap^{[a]}	3:22
11.	"Mrs. Right" (featuring Diggy Simmons) (Lead Vocal: Prodigy/ Rap: Diggy Simmons/Spoken: Princeton)	Millsap; Nelson; Gregory Watts^{[a]}; Nathaniel Williams^{[a]}; John Millsap^{[a]}	4:08

Deluxe edition (bonus tracks)
No.	Title	Length
12.	"I Love You" (Lead Vocals: Prodigy)
13.	"Kissing Games (I Can't Get Enough)" (Lead Vocals: Prodigy)

== Personnel ==
Performers and musicians

- Craig Crippen Jr.
- Chresanto August
- Rayan Lopez
- Jacob Perez
- Boi-1da – Bass, Drums
- Candice "Goldie" Nelson – Vocals
- Diggy Simmons – Rap
- DJ Break – Percussion
- Jerry Williams – Guitar
- Matthew Burnett – Bass, Keyboards
- Walter Millsap – Vocals
- Walter W. Millsap III – Vocals
- DJ Soundwave – Personal DJ

Technical

- Aaron Miller – Assistant Engineer
- Alex Teamer – Producer, Programming, Sequencing & Editing
- Anthony Saleh – Management
- Boi-1da – Producer, Programming, Sequencing & Editing
- Candice "Goldie" Nelson – Composer, producer
- Chris Galland – Assistant
- Cliff Feiman – Producer
- Dana Hammond – Producer, Programming, Sequencing & Editing
- Dave "Diz Mix" Lopez – Assistant Engineer
- Dave Hyman – Assistant Engineer
- Dave Russell – Mix Engineer
- Erik Madrid – Assistant, engineer, Mixing
- Gregory "Yung Billionaire" Watts – Producer, Programming, Sequencing & Editing
- John "Styles Amillie" Millsap – Producer, Programming, Sequencing & Editing
- Jukebox – Producer, Programming, Sequencing & Editing
- Kam Sangha – Producer
- Kenneth Crear – Management
- Kevin McCall Jr. – Composer
- Keisha R. Gamble – Composer, Management
- Lamar Van-Sciver – Composer, producer, Programming, Sequencing & Editing
- M. Samuels – Composer
- Manny Marroquin – Mixing
- Marcus De'Andre Walker – Composer, producer, Programming, Sequencing & Editing
- Matthew Burnett – Producer
- Nathaniel Williams – Producer, Programming, Sequencing & Editing
- Nelson Jackson III – Producer, Programming, Sequencing & Editing
- P. "J. Que" Smith – Composer
- Staci Yamano – Management
- Troy Carter – Management
- Vincent Herbert – Executive Producer
- Vito Orlando – Recording Engineer
- Walter W. Millsap III – Arranger, Assistant Engineer, composer, Executive Producer, Management, producer, Producer – Vocals, Programming, Sequencing & Editing, Recording Engineer

== Charts ==
=== Weekly charts ===
Weekly chart performance for #1 Girl
Chart (2011)	Peak position
US Billboard 200	7
US Top R&B/Hip-Hop Albums (Billboard)	2

=== Year-end charts ===
2011 year-end chart performance for #1 Girl
Chart (2011)	Position
US Top R&B/Hip-Hop Albums (Billboard)	65

2012 year-end chart performance for #1 Girl
Chart (2012)	Position
US Billboard 200	196
US Top R&B/Hip-Hop Albums (Billboard)	36

== Release history ==
Release history and formats for #1 Girl
Region	Date	Format(s)	Label	Ref.
United States	September 20, 2011	CD; digital download	Interscope; Streamline	
