= Tariqa Waters =

Artist from Houston, Texas, US (b. 1978)

- Born: 1980 (age 45–46); Richmond, Virginia
- Occupations: Artist; Curator; Author; director of Martyr Sauce Pop Art Museum
- Style: Installation art
- Website: martyrsauce.com

Tariqa Waters (born 1980) is a contemporary artist, author, curator, and community leader, renowned for her unique “pop maximalist” aesthetic. Her installations and tableaux command space dissect Black popular culture beyond the Western canon. She uses storytelling with cleverly placed anachronisms to unravel the contradictions and dualities inherent in vices rooted in Americana-distorted memories and tall tales.

== Early life and education ==
Waters was born in Richmond, Virginia. During her high school years, from 1997 to 1998, she was a Posse Member on BET’s (Black Entertainment Television) hit show “Teen Summit.” Waters attended Florida A&M University, where she pursued her higher education. Waters has lived in various locations throughout her life, including Washington, D.C., Atlanta, Georgia, Seattle, Washington and Sicily. Tariqa Waters is a hybrid-trained artist.

== Career ==
Her artwork has been exhibited in numerous prestigious museums and galleries and featured in publications such as Rolling Stone France, Madame Figaro, Artsy, and Dazed Magazine. Celebrated as one of Seattle Magazine’s Most Influential Artists, Waters has received numerous accolades, including the 2016 Conductive Garboil Grant, the Artist Trust Fellowship Award (2018), the Kayla Skinner Special Recognition Award (2020), the Gary Glant Special Recognition Award (2021), The Neddy at Cornish Open Medium Award (2020), the Arts Innovator Award (2023), and The first Black woman to receive the Seattle Art Museum’s Betty Bowen Award (2023).

“Venus is Missing” is a solo exhibition by artist Tariqa Waters, held at the Seattle Art Museum from 2025 to 2026. The exhibition showcases an immersive collection of blown glass sculptures that explore retro-Afrofuturism, a cultural aesthetic that combines elements of science fiction, historical fiction, fantasy, and Afrocentrism. The artist, who completed a residency at the Museum of Glass, utilizes childhood artifacts as a foundation to reimagine them as cosmic technology, inviting viewers to engage with themes of identity, memory, and the future.

Tariqa Waters, known for her innovative approach to art, completed a residency at the Museum of Glass, which significantly influenced her work in this exhibition. In “Venus is Missing,” Waters employs childhood artifacts as a foundational element, transforming them into representations of cosmic technology. This reimagining invites viewers to explore complex themes of identity, memory, and the future, engaging with the artwork on both a personal and speculative level. The exhibition not only highlights Waters’ distinctive artistic style but also contributes to the broader discourse on cultural identity and technological imagination.

Beyond visual art, Waters contributes as a writer and arts advice columnist for Public Display Arts Magazine’s “Ask, MS PAM.” In 2025, she published her debut book, “Who Raised You? A Martyr Sauce Guide to Etiquette,” a hybrid monograph and memoir providing insights into her artistic philosophy and personal journey. This book is now housed in libraries such as the New York Public Library, Seattle Public Library, Seattle Art Museum Library, Stanford University, Green Library, Museum of the African Diaspora, and the Metropolitan Museum of Art’s Watson Library.

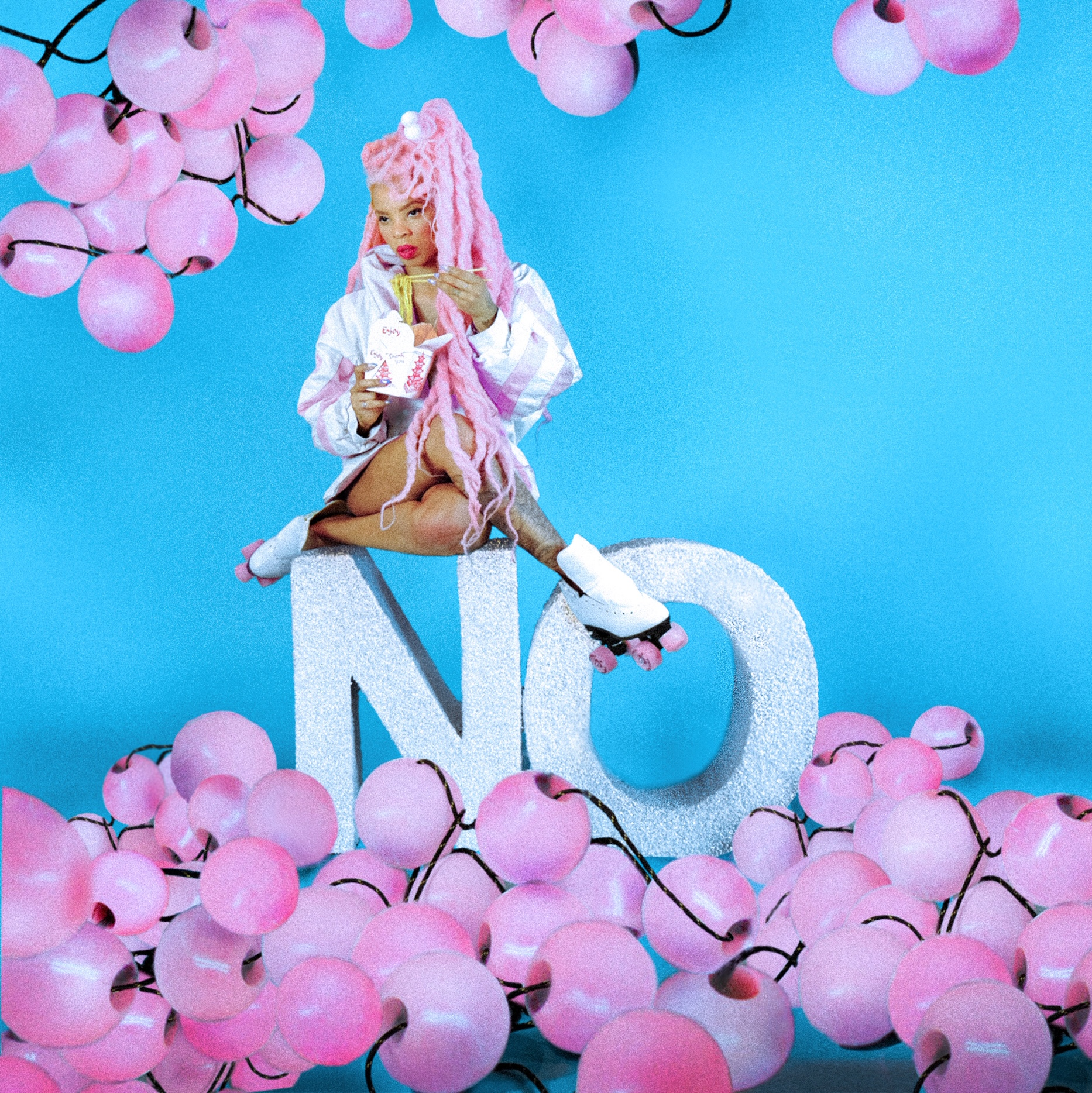
2019 NO series in conjunction with The Seattle Art Museum.

In 2012, she founded Martyr Sauce in Seattle’s Pioneer Square, a groundbreaking conceptual art space that evolved into a vibrant cultural hub. This Black-owned, women-led center served as a gallery, performing arts venue, and beauty supply store, further expanding its influence with the launch of MS PAM (Martyr Sauce Pop Art Museum) in 2020.

Martyr Sauce became a neighborhood landmark with its unique crosswalk in Seattle’s historic Pioneer Square, garnering nationwide recognition through collaborations and curatorial projects with various esteemed institutions. Her 2025-2026 commissions with the WNBA Seattle Storm include new merchandise, six crosswalks, and a wrap-around mural for The Seattle Storm Foundation. In 2015, along with Jonathan Moore, she founded RE: DEFINITION, a gallery at the Paramount Theater bar.

Her solo exhibition, 100% Kanekalon: The Untold Story of the Marginalized Matriarch, opened at the Northwest African American Museum in Seattle in 2016.

Waters, curated a group exhibition called Yellow Number 5 at the Bellevue Arts Museum (BAM), in Bellevue, Washington, held in 2020 and 2021. Waters succeeded in removing Executive Director Benedict Heywood and holding BAM's board and staff accountable for their racism and other intersectional systems of oppression.

In 2020 Waters’ exhibition Yellow No.5 debuted at the Bellevue Arts Museum.

Her five-room blown-glass immersive installation, Gum Baby, opened at the Museum of Museums in fall 2022. In the summer of 2023 Waters' large scale installation "4th Sunday" exhibited at the Seattle Art Fair and Art on Paper New York.

In 2022, Waters transformed Martyr Sauce into “Thank You, MS PAM,” a television series inspired by a short film that was acclaimed at festivals such as the Brooklyn Academy of Music’s Film Festival. It has since been developed into an episodic series aired on The Seattle Channel KCTS 9, a PBS affiliate.
