= Humaira Abid =

Pakistan-born contemporary artist

Humaira Abid is a contemporary artist who was born in Pakistan. The main element she works with is wood. Her recent work combines traditional miniature painting with wood sculpture. Her work examines women's roles, relationships, and taboos from a cross-cultural perspective.

== Background ==
Humaira Abid is based in Seattle but was born in Pakistan. She moved to the Pacific Northwest in 2008. Much of her miniature paintings and wood work is based on her focus of refugee women, women in general, and their struggles. She grew up in an area in Pakistan where it was considered unspeakable to discuss periods, puberty, and the natural processes of women's bodies. It was her goal to set out and normalize these things so women don't feel ashamed of themselves and what they can't physically control.

== Awards and exhibitions ==
Abid's work has been exhibited and published internationally. Her work has been reviewed by the Seattle Times, the Stranger, KUOW Public Radio, and the Seattle Weekly. She has appeared in the Stranger's Arts & Performances Quarterly magazine and the Huffington Post.

In 2012, Abid's installation "Breakdown in the Closet" was the winner of International Museum of Women's Community Choice Award for the MAMA: Motherhood Around the Globe exhibition. Clare Winterton, the museum's executive director, said "Humaira Abid's work is a reminder and challenge to all of us to create a world where the depth and complexity of all of our stories of women, and as mothers, can be seen, acknowledged and understood."

In 2014, she was awarded GAP funding by 4Culture and included in the "Knock on Wood" Biennial exhibition at Bellevue Arts Museum.

Abid was the subject of a short documentary, Heartwood: The Art of Humaira Abid (2014), produced and directed by Laila Kazmi. The short film aired on PBS on KCTS 9 television.

In 2019, Abid was awarded the Art Innovator Award by Artist Trust.

In 2020, Abid had a new exhibition at the Center For Art and Wood titled, "Searching for Home." The exhibition lasted through February 7, 2020 - October 3, 2020 and was curated by Jennifer-Navva Milliken.

== Selected solo exhibitions ==
- 2017 Searching for Home, Bellevue Arts Museum, Bellevue, WA
- 2016 The Dressing Room, START Saatchi Gallery, London, UK
- 2015, Khaas Art Gallery, Islamabad, Pakistan
- 2013 Featured Artist at Aaina, Seattle Asian Arts Museum, Seattle, WA
- 2011 RED, ArtXchange Gallery, Seattle, WA
- 2010 Sculptures by Humaira Abid, Chawkandi Art Gallery, Karachi, Pakistan
- 2009–10 Lullaby, Rohtasll, Lahore, Pakistan; Khaas Art, Islamabad, Pakistan; Showcase Art Gallery, Dubai, United Arab Emirates
- 2007 Love Games, Sandra Phillips Art Gallery, Denver, CO
- 2006 Inner Concerto, Canvas Art Gallery, Karachi, Pakistan
- 2004 Directions, V.M. Art Gallery, Karachi, Pakistan
- 2004 Rose Relationships, Rohtas II, Lahore and Khaas Art Gallery, Islamabad, Pakistan
- 2003 Hidden Perspectives, Rohtas II, Lahore, Pakistan

== Selected group exhibitions ==
- 2016 NW ART NOW, Tacoma Art Museum, WA
- 2016 WHY WOOD: Contemporary Practices in Timeless Material Wood, SOFAEXPO, Chicago, IL
- 2015 Exhibition by Khaas Art Gallery at ART15 London, UK
- 2015 Survey show of contemporary northwest artists, King street station, Seattle, WA
- 2015 FEAT 2015, Artist Trust Fellowship Exhibit, Galvanize, Seattle, WA
- 2015 Asian-Pacific American heritage month exhibition, Bellevue City Hall, WA
- 2014-15 Three person Show, ArtXchange Gallery, Seattle WA
- 2014-15 Knock on wood’ Biennial at Bellevue Arts Museum, WA,
- 2013-14 Installation ‘Garden of Fertility’, Seattle Municipal Tower, WA
- 2013 Women's Work: Culture and the Feminine, ArtXchange Gallery, Seattle, WA
- 2012 Celebrating Art: 30 Years of Rohtas, National Art Gallery, Islamabad, Pakistan
- 2012 Past and Present, Zahoor ul Akhlaque Gallery, National College of Arts, Pakistan
- 2010–12 in Family Unity – Unity of the World, a travelling group show in Russia and Europe
- 2010 Women and Art 2010, Sharjah Art Museum, Sharjah, United Arab Emirates
- 2009 Five Women Show, Rohtas ll, Lahore, Pakistan
- 2007 Group Exhibition, National Art Gallery, Islamabad, Pakistan
- 2007 Group Exhibition, Kuona Trust, Naivasha, Kenya
- 2005 Art For a Noble Cause Group Exhibition, Ejaz Art Gallery, Lahore, Pakistan
- 2005 Contemporary Chronicles in Miniature – Art from Pakistan and India, Art-Alive Gallery, New Delhi, India
- 2005 Group Exhibition, Sarawak Museum, Kuching, Malaysia
- 2004 Group Exhibition, Ejaz Art Gallery, Lahore, Pakistan
- 2004 Partage International Artists' Exhibition, MGI, Mauritius
- 2003 Scope X, NCA Faculty Exhibition, Zahoorul Akhlaque Gallery, Lahore, Pakistan
- 2003 Negotiating Borders : Contemporary Miniatures from Pakistan, Siddharta Art Gallery, Kathmandu, Nepal
- 2003 Group Exhibition, Canvas Gallery, Karachi, Pakistan
- 2002 Group Exhibition, Rohtas I, Islamabad, Pakistan
- 2002 Group Exhibition, Rohtas II, Lahore, Pakistan
- 2001 Group Exhibition, Gallery NCA, National College of Arts, Lahore, Pakistan
- 2001 Pun jab Artists' Association Exhibition, Lahore Arts Council, Lahore, Pakistan
- 2009 Bolivia Art Biennial, La Paz, Bolivia
- 2008 II International Wood Sculptors Symposium, Annaberg-Buchholz, Germany
- 2007 2nd International Women Artists Workshop, Kenya
- 2006 Artist in Residence, Europos Parkas, Museum of Central Europe, Lithuania
- 2005 Sculpture Symposium, Sarawak Museum, Kuching, Malaysia
- 2004 Artist in Residence, Garhi Artists' Studios, Lalitkala Academy, New Delhi, India
- 2004 Partage, International Artists Workshop, Flic en Flac, Mauritius

== Works in permanent collections ==
- Daetz Centre (Museum of Sculpture in Wood), Lichtenstein, Germany
- National Art Gallery and Museum. Islamabad, Pakistan
- Rangoon wala Trust, V.M Art Gallery, Karachi, Pakistan
- Partage Contemporary Artists Association, Mauritius
- Khas Art Gallery, Islamabad, Pakistan
- Kuona Trust International, Nairobi, Kenya
- Canvas Art Gallery, Karachi, Pakistan
- Sarawak Living Museum, Sarawak, Malaysia
