= Unexpected Arrival =

Studio album by Diggy Simmons
- Released: March 20, 2012
- Recorded: 2010–11; Various recording locations
- Genres: Hip-hop; R&B
- Length: 43:34
- Label: Atlantic
- Producers: Diggy Simmons (exec.); D'Mile (also exec.); Da Internz; Happy Perez; Osinachi Nwaneri; Pop & Oak; Soundz; The Rockstars

Diggy Simmons chronology
Unexpected Arrival (2012)	Lighten Up (2018)

Singles from Unexpected Arrival
- 1. "Copy, Paste" Released: May 29, 2011; 2. "Do It Like You" Released: October 24, 2011; 3. "4 Letter Word" Released: May 8, 2012

Unexpected Arrival is the debut studio album by American rapper Diggy Simmons. It was released on March 20, 2012, by Atlantic Records. Recording sessions took place from 2010 to 2011, at various locations, while the production on the album was handled by Da Internz, Osinachi Nwaneri, Pop & Oak, Happy Perez, and Soundz, among others.

Unexpected Arrival was supported by five singles; including three official ("Copy, Paste", "Do It Like You" and "4 Letter Word") and two promotional singles ("88" and "Two Up").

Upon the release, the album received generally positive reviews from music critics. The album debuted at number 13 on the US Billboard 200. On June 22, 2013, the album has sold 89,750 copies in the United States.

== Critical reception ==
Professional ratings
Review scores
Source	Rating
AllMusic	3.5/5 stars
HipHopDX	3.5/5 stars
XXL	4/5 stars

Upon its release, Unexpected Arrival received generally positive reviews from music critics. Christian Mordi of XXL praised the album's production and Diggy's lyrical skills for coming off more like a seasoned veteran saying, "Unlike many young artists, Diggy stays away from a lot of catchy, jingle-esque hooks and songs about trends on this project. Clearly the young MC wants to be taken seriously by casual and hardcore fans alike." AllMusic editor David Jeffries also praised the album for its production and Diggy's accessibility as a rapper concluding that, "Kid-tested and parent-approved, this well-done debut makes hating on Diggy as ridiculous as it sounds." Edwin Ortiz of HipHopDX was mixed about Diggy's talent as an emcee, singling out his age and limited view on the world for the subpar content. He concluded that, "To Diggy's credit, Unexpected Arrival plays to his adolescent strengths without hindering his opportunity to build upon his brand as an adult."

Brandon Soderberg of Spin gave credit to some of the tracks, singling out "Unforgivable Blackness" for being "a sophisticated song that actually tries to confront [Diggy] Simmons’ lack of street cred," but found the rest of the album hollow and generic and followed a formula to market an underdog rapper, saying that, "Unexpected Arrival feels like the end of the rap album. The musical narrative is executed so effectively, hitting all the requisite marks, but it doesn’t matter in the least."

== Track listing ==
No.	Title	Writer(s)	Producer(s)	Length
1.	"The Arrival (Intro)"	Diggy Simmons; Michael Jackson; Dernst Emile II	D'Mile	1:15
2.	"Hello World"	Simmons; Brandon Green; John "D.O.E." Maultsby; M. Jackson; Nathan "Happy" Pérez	Happy Perez	3:11
3.	"I Need to Know"	Simmons; Emile II; Clarence Coffee, Jr.; Alexander Izquierdo; Maultsby; Matthew Samuels	D'Mile	3:34
4.	"88" (featuring Jadakiss)	Simmons; Keith James; Jason Phillips; Shawn Carter; Lonnie Liston Smith; Nasir Jones; Peter Phillips; David Willis; Ernest Clark; Marcos Palacios	Da Internz	3:05
5.	"Two Up"	Simmons; Emile II; Coffee, Jr.; Izquierdo; Maultsby	D'Mile	3:30
6.	"Unforgivable Blackness"	Simmons; Coffee, Jr.; Maultsby; Osinachi Nwaneri	Nwaneri	4:15
7.	"Special Occasion" (featuring Tank)	Simmons; Carlos Battey; Steven Battey; Kevin Crowe; Erik Ortiz; Kenneth Bartolomei; Perry Jones; Maultsby; Durell Babbs	J.U.S.T.I.C.E. League	3:52
8.	"Glow in the Dark"	Simmons; C. Battey; S. Battey; Emile II; Maultsby	D'Mile	5:59
9.	"4 Letter Word"	Aubrey Graham; Kenneth Coby; Brian "The Rockstars" Cohen; Jacob Lutrell; Chase Lett; Chris "The Rockstars" Llewellyn; Maultsby	Soundz	3:39
10.	"Do It Like You" (featuring Jeremih)	Simmons; Jeremih Felton; Maultsby; McGee; Andrew "Pop" Wansel; Dexter Wansel; Warren "Oak" Felder	Pop & Oak	3:53
11.	"Tom Edison"	Simmons; Emile II; Izquierdo; Maultsby	D'Mile	3:32
12.	"The Reign"	Simmons; Cynthia Biggs; Sam Hook; Maultsby; A. Wansel; D. Wansel; Felder	Pop & Oak	3:59
Total length:				43:34

iTunes Store bonus track
No.	Title	Writer(s)	Producer(s)	Length
13.	"Copy, Paste"	Simmons; Felder; Maultsby; A. Wansel	Pop & Oak	2:55

Best Buy bonus tracks
No.	Title	Writer(s)	Producer(s)	Length
13.	"Knowing Me, Knowing You"
14.	"What's Going On"
15.	"MSG"	Simmons; Maultsby; Izquierdo; Coby; Llewellyn; Cohen	Soundz; The Rockstars	3:45

Sample credits

- "88" contains a sample from "Dance (A$$)" performed by Big Sean.
- "Do It Like You" contains a sample from "Theme From the Planets", written and performed by Dexter Wansel.

== Personnel ==
Credits for Unexpected Arrival adapted from AllMusic.

- John Armstrong – engineer
- Paul Bailey – engineer
- Shawn Barron – A&R
- Carlos Centel Battey – composer
- Steven Andre Battey – composer
- Cynthia Biggs – composer
- Nick Bilardello – art direction, design
- The Jackie Boyz – vocals
- Tanisha Broadwater – production coordination
- Mike Caren – A&R
- Shawn Carter – composer
- Kenneth Coby – composer
- Clarence Coffee, Jr. – composer, vocals
- Brian Cohen – composer
- Da Internz – producer
- Dernst "D'Mile" Emile – additional production, composer, executive producer, producer
- Laurie Dobbins – management
- Lanre Gaba – A&R
- Chris Galland – assistant
- Jesus Garnica – assistant
- Chris Gehringer – mastering
- Dionne Harper – marketing
- Patrick Hoelck – photography
- Sam Hook – composer, vocals
- Israel – engineer
- Alexander Izquierdo – composer
- Keith James – composer
- Jaycen Joshua – mixing
- Brandon Jones – keyboards
- Eben "Critical" Jones – engineer
- Nasir Jones – composer
- Perry Jones – composer
- John "J-Banga" Kercy – mixing
- Cara Lewis – booking
- Chris Lighty – management
- Chris Llewellyn – composer
- Daniel Luttrell – vocals
- Jacob Luttrell – composer
- Bei Maejor – composer
- Connie Makita – illustrations
- Manny Marroquin – mixing
- John Maultsby – composer
- Donnie Meadows – production coordination
- Latoya Murray-Berry – stylist
- Nathan Perez – composer
- Osinachi Nwaneri – composer, producer
- Happy Perez – Producer
- Jayson Phillips – composer
- Peter O. Phillips – composer
- The Rockstars – guitar, keyboards, producer
- Matthew Samuels – composer
- Diggy Simmons – executive producer, composer
- Skylar – engineer
- Lonnie Liston Smith – composer
- Soundz – producer
- Dexter Wansel – composer
- Pop Wansel – composer, instrumentation, producer
- David A. Willis – composer
- Cathryn Marie – publicist

== Charts ==
=== Weekly charts ===
Chart (2012)	Peak position
US Billboard 200	13
US R&B/Hip-Hop Albums (Billboard)	3
US Rap Albums (Billboard)	2

=== Year-end charts ===
Chart (2012)	Position
US R&B/Hip-Hop Albums (Billboard)	80
