= Mrs. Right =

Single by Mindless Behavior featuring Diggy Simmons

from the album #1 Girl
- Released: June 28, 2011
- Recorded: 2011
- Genre: Hip hop; R&B
- Length: 4:09
- Label: Interscope; Streamline
- Songwriters: Kai Kenzo; Mindless Behavior; Rickey Deleon; Diggy Simmons
- Producers: Walter W. Millsap; Candice "Goldie" Nelson

Mindless Behavior singles chronology
"My Girl" (2010)	"Mrs. Right" (2011)	"Girls Talkin' Bout" (2011)

Diggy Simmons singles chronology
"Copy, Paste" (2011)	"Mrs. Right" (2011)	"Do It Like You" (2011)

"Mrs. Right" is a song by American boy band Mindless Behavior featuring guest vocals from American rapper Diggy Simmons. The song was written by Mindless Behavior, Dee1, Rickey Deleon, Diggy Simmons and was produced by Walter W. Millsap, Candice "Goldie" Nelson. It was released as the second single from Mindless Behavior's debut studio album #1 Girl (2011) on June 28, 2011, by Interscope and Streamline. They were all between 13 and 15 years old in the song.

== Remixes ==
The official remix of "Mrs. Right" features UK rapper Chipmunk. The music video was released on January 13, 2012, on Polydor Records' YouTube page. The remix was released to iTunes in the UK on February 17, 2012. Also they made a remix with Lil Chuckee which is on Lil Chuckee's mixtape.

== Music video ==
The video was released on June 29, 2011, on VEVO and was directed by Brett Ratner. The video features rapper/actor LL Cool J as a geography teacher and actor Mike Epps as the school janitor. The video starts in a classroom with LL Cool J telling the students that he's gonna take them to every country, starting the song and having the girl students (each dressed from different countries) dance in front of their classmates. It then moves into a gymnasium where the boys are dancing.

There is another video which was added to VEVO that features the remix with Chipmunk. It is the same one but it completely cuts out Diggy Simmons and the intro. Chipmunk does not make an appearance, therefore it's edited with dancing scenes.

== Track listings and formats ==
US digital download

1. "Mrs. Right" (feat. Diggy Simmons) – 4:09

Remix single

1. "Mrs. Right" (feat. Chipmunk) – 4:09

UK digital download

1. "Mrs. Right" (feat. Chipmunk) – 4:09
2. "Mrs. Right" (remix) – 3:59

== Charts ==
=== Weekly charts ===
Chart (2011)	Peak position
US Billboard Hot 100	72
US Hot R&B/Hip-Hop Songs (Billboard)	8
US Rhythmic Airplay (Billboard)	31

=== Year-end charts ===
Chart (2011)	Position
US Hot R&B/Hip-Hop Songs (Billboard)	62

== Release history ==
Country	Date	Format	Label
United States	June 28, 2011	Digital download	Interscope, Streamline
United Kingdom	February 17, 2012	Digital download	Interscope
