= PartyOf2 =

American hip-hop duo

- Also known as: grouptherapy. (2019–2024); PartyOf2 (2024–present)
- Origin: Los Angeles, California, U.S.
- Genres: Hip hop; pop rap; pop
- Years active: 2019–present
- Labels: SPLITMIND; Def Jam
- Members: Swim; Jadagrace
- Past members: TJOnline; Rhea
- Website: www.partyof2.org

Partyof2 (stylized as PARTYOF2) is an American hip hop duo from Los Angeles, consisting of Swim and Jadagrace. Originally founded in 2019 as Grouptherapy (stylized as grouptherapy.) by Swim, Jadagrace, TJOnline, and Rhea, the group rebranded following the departures of Rhea and TJOnline in 2020 and 2024, respectively. The group's debut studio album, I Was Mature For My Age, But I Was Still A Child, was released on June 27, 2023 after a series of EPs and a mixtape.

== History ==
=== 2019–2022: Founding and early projects ===
Grouptherapy's members originally met due to their shared background as child entertainers. Prior to their incorporation as a group, the four had been making music together for three years. Before making their debut as a group, Swim had released a TJOnline-produced mixtape, Everyone's Got One. The group's debut release, "Yikes" by Koi featuring TJW (at the time of release, TJOnline and Swim were known as TJW and Koi, respectively), was released on October 22, 2019. This began a series of singles released by the group's individual members, culminating in the release of "Powerball" by TJW. These singles were compiled into an EP titled This Is Not The Album, released on April 1, 2020.

On July 10, the single "Raise It Up!", the first single from the group's debut mixtape, There Goes The Neighborhood, was released. Unlike previous releases, "Raise It Up!" was credited to the group as a whole, rather than to a specific member. Two more singles, "Watercolor" and "Blackout", were released before There Goes The Neighborhood came out on October 30, 2020. By the time There Goes The Neighborhood was released, Rhea had departed from the group. On November 19, a music video for "Wish U Were Here", was released.

On April 9, 2022, Grouptherapy's second EP, Truth Be Told, was released. The EP was preceded by the singles "Risky" and "Disco Pantz", a collaboration with Rejjie Snow and Tinashe.

=== 2023–2024: I Was Mature For My Age, But I Was Still A Child and TJOnline's departure ===
On April 25, 2023, the group released "Funkfest", the lead single from their debut studio album, I Was Mature For My Age, But I Was Still A Child. "Funkfest" was followed by "Nasty" and "Peak" on June 6 and June 15, respectively. I Was Mature For My Age, But I Was Still A Child was released on June 27th.

On March 8, 2024, the group released The Addendum - I Was Mature For My Age, But I Was Still A Child, a deluxe edition of their debut album. On March 20, TJOnline announced his departure from Grouptherapy, with Swim and Jadagrace to continue as a duo.

=== 2025–present ===
On January 16, 2025, the duo announced their new name, PartyOf2. Alongside the announcement, they released a song with a music video titled "we owe you an explanation".

On March 14, 2025, the duo released an EP titled we owe you an explanation, the first project under their new moniker and to be released by Def Jam Recordings.

On April 2, 2025, a music video for the single "poser" was released, becoming the duo's most popular single and first video in their history to reach over a million views on YouTube.

On September 5, 2025, the duo announced their debut album Amerika's Next Top Party!, which was released on October 17, 2025. The album was supported by the singles "JUST DANCE 2", "FRIENDLY FIRE", and "OUT OF BODY".

== Members ==
=== Current members ===
- Swim – vocals (2019–present, as Koi 2019–2020), production (2025–present)
- Jadagrace – vocals (2019–present)

=== Former members ===
- TJOnline – vocals, production (2019–2024, as TJW 2019–2020)
- Rhea – vocals (2019–2020)

== Discography ==
=== Studio albums ===
Title	Album details
Amerika's Next Top Party!	Released: October 17, 2025; Label: Def Jam; Format: LP, digital download, streaming

=== Mixtapes ===
- This Is Not The Album (2020)
- There Goes The Neighborhood (2020)
- Truth Be Told (2022)
- I Was Mature For My Age, But I Was Still A Child (2023)

=== Extended plays ===
Title	EP details
we owe you an explanation	Released: March 14, 2025; Label: Def Jam; Format: Digital download, streaming
