= Misguided Behavior =

- Directed by: Carl Payne, Avery O Williams
- Written by: Victor Cobb
- Produced by: Kim Flowers; Sharon Tomlinson
- Starring: Carl Payne; Khalil Kain; Clifton Powell; Malek Payne; Doris Morgado; Valencia Wilson; Elijah Johnson; Princetón Perez; Mike Martin; Towanda Braxton
- Cinematography: Freeman White III, Jerry Jackson
- Edited by: Tery Wilson
- Production company: Studio 11 Films
- Distributed by: Studio 11 Films
- Release dates: August 17, 2017 (United States); November 7, 2018 on digital platforms & November 27, 2018 on DVD
- Running time: 90 minutes
- Country: United States
- Language: English

Misguided Behavior is an American drama film written by Victor Cobb and directed by Carl Payne and Avery O Williams. The film stars Carl Payne, Khalil Kain, Towanda Braxton, Elijah Johnson, Princeton Perez and Malek Payne. It was released in 2017, by Studio 11 Films and November 7, 2018, on digital platforms.

== Plot ==
Misguided Behavior is a horror story affecting kids every day in schools across the country. Through Kevin's eyes, we are taken on an emotional roller coaster ride as we discover what lies beneath his teenage fears as he and his peers cope with being teased, abused and dismissed daily by their classmates. The movie's shocking end leads to the paralyzing truth about his real family and leads to his ultimate decision.

== Cast ==
- Khalil Kain as Michael Miller
- Valencia Wilson as Jessica Miller
- Carl Payne as Benjamin Fields
- Doris Morgado as Molly Fields
- Clifton Powell as Captain Rogers
- Malek Payne as Lance Fields
- Elijah Johnson as Kevin Miller
- Mike Martin as Stanley
- Princetón Perez as Christopher Arnold
- Towanda Braxton as Officer Payne

== Production ==
Principal photography began on July 27, 2016, in Las Vegas and wrapped August 11, 2016.

== See also ==
- List of black films of the 2010s
