= Tisha Lewis =

American news anchor

- Born: August 28, 1982 (age 44); Brooklyn, New York, U.S.
- Occupations: Television Anchor, Reporter
- Years active: 2015–present
- Website: tishalewis.com

Tisha Lewis is an American news reporter and anchor at FOX 5 News in Washington, DC.

== Early life and education ==
Lewis graduated from Virginia Tech, earning a Bachelor of Arts degree in Journalism and Spanish.

== Career ==
At 14 years old, Lewis was selected to become a "Posse Member" and Co-Host on Black Entertainment Television's nationally televised talk show Teen Summit. From 2006 to 2009, she was an anchor and reporter at NBC in Miami, Florida.

In July 2009, Lewis joined the CW's The Morning Show where she anchored news headlines on the network's flagship morning show. In January 2010, she joined WXIN in Indianapolis, Indiana as an anchor and reporter.

Lewis is a founding member of Fox News Channel's flagship Apprentice Program. In 2014, she was an invited special guest at the Ailes Apprentice Program's 10th Anniversary.

On June 18, 2015, it was announced that Lewis would join the FOX 5 News team in Washington, DC as a reporter and anchor.
