= Mindless Behavior: All Around the World =

- Film poster
- Directed by: Steven Goldfried
- Produced by: Brian Robbins; Joe Davola; Walter W. Millsap II; Steven Goldfried
- Starring: Princeton; Prodigy; Ray Ray; Roc Royal
- Edited by: Jarod Shannon
- Music by: Ryan Shore
- Production companies: Atom Factory; Awesomeness TV; Conjunction Films; Interscope Records; Society Pictures; Streamline Records
- Distributed by: AMC Theatres
- Release date: March 15, 2013
- Running time: 86 minutes
- Country: United States
- Language: English
- Box office: $344,500

Mindless Behavior: All Around the World is a 2013 American documentary film directed and produced by Steven Goldfried, that is based on the making of American boy band Mindless Behavior. The film was released on March 15, 2013 through AMC Theatres while being distributed by Awesomeness TV Films. The film also shares the same name as the band's second studio album, All Around the World and was released in the same week of the album's release.

== Plot ==
The film opens with Mindless Behavior winning the BET Coca-Cola's Viewer's Choice Award and their very first award at the 2012 BET Awards, then talks about the making of the boy band Mindless Behavior from when they were young boys coming from humble roots to maturing teenagers with super stardom. The film tells the childhood of Princeton, Roc Royal, Ray Ray, and Prodigy and how they got into Mindless Behavior. And how they travel across the U.S. for their first headlining tour, also known as the biggest tour of their lives. The film also captures the movement that is "Mindless Behavior" which reminds us of the meaning and all the hard work with dedication, we all can be Mindless 24/7. The film also features glimpses of their #1 Girl Tour performance in Atlanta, GA, plus, backstage and rehearsals, and the guest appearances of their parents. The film features Mindless Behavior visiting the old Jackson 5 home in Indiana and performing for their fans in the neighborhood who didn't make it to the concert. The film ends with the band doing their last concert for the tour as they will return to their homes as the last song performed from the concert is "Mrs. Right".the end credits features the 2 songs "All Around the World" and "Keep Her on the Low".

== Cast ==
- Jacob Anthony Perez (Princeton)
- Chresanto Romelo Lorenzo August (Roc Royal)
- Rayan De'Quan Lopez (Ray Ray)
- Craig Thomas Crippen Jr. (Prodigy)
- Walter W. Millsap III
- Lakeisha R. Gamble
- Myles Brown (DJ Big Deal)

== Music ==
The film's original score was composed by Ryan Shore.

== Home media ==
Mindless Behavior: All Around the World was released on July 9, 2013 on DVD and Blu-ray.
