= Mindless Behavior =

American boy band

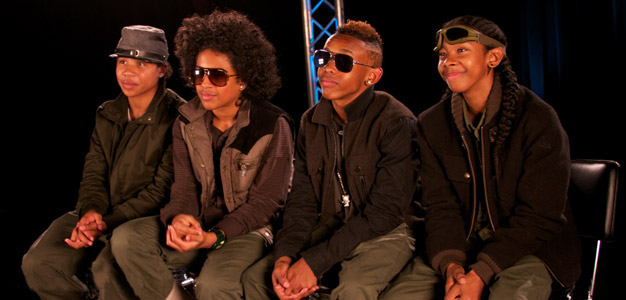
- Original Mindless Behavior members (left to right): Roc Royal, Princeton, Prodigy, and Ray Ray

Background information
- Also known as: The New MB; MB
- Origin: Los Angeles, California, United States
- Genres: R&B; pop; hip hop
- Years active: 2008–2017
- Labels: Interscope; Epic; Conjunction
- Past members: Craig "Prodigy" Crippen, Jr. Jacob "Princeton" Perez; Rayan "Ray Ray" Lopez; Chresanto "Roc Royal" August; Elijah Johnson; Michael "Mike River" Martin
- Website: officialmbmusic.com

Mindless Behavior was an American boy band who were best known for the singles "My Girl" and "Mrs. Right", produced by Walter Millsap. The band was put together in Los Angeles in 2008, by Keisha Gamble, Vincent Herbert and Walter Millsap. The band trained in dance and singing for two years before releasing a recording in Japan Music. The members were all in their early teens when the band was created.

Shortly after, lead singer Crippen separated himself from the group, leaving behind the original three members. The group would then introduce two other members, singer EJ and Mike.

== Career ==
They performed "My Girl" on The Today Show in November 2010. Their debut album, #1 Girl, was released on September 20, 2011. It debuted on the US Billboard 200 album chart at number seven.

Mindless Behavior toured with the Backstreet Boys, Justin Bieber, Jason Derülo, and was the opening act for Janet Jackson's 2011 tour. Mindless Behavior also headlined the first BET Closer to My Dreams Tour alongside Diggy Simmons, Lil Twist, Tyga, Trevante, and Jawan Harris. In 2011, Mindless Behavior headlined the SCREAM Tour with Diggy Simmons featuring OMG Girlz, Jacob Latimore, and Hamiliton Park. They have been predicted as Future Stars by This Must Be Pop.

In July 2012, they embarked their own 25-city tour, (#1 Girl Tour) with opening acts Jacob Latimore, Lil Twist, and rising star Kayla Brianna.

In March 2013, the band released their second studio album, All Around the World on March 12, 2013 and their feature film documentary, Mindless Behavior: All Around the World. Mindless Behavior announced the All Around The World Tour starting in July 2013.

On June 17, 2016, they released the music video for their third single, #OverNightBag. They announced that they were going on a tour their third album "No Parents Allowed Tour" but was cancelled soon after for unexplained reasons and are getting ready to release an independent movie titled "Misguided Behavior”. In February 2017, rumors started spreading around that the group had disbanded after Princeton announced it after answering a fan question as he claimed that the group wasn't getting the rights to their music and the members decided that they wanted to do solo careers.

In October 2025, original members Rayan "Ray Ray" Lopez and Craig "Prodigy" Crippen, Jr. reunited for the first time in six years, launching a series of dance classes and meet-and-greets with fans through Zap Xclusive, teaching the group's original choreography to songs such as "Mrs. Right" and "#1 Girl" in cities across the United States.

That same year, the pair marked the 15th anniversary of "My Girl" with a retrospective interview reflecting on the song's legacy and its impact on Black teen fandom. Ray Ray also appeared on Chicago television to promote a 15th-anniversary performance of the group.

In June 2026, Lopez and Crippen Jr. made a surprise appearance at the St. Louis event Second Sunday, performing for the crowd. When asked about the possibility of a full reunion tour, Lopez mentioned that offers had been made but did not commit to one.

== Band members ==
=== Past members ===
- Prodigy (Craig Crippen, Jr.) – lead singer (2008–2013; 2014–2015)
- Princeton (Jacob Perez) – backing vocalist, spokesperson (2008–2017)
- Ray Ray (Rayan Lopez) – backing vocalist, sub-rapper, main rapper (2008–2015)
- Roc Royal (Chresanto August) – backing vocalist, main rapper (2008–2014)

=== Member adjustments ===
The group experienced a lot of adjustments since their formation in 2008 that included original members Prodigy, Princeton, Ray Ray and Roc Royal.

In November 2013, it was announced that lead singer Prodigy left the group to pursue a solo career, which he proved to be untrue. He left the group because of bullying and mistreatment received from the camp. This left Princeton, Ray Ray and Roc Royal as a trio.

In April 2014, the group announced that EJ would replace Prodigy as the group's new lead singer.

In December 2014, Roc Royal was fired from the group due to his ill-mannered behavior. This included beating up a drug addict over money, having a baby at an early age and accusations of him stealing a producer's car. This in turn prompted Prodigy to return to the group to replace Roc Royal, who served a two-year sentence in prison for battery and robbery.

In June 2015, Prodigy left the group again, and it turned out that Prodigy was only a placeholder in the group to keep it a quartet. He left when Mike (who was the actual replacement of Roc Royal) joined the group.

In September 2015, Ray Ray decided to leave the group to pursue a solo career. This left EJ, Mike and Princeton (who was the only original member of the group left) as a trio until the disbandment of the group in February 2017.

== Discography ==
=== Studio albums ===
List of albums, with selected chart positions
| Title | Album details | Peak chart positions | | Sales |
| Title | Album details | US | US R&B | Sales |
|---|---|---|---|---|
| #1 Girl | Released: September 20, 2011; Label: Interscope, Streamline; Format: CD, digital download | 7 | 2 | US: 290,000 |
| All Around the World | Released: March 12, 2013; Label: Interscope, Streamline; Format: CD, digital download | 6 | 1 | US: 115,000 |
| #OfficialMBMusic | Released: June 24, 2016; Label: Conjunction, Alternative Distribution Alliance; Format: CD, digital download | 79 | 4 | |
"—" denotes items that did not chart or were not released.

=== Singles ===
List of singles, with selected chart positions, showing year released and album name
| Title | Year | Peak chart positions | | Album |
| Title | Year | US | US R&B | Album |
|---|---|---|---|---|
| "My Girl" | 2010 | — | 40 | #1 Girl |
| "Mrs. Right" (featuring Diggy Simmons) | 2011 | 72 | 8 | #1 Girl |
| "Girls Talkin' Bout" | 2011 | — | 50 | #1 Girl |
| "Hello" | 2011 | — | 124 | #1 Girl |
| "Christmas with My Girl" | 2011 | — | 96 | Non-album singles |
| "Valentine's Girl" | 2012 | — | — | Non-album singles |
| "Keep Her on the Low" | 2013 | — | 47 | All Around the World |
| "All Around the World" | 2013 | — | 105 | All Around the World |
| "Used to Be" | 2013 | — | — | All Around the World |
| "#IWantDat" (featuring Problem and Bad Lucc) | 2016 | — | — | #OfficialMBMusic |
| "#OvernightBag" | 2016 | — | — | #OfficialMBMusic |
"—" denotes a title that did not chart, or was not released in that territory.

== Awards and nominations ==
| Year | Awards | Category | Outcome | Ref. |
|---|---|---|---|---|
| 2011 | BET Awards | BET FANdemonium Award | Nominated | |
| 2012 | NAACP Awards | NAACP Image Award for Outstanding New Artist | Nominated | |
| 2012 | BET Awards | BET FANdemonium Award | Nominated | |
| 2012 | BET Awards | Best Group | Nominated | |
| 2012 | BET Awards | Coca-Cola Viewers Choice Award | Won | |
| 2013 | Radio Disney Music Awards | Best Music Group | Nominated | |
| 2013 | BET Awards | Best Group | Nominated | |
