= Diggy Simmons =

American rapper

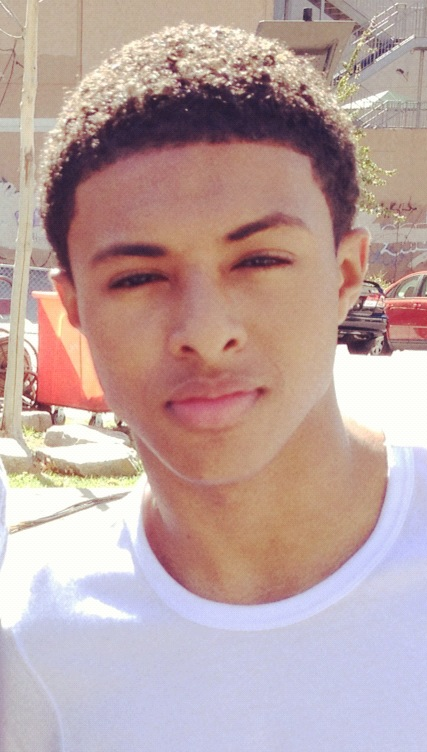
- Simmons on the set of his series The Start-Up in 2013

Background information
- Also known as: Diggy
- Born: Daniel Dwayne Simmons III; March 21, 1995 (age 31); Queens, New York, U.S.A
- Genres: Hip hop; R&B
- Occupations: Rapper; singer; songwriter; actor; Partner
- Years active: 2009–present
- Labels: Born Art; Atlantic; EMPIRE
- Formerly of: All City Chess Club

Daniel Dwayne "Diggy" Simmons III (born March 21, 1995) is an American rapper, singer and actor from Queens, New York City. The fourth child of Run-DMC's Joseph "Rev. Run" Simmons, he began his recording career in 2009 and signed with Atlantic Records the following year. In 2011, his single "Do It Like You" (featuring Jeremih) and guest appearance on Mindless Behavior's single "Mrs. Right" marked his first and only entries on the Billboard Hot 100.

His debut studio album, Unexpected Arrival (2012), peaked at number 11 on the Billboard 200 and was met with positive critical reception. He was chosen as part of XXL magazine's 2011 Annual Freshman List, and joined Lupe Fiasco's short-lived rap collective, All City Chess Club as its youngest member that same year.

In his acting career, Simmons has played Doug Edwards on the Freeform teen drama Grown-ish—a spin off of ABC's Black-ish—since 2018. Simmons, along with his parents and five siblings, were the primary subjects of the MTV reality television series Run's House (2005–2009).

== Music career ==
=== Music beginnings ===
Diggy Simmons released his debut mixtape, The First Flight, in 2009. More than 100,000 people downloaded the album from Simmons' blog. Following the mixtape release, according to Simmons, five record labels showed interest in signing him; he chose Atlantic Records.

Early in 2010, Simmons uploaded a video of himself freestyling over the Nas song, "Made You Look". The video became a viral hit and garnered praise from Kanye West, who responded on Twitter: "I knew this kid was [going] to be fresh. I knew it!"

It was preceded by the leak of the song "Oh Yeah!", which featured Pharrell Williams and Lupe Fiasco. Airborne, Simmons' second mixtape, was released in 2010. The mixtape track "Great Expectations" was featured that year in a national AT&T television commercial.

Simmons released his third mixtape, Past, Present(s), Future, in December. The mixtape, hosted by DJ Premier, features samples of songs from the 1980s and 1990s by such artists as Nas, A Tribe Called Quest and Rakim. A video was released for the track "Shook Ones", which samples the Mobb Deep song of the same name.

=== 2011–2012: MTV's Artist to Watch, XXL Freshmen and Unexpected Arrival ===
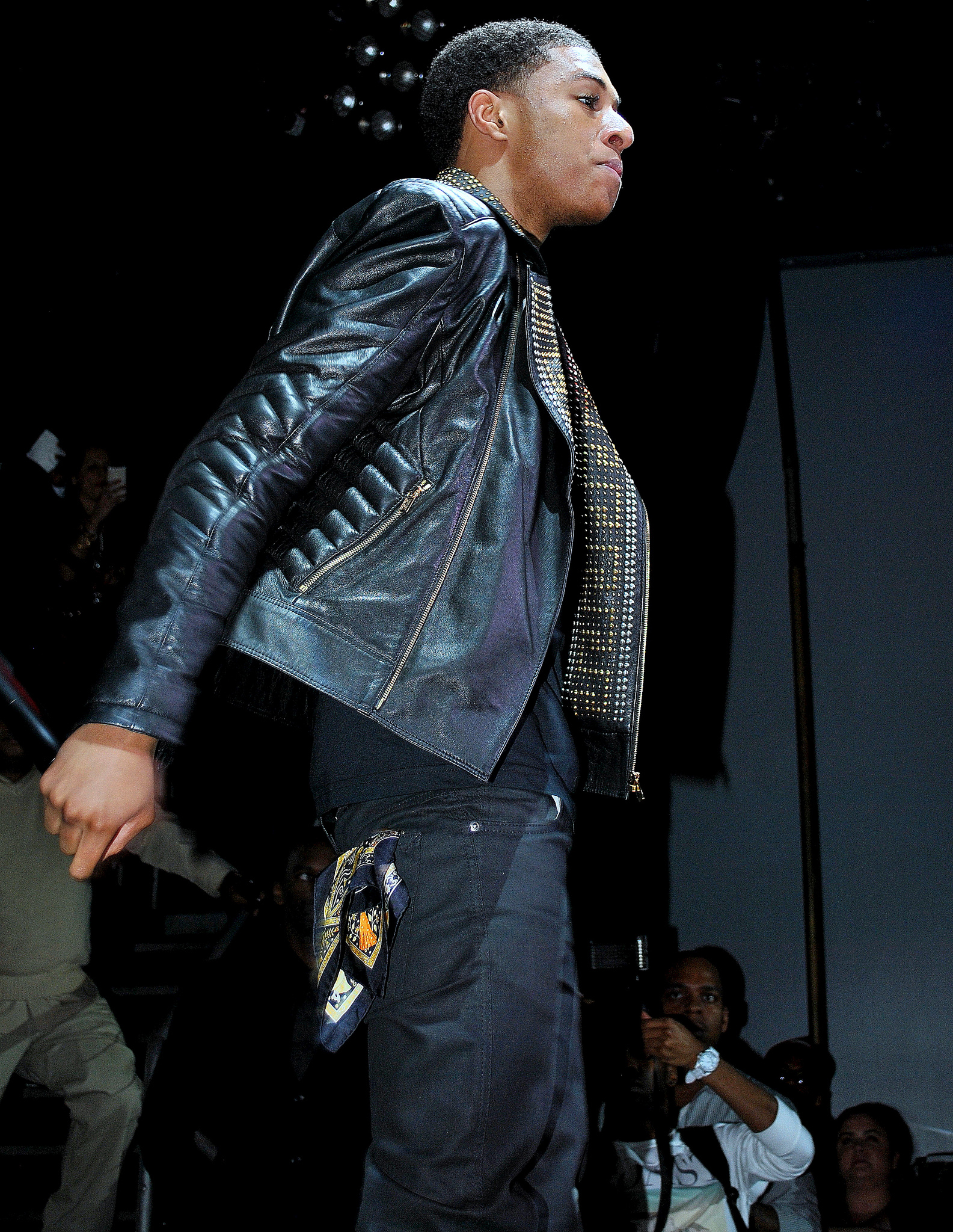
Diggy performing in May 2012

Early the next year, Simmons was named one of Billboard's "Artists to Watch 2011" and was selected to XXL's annual Freshmen list. In early 2011, Simmons joined a "behind the scene" group with several up and coming music artists at the time known as "B(before 20)12." Diggy went on his first tour for BET's 106 & Park Closer to My Dreams Tour in the summer of 2011 starring Tyga, Mac Miller, Mindless Behavior, Lil Twist, Jawan Harris, and Trevante. He released his first major-label single, "Copy, Paste", soon thereafter.

"Copy, Paste" peaked at number 24 on the US Hot R&B/Hip-Hop Songs chart in September. The song's video was directed by Phil the God, who previously directed Simmons' "Made You Look", "What They Been Waiting For" and "Shook Ones". Simmons performed the song during the pre-show for the 2011 BET Awards.

His second tour was Scream Tour's Next Generation Tour in the fall of 2011 with Mindless Behavior, Jacob Latimore, New Boyz, and OMG Girlz. Simmons is featured on the singles "Like 'Em All" by Jacob Latimore, "Mrs. Right" by Mindless Behavior and "Yeah Right" by Dionne Bromfield. "Yeah Right" reached number 36 on the UK Singles Chart in April 2011.

"Click Clack Away", a song featuring Bruno Mars, leaked onto the internet in May. Simmons noted that the track would not be included on his debut studio album, set to be released by the end of the year. That month, Simmons released the song "Just Begun" however Simmons tweeted on Twitter it was not going to be on the album.

On October 24, 2011, Diggy released "Do It Like You" as the second official single from his debut album, Unexpected Arrival a music video has been released with the song's featured artist Jeremih appearing in the clip. Also on February 24 the song "88" was released as the third official single. The song features Jadakiss and a viral music video was released for the track. Diggy's debut album Unexpected Arrival was released on March 20, 2012, a day before Simmons' 17th birthday. Billboard said it was "easy to find yourself nodding along".

The third was his own Life of The Jetsetter Tour in late early 2012 with returning acts Jacob Latimore, OMG Girlz, and added were Jawan Harris & new hip-hop duo TK-N-Cash. In 2012, it was announced that Simmons would once again embark on a tour with Scream Star Entertainment, and got his own headlining spot. The Scream Tour: Next Generation (Part 2) began in late August 2012 with special guests Jawan Harris, OMG Girlz, TK-N-Cash, YMCMB's Torion, and more.

=== 2013–present: Out of This World ===
Simmons announced that he was releasing his fourth mixtape titled, Out of This World via Twitter. It was set for release in 2013, but has yet to be released. On December 22, 2013, Simmons released an unofficial single after a year-long hiatus entitled "Mama Said" featuring B.o.B & Key Wane. In May 2014, Simmons released the first single from his upcoming mixtape Out of This World entitled "My Girl" featuring Trevor Jackson. The "My Girl" official video was released on May 7, 2014.

On February 10, 2015, Simmons released his first single in three years, "Ain't Bout To Do" featuring French Montana. Following this, Diggy released a second single, "Can't Relate" ft Yo Gotti on April 9, 2015. Simmons appeared on Scream Nation's Back 2 School Fest that started September 11, 2015 in Florida.

== Other ventures ==
=== Acting career ===
Simmons had a small role in the 2012 comedy Parental Guidance starring Billy Crystal and Bette Midler, that opened across the United States December 25, 2012. His part in the movie was cut due to "creative changes". It is unclear if Simmons' part in the movie will appear in a possible extended DVD released version.

Simmons landed his own 2-hour TV film pilot on BET titled The Start Up, which also stars Teyana Taylor. Simmons plays Blake, a 19-year-old college student and blogger who tries to get his blog of 5+ years up and running with the help of his friends. The project premiered on September 19, 2015. Simmons stated that "love is an emotional roller coaster and I've fallen in love." in a TMZ interview regarding the film. Since 2018, Simmons starred in a recurring role on the TV series Grown-ish where he plays Doug, Jazlyn's (Chloe Bailey's) boyfriend.

=== Clothing line ===
In 2010, Simmons launched a line of urban sneakers called Chivalrous Culture. He says he gets inspiration from other artists such as Kanye and Jay Z The first shoe model is called the "Hamachi". In a 2011 interview with Loni Swain, he revealed "Chiv Culture" has been discontinued.

== Artistry ==
=== Influences ===
Simmons has cited many rappers as his influences including Jay Z, Nas, Kanye West, Lupe Fiasco, A Tribe Called Quest & Wu-Tang Clan. He has also expressed an interest in such bands as Maroon 5, Passion Pit and Arctic Monkeys. Simmons said, "It's a genre I would want to try in the future."

== Discography ==
=== Studio albums ===
List of albums, with selected details and selected chart positions
Title	Album details	Peak chart positions		
Title	Album details	US	US R&B/HH	US Rap
Unexpected Arrival	Released: March 20, 2012; Label: Atlantic; Formats: CD, digital download	13	3	2
Lighten Up	Released: November 9, 2018; Label: Diggy / Empire; Formats: Digital download	—	—	—
"—" denotes a title that did not chart.

=== Mixtapes ===
List of mixtapes, with selected details
Title	Mixtape details
The First Flight	Released: December 2, 2009; Hosted by DJ Spin King
Airborne	Released: September 10, 2010; Hosted by DJ Spin King
Past, Present(s), Future	Released: December 23, 2011; Hosted by DJ Premier & DJ Spin King

=== Singles ===
List of singles, with selected chart positions, showing year released and album name
Title	Year	Peak chart positions			Album
Title	Year	US	US R&B/HH	US Rap	Album
"Copy, Paste"	2011	—	24	21	Unexpected Arrival
"Do It Like You" (featuring Jeremih)	2011	80	11	11	Unexpected Arrival
"88" (featuring Jadakiss)	2012	—	—	—	Unexpected Arrival
"Two Up"	2012	—	—	—	Unexpected Arrival
"4 Letter Word"	2012	—	61	—	Unexpected Arrival
"My Girl" (featuring Trevor Jackson)	2014	—	—	—	Non-album singles
"Aint Bout to Do" (featuring French Montana)	2015	—	—	—	Non-album singles
"Fakin" (featuring Ty Dolla Sign and Omarion)	2015	—	—	—	Non-album singles
"It Is What It Is"	2018	—	—	—	Lighten Up
"Anchors"	2018	—	—	—	Lighten Up
"Text Me" (featuring Leven Kali)	2018	—	—	—	Lighten Up
"Goin"	2018	—	—	—	Lighten Up
"Re-Up"	2019	—	—	—	Non-album single
"—" denotes a recording that did not chart.

=== As featured artist ===
List of singles, with selected chart positions, showing year released and album name
Title	Year	Peak chart positions			Album
Title	Year	US	US R&B/HH	UK	Album
"Yeah Right" (Dionne Bromfield featuring Diggy Simmons)	2011	—	—	36	Good for the Soul
"Mrs. Right" (Mindless Behavior featuring Diggy Simmons)	2011	72	8	—	#1 Girl
"—" denotes a recording that did not chart or was not released in that territory.

== See also ==
- Run's House

== Awards and nominations ==
BET Awards

- 2011: YoungStars Award (Nominated)
- 2012: YoungStars Award (won)
- 2012: Best New Artist (Nominated)

BET Hip Hop Awards

- 2011: Rookie of the Year (Nominated)

NAACP Image Awards

- 2012: Outstanding New Artist (won)

Teen Choice Awards

- 2007:Choice TV:Male Reality/Variety Star (Nominated)
