= Piper Reese =

American actress and internet personality (born 2000)

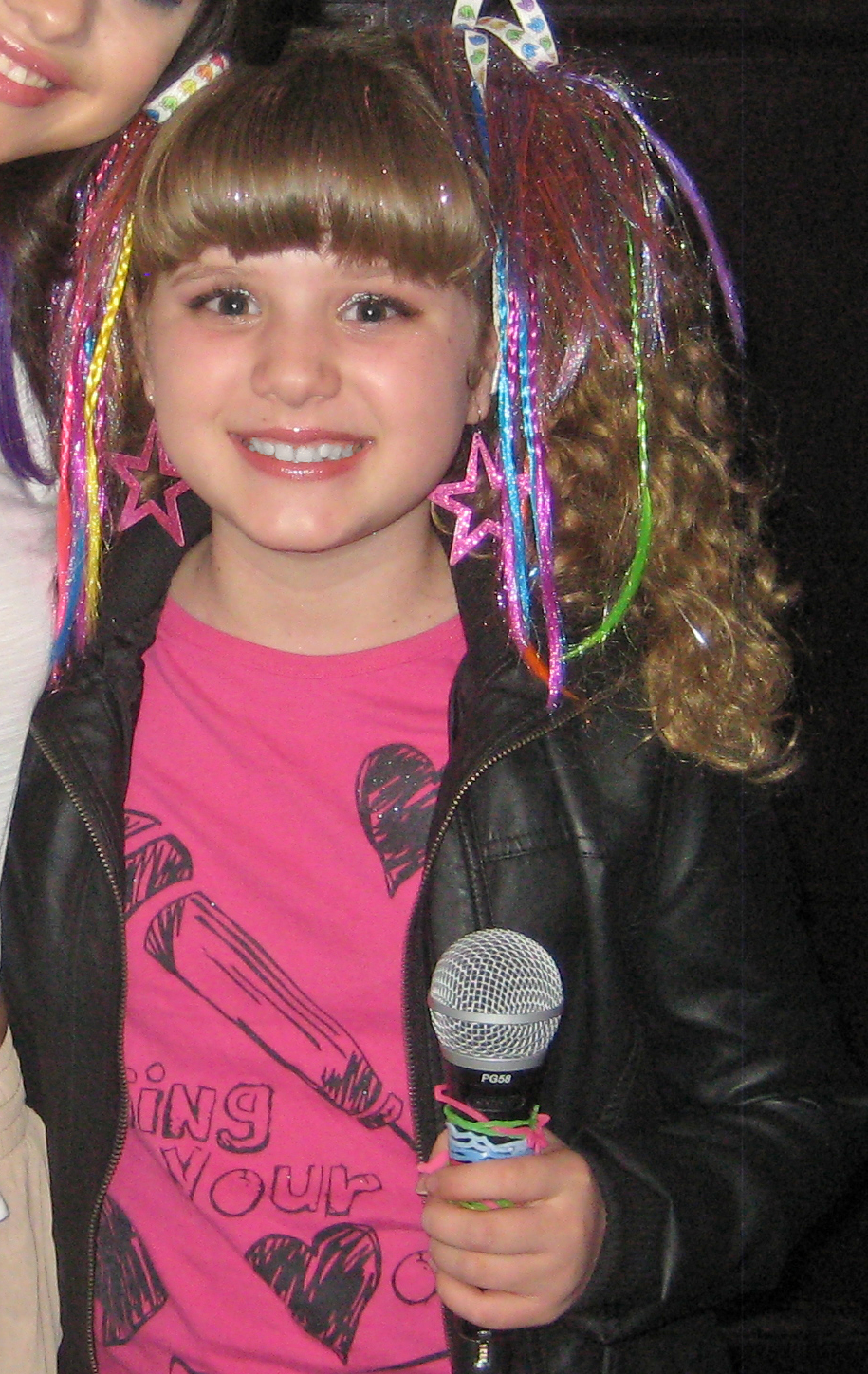
- Reese in January 2012 at the House of Blues in Hollywood, California.
- Born: August 13, 2000 (age 26); Coral Springs, Florida, U.S.
- Occupations: Actress, host, interviewer, internet personality
- Years active: 2007–present
- Known for: Celebrity interviews, comedy, pop culture
- Notable work: Piper's Picks TV
- Website: piperreese.com

Piper Reese (born August 13, 2000) is an American actress, television presenter, MPAA-accredited entertainment reporter, and Internet celebrity who hosts her own podcasts and YouTube series, Piper's Picks TV, Teen Tech Talk and InsPIPERation. Reese is the older of two children. As an actress, Piper is best known for playing Nancy Patanski on the Nickelodeon drama series Deadtime Stories. She launched an online scripted sketch comedy series entitled That's So Sketch in 2016. Reese has been working on her web shows since 2007. Piper Reese has been known by her fans as the "Piperazzi" since around 2012 and among both viewers and journalists as the "Princess of the Press."

== Career ==
=== Hosting & Piper's Picks TV ===
Reese in 2008

In 2007, at 7 years old, Reese began hosting Piper's Picks TV in Wellington, Florida and became the youngest video podcaster on the Internet. Each episode features Reese's take on a chosen topic, such as food, theme park rides, films, and television shows, or more recently, the episodes have featured interviews with celebrities. Reese's brother, Parker, appears with her in several of her show's episodes: #005, #008, #011, #017, #023, #025 and #037. In 2009, Reese's family relocated from Wellington, Florida to Los Angeles to support the growth and expansion of Piper's Picks TV and Piper's acting career.

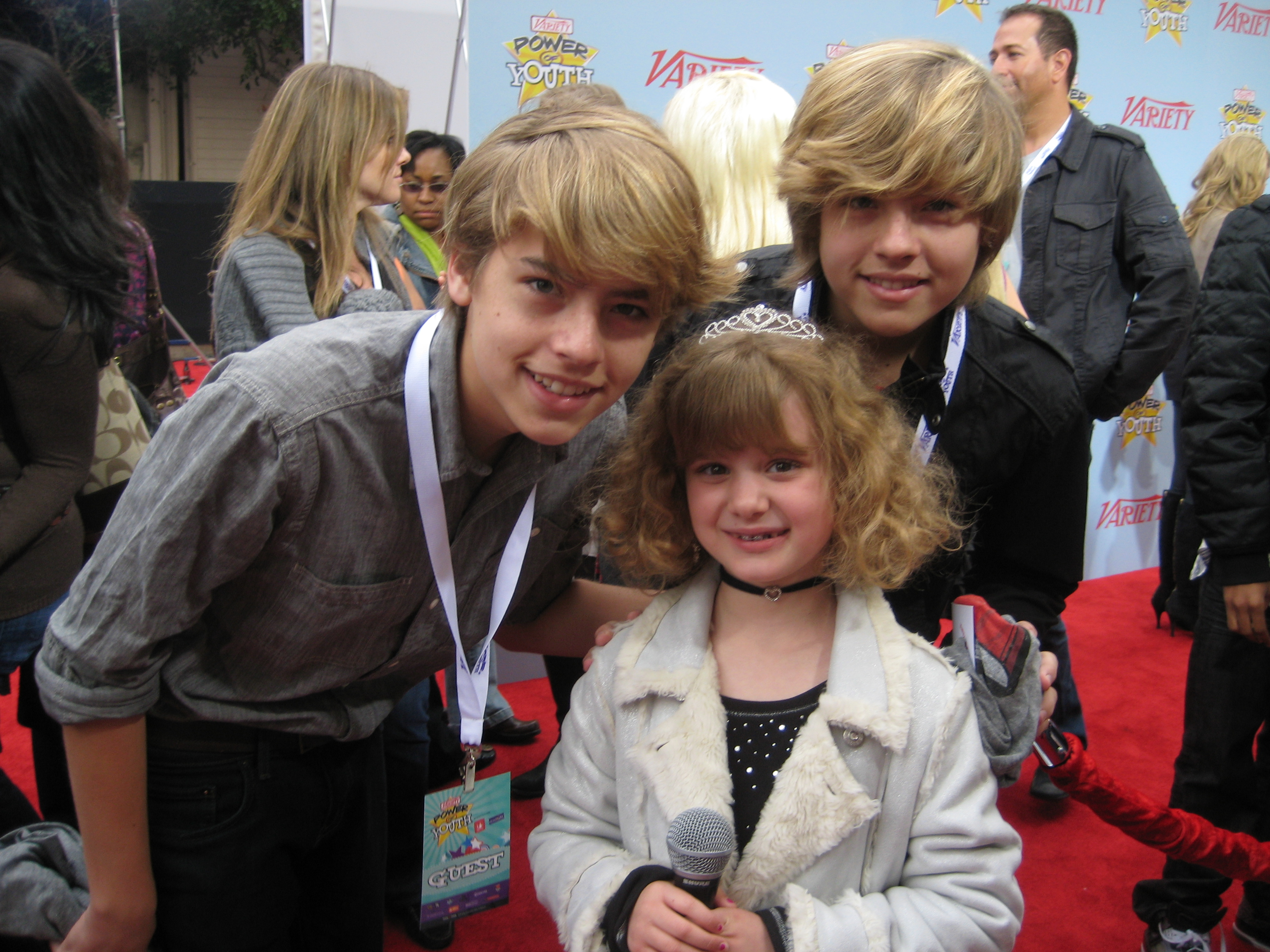
Reese with Dylan and Cole Sprouse at the 2009 Power of Youth event

In January 2010, Reese began hosting Piper's Quick Picks, a series of red carpet interviews with popular teen celebrities which run shorter than regular Piper's Picks episodes. The series has since been folded back in to Piper's Picks TV.

Along the way, Piper began hosting InsPIPERation, a blog-style series in which Reese answers questions and gives advice to viewers and provides behind the scenes information.

Piper co-hosted Funny or Die's Boy Search series in 2014.

In 2016, Piper started hosting Teen Tech Talk on the Piper's Picks TV YouTube Channel. the series covers techie subjects and gadgets in a similar style to the Piper's Picks TV series.

In 2017, Piper hosted a Delta Air Lines project aimed at introducing its Aircraft Maintenance Technician vocation to middle school students throughout the United States. Piper filmed on location at various Delta facilities including its headquarters at Atlanta's International Airport, a Florida aircraft repair facility, Miami International Airport and LAX.

Piper began hosting an education program aimed at high school students in 2019. The project went on hiatus in 2020 due to the coronavirus pandemic. In the same year, Piper's Picks TV tested a new series called The Bottom Line, a talk show-style series aimed at serious discussions on matters important to Gen Z and young Millennials.

=== Acting ===
Piper began acting as part of her early Piper's Picks TV episodes and later moved into stage and theater work. She made her first TV appearances on both ABC's The Neighbors and Modern Family.

Starting in 2013, Piper Reese played the recurring-turned-lead role of Nancy Patanski in the Nickelodeon and CITV series Deadtime Stories, based on the book series of the same name. Piper also made a guest star appearance in the Nickelodeon comedy series AwesomenessTV as hot dog cart operator Dot Hart.

That's So Sketch, the first scripted series from Piper's Picks TV, launched in 2016, and features Reese alongside other actors in short sketch comedy segments.

In March, 2018, Reese disclosed that a scripted comedy TV show she is helping develop along with her father, Piper's Picks TV creator/producer Adam Feinsilver, and Deadtime Stories co-creator Annette Cascone entitled Piperazzi was selected as the most promising TV concept at MIPTV as well as the only comedy concept.

In 2021, Piper made her film debut as lead Clare Taylor in the dark Dreamotion Studios' short film From Under the Bridge: When Bullies Become Trolls. The film is written by Paul James Houghton and inspired by real events about a lonely and insecure high school girl, trying to navigate her way through the dark shadows of her depression and anxiety brought on by severe bullying, cyberbullying and deception.

She lent her voice for the character Elena in the 2024 video game Final Fantasy VII Rebirth.

== Other appearances ==
- Host of Funny or Die's Boy Search.
- Guest co-host on TWIT's This Week In Tech with Leo Laporte on August 7, 2017.
- Kid Wonders, Microsoft/MSN video series.
- Peter and the Starcatchers drama stage production, playing Peter Pan. (May 20, 2013)
- Modern Family on ABC (October 24, 2012)
- The Neighbors on ABC (October 24, 2012)
- Nickelodeon Kids' Choice Awards (March 27, 2010)
- JennetteFan.com (August 29, 2008)
- In addition to hosting and writing for Piper's Picks TV, in 2008, Piper has performed "On the Good Ship Lollipop", "I'm a Nut", and, in 2013, "When Will My Life Begin" from Disney's Tangled in her schools' talent shows.
- Piper has been featured in parenting and news publications including the Baltimore Sun, South Florida Parenting Magazine, the Wellington Town Crier, and the Hartford Courant, the Orlando Sentinel, and Popstar Magazine.
