= Elijah Johnson (singer) =

American singer (born 1998)

- Born: Elijah Rhea Johnson; June 24, 1998 (age 28); Detroit, Michigan, U.S.
- Other names: Elijah J, EJ, Rhea
- Occupations: Singer; actor
- Years active: 2009–present
- Musical career
- Genres: Pop; R&B
- Instrument: Vocals
- Labels: Interscope; Epic; Warner Records

Elijah Rhea Johnson (born June 24, 1998) is an American singer and actor, best known as a former member of the boy band Mindless Behavior. He began his career as a child actor, portraying Young Simba in the Las Vegas and touring productions of The Lion King, until 2011.. Later in his career, EJ became the lead singer of the Kidz Bop crew until 2013. EJ is also known for performance on stage many times as a child and for his singles "Meet Me on the Dance Floor".

From 2019 to 2020, Johnson was a member of hip-hop collective Grouptherapy, performing mononymously as Rhea.

== Life and career ==
In April 2014, Elijah was announced to be a new member of Mindless Behavior. He remained a member of the group, among Princeton and Mike River, until its disbandment in 2017.

In June 2016, Mindless Behavior released their first album as the new "MB" titled #OfficialMBMusic. The album made number 100 in the Billboard Year End Chart. It was released instead of their recorded album "Recharge" due to member Ray Ray leaving the group and having Mike River as a replacement. This left the group as a trio with members Princeton, EJ, and Mike River. Later that summer, the group was part of a film called Misguided Behavior, which was released later in the summer of 2017. Elijah J's anticipated solo EP was due to be released at the end of 2017. EJ also starred in the 2022 BET movie, The Millennial.

Johnson stars as Michael Jackson/MJ in the Broadway production of MJ the Musical on April 4, 2023, replacing Myles Frost.

== Filmography ==
Film
Year	Title	Role	Notes
2013	Cass	Dwayne	PRIME
2017	Misguided Behavior	Kevin Miller	BET+
2022	The Millennial	Jacob	PRIME

== Stage ==
Year	Title	Role	Notes
2009	The Lion King	Young Simba	Disney production at, Mandalay Bay, Las Vegas, National Tour
2023	MJ the Musical	MJ/Michael Jackson	Lead Star, Broadway
