= Da Internz =

American hip hop group

- Origin: Chicago, Illinois, U.S.
- Genres: Hip hop; R&B; pop
- Years active: 2004–present
- Members: Marcos "Kosine" Palacios; Ernest Tuo Clark

Da Internz are an American music production team originating from Chicago and currently based in Los Angeles. The duo is composed of Marcos "Kosine" Palacios and Ernest Tuo Clark. Da Internz describe their sound as "gourmet ratchet", meaning imperfect but excellent.

== Background ==
Both men state that they were born to make music. Marcos’ mother started him in piano tuition at six years old. He picked up the saxophone in 5th grade and the drums in 8th grade.

The team came together in 2004 when Palacios was a student at Columbia College Chicago and Clark was working for Conquer Records in management and A&R. Upon graduation in 2006, Palacios was hired at Columbia as a professor of hip-hop beat making. He held this position for two and a half years.

The team has worked in several genres including hip-hop, pop and neo soul. They had their first major break in 2009 with Mims’ sophomore album, Guilt. The two served as co-executive producers for the project, where they had seven songs. The album’s first single, "Move (If You Wanna)", was released in 2008. Da Internz received ASCAP awards in 2013 for producing "Dance (Ass)" by Big Sean and "Birthday Cake" by Rihanna, two of their biggest songs. In addition to the ASCAP awards, Da Internz has had several Grammy nominations. My World 2.0 received a Grammy nomination for best pop vocal album in 2011. Life Is Good, by Nas, received a Grammy nomination for best rap album. Tamar Braxton's Love And War earned a Grammy nomination for best urban contemporary album. Love in the Future by John Legend was also Grammy nominated for best R&B album. Lastly, "Anaconda" by Nicki Minaj was nominated for best rap song for the 2015 Grammy awards.

== Influences ==
They cite Prince, Stevie Wonder, Quincy Jones, Gerald Albright, Donny Hathaway, Ella Fitzgerald, Charlie Parker, Cannonball Adderley, Charles Mingus and Michael Jackson as musical influences. They are also avid readers, citing Myles Munroe and Malcolm Gladwell as among their favorite authors.

== Production discography ==
=== Singles ===
- 2009: "Move (If You Wanna)" (MIMS)
- 2010: "Waiting Outside the Lines" (Greyson Chance)
- 2011: "Benefit of a Fool" (Boyz II Men)
- 2011: "Birthday Cake" (Rihanna)
- 2011: "Dance (A$$)" (Big Sean)
- 2012: "The Don" (Nas)
- 2012: "Marry Go Round" (Nelly featuring Chris Brown)
- 2012: "Mona Lisa" (Big Sean)
- 2012: "88" (Diggy Simmons)
- 2013: "I Would" (Justin Bieber)
- 2013: "Paradise" (Cassie featuring Wiz Khalifa)
- 2014: "Anaconda" (Nicki Minaj)
- 2014: "Good Lovin" (Ludacris)
- 2015: "If I Don't Have You" (Tamar Braxton)

=== 2009 ===
==== Mims - Guilt ====
- 02. "The Skit"
- 03. "On & On"
- 04. "Love Rollercoaster" (feat. LeToya Luckett)
- 10. "Makin' Money"
- 11. "In My Life (Why Oh Why)"
- 14. "I Do" (feat. Nice & Smooth)

=== 2010 ===
==== Jesse McCartney - Have It All ====
- 11. "Seasons (My Love Will Never Change)"

==== Justin Bieber - My World 2.0 ====
- 8. "Eenie Meenie" (Writing Credit)

=== 2011 ===
==== Greyson Chance - Hold On 'til the Night ====
- 09. "Stranded"

==== Boyz II Men - Twenty ====
- 07. (Disc One) "Benefit of a Fool"

=== 2012 ===
==== Big Sean - Detroit ====
- 10. "Sellin' Dreams" (feat. Chris Brown)

==== Nas - Life Is Good ====
- 11. "The Don" (produced with Heavy D & Salaam Remi)

=== 2013 ===
==== Cassie - RockaByeBaby ====
- 02. "Paradise" (feat. Wiz Khalifa)

==== Ludacris - #IDGAF ====
- 07. "Dancing Dirty" (feat. Chris Brown)

==== The-Dream - IV Play ====
- 06. "Where Have You Been" (feat. Kelly Rowland) (produced with The-Dream and Miykal Snoddy)

==== Mayer Hawthorne - Where Does This Door Go ====
- 02. "Back Seat Lover" (Produced with Mayer Hawthorne)

==== Big Sean - Hall Of Fame ====
- 08. "Mona Lisa"
- 10. "MILF" (feat. Juicy J and Nicki Minaj)

==== John Legend - Love in the Future ====
- 04. "Made To Love" (feat. Kimbra) (produced with Dave Tozer, Nana Kwabena, and Kanye West)

==== Tamar Braxton - Love and War ====
- 02. "Tip Toe"
- 07. "She Did That"

==== James Arthur - James Arthur ====
- 09. "Suicide"

==== Sevyn Streeter - Call Me Crazy, But... ====
- 03. "Sex on the Ceilling"
- 05. "B.A.N.S."

=== 2014 ===
==== JoJo - #LoveJo ====
- 01. "Intro"
- 02. "Caught Up in the Rapture"
- 03. "Take Me Home"

==== G Herbo - Welcome To Fazoland ====
- 08. "On My Soul" (feat. Lil Reese)

==== Candice Glover - Music Speaks ====
- 09. "Coulda Been Me" (produced with Darkchild and Hot Sauce)

==== Jennifer Lopez - A.K.A. ====
Leftover

- 00. "Love Line" (feat. Robin Thicke & Wiz Khalifa)

==== Trey Songz - Trigga ====
- 13. "Change Your Mind"
- 15. "Love Around The World"
- 19. "Serial"

==== Marsha Ambrosius - Friends & Lovers ====
- 02. "So Good"
- 04. "69"
- 06. "How Much More (Interlude)"
- 11. "Kiss & Fuck (Interlude)"
- 15. "OMG I Miss You"

==== Tank - Stronger ====
- 10. "If That's What It Takes"

==== Big Sean ====
- 00. "Jit/Juke" (produced with Nate Fox and L&F)

==== Nicki Minaj - The Pinkprint ====
- 12. "Anaconda"

=== 2015 ===
==== Big Sean - Dark Sky Paradise ====
- 08. "Stay Down" (produced with L&F)

==== Trey Songz - Intermission ====
- 02. "Don't Play"

==== Ludacris - Ludaversal ====
- 02. "Grass Is Always Greener"
- 07. "Get Lit" (produced with Lil Ronnie)

==== Sevyn Streeter - Shoulda Been There, Pt. 1 ====
- 06. "Love in Competition"

==== Tamar Braxton - Calling All Lovers ====
- 07. "If I Don't Have You"
- 17. "A.S.A.P." (produced with Snoddy)

=== 2016 ===
==== BJ the Chicago Kid - In My Mind ====
- 14. "Falling on My Face" (produced with Aaron Michael Cox)

==== Big Sean & Jhene Aiko - TWENTY88 ====
- 02. "Selfish" (produced with Flippa)
- 04. "Push It" (produced with Flippa)
- 06. "Talk Show" (produced with Flippa)

==== Trap Beckham - Now That's What I Call Music! 59 ====
- 22. "Birthday Chick"

==== Ro James - Eldorado ====
- 03. "Burn Slow"
- 13. "Eldorado"

==== Grace - FMA ====
- 01. Church On Sunday

==== T-Pain ====
- 00. Officially Yours

=== 2017 ===
==== Ludacris ====
- 00. "Vitamin D" (feat. Ty Dolla Sign)

==== DaniLeigh - Summer with Friends ====
- 07. "Lurkin"

==== Vic Mensa - The Manuscript ====
- 03. "Rollin' Like a Stoner" (produced with Rance of 1500 or Nothin')

==== Sevyn Streeter - Girl Disrupted ====
- 06. "Soon As I Get Home"

==== Trap Beckham ====
- 00. "Lil Booties Matter"

==== G Herbo - Humble Beast ====
- 07. "Man Now"
- 14. "This n That" (feat. Jeremih & Lil Yachty)

==== Tank - Savage ====
- 07. "Stay Where You Are"
