= RuPaul Roast =

RuPaul Roast may refer to:

- "RuPaul Roast" (RuPaul's Drag Race season 5), American television episode
- "RuPaul Roast" (RuPaul's Drag Race season 9), American television episode
