= Tamar Braxton =

American singer (born 1977)

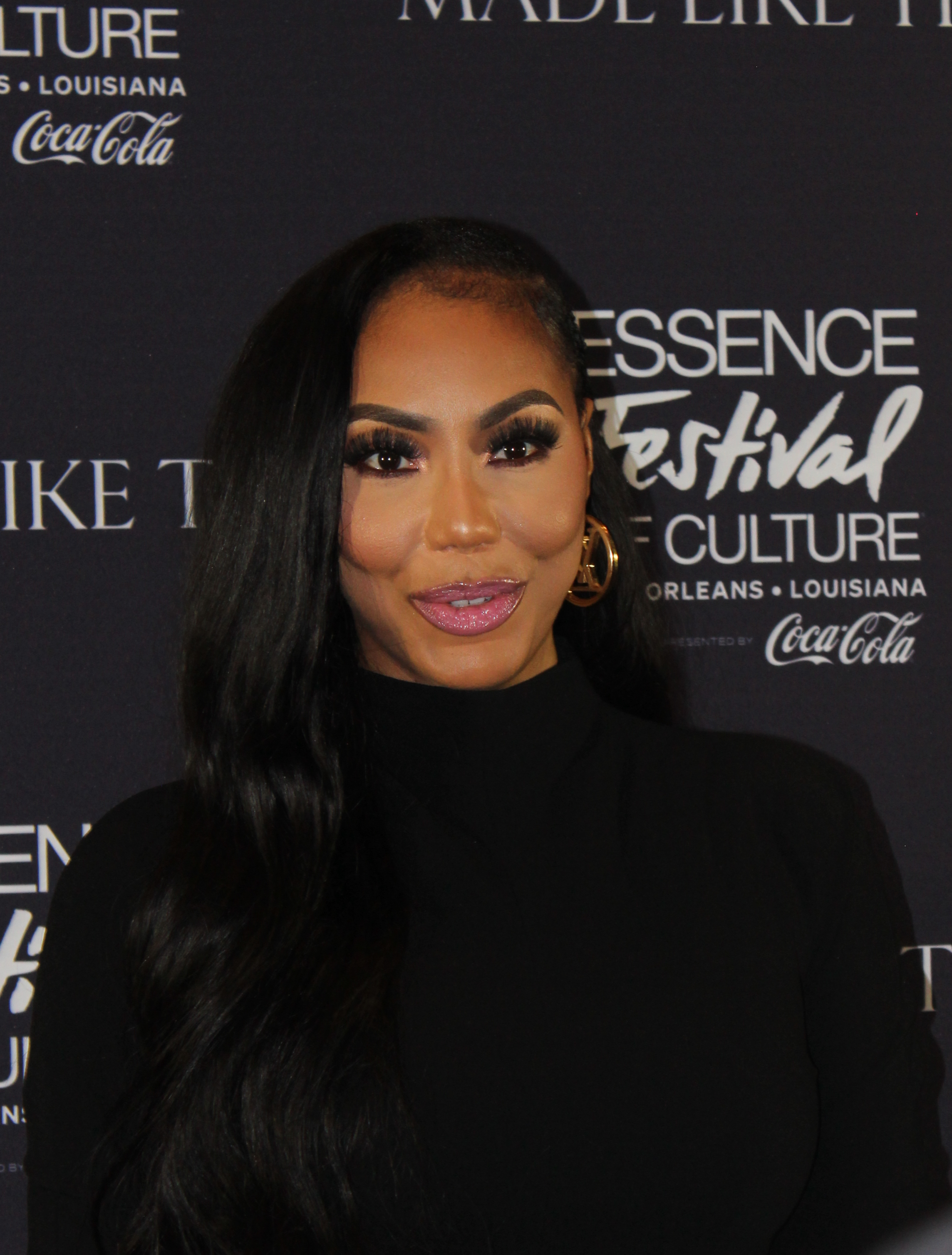
- Braxton in 2025
- Born: Tamar Estine Braxton; March 17, 1977 (age 49); Severn, Maryland, U.S.
- Other name: Tamar Braxton-Herbert
- Occupations: Singer; songwriter; actress; television personality
- Years active: 1989–present
- Spouses: Darrell Allamby (m. 2001; div. 2003) Vincent Herbert (m. 2008; div. 2019) Jeremy "JR" Robinson (m. 2024; div. 2024)
- Children: 1
- Relatives: See Braxton family
- Musical career
- Genres: R&B; soul; gospel
- Instrument: Vocals
- Labels: DreamWorks; Casablanca; Universal; Epic; Streamline; eOne Music; RCA Inspiration
- Website: Official website

Tamar Estine Braxton (born March 17, 1977) is an American singer, songwriter, actress, and television personality. She began her music career as a founding member of the R&B group The Braxtons, formed with her four sisters. The group released its debut studio album, So Many Ways, in 1996. After pursuing a solo career, Braxton released her debut album, Tamar, through DreamWorks Records in 2000. Following a hiatus from solo recording, she returned with Love and War (2013), which reached number two on the Billboard 200 and topped the Billboard Top R&B/Hip-Hop Albums chart.

Braxton subsequently released the albums Calling All Lovers (2015) and Bluebird of Happiness (2017), as well as the Christmas album Winter Loversland (2013). In 2025, she released the extended play (EP) Heartbreak Retrograde and its accompanying film. Her music has earned her four Grammy Award nominations, a BET Award, and three Soul Train Music Awards.

As a television personality, Braxton starred alongside her mother and sisters in the We TV reality series Braxton Family Values (2011–2020) and appeared in the spin-off Tamar & Vince. She co-hosted the syndicated daytime talk show The Real from 2013 to 2016, receiving two Daytime Emmy Award nominations for her work on the program. In 2019, she won the second season of the American reality competition series Celebrity Big Brother, becoming the first Black winner of the US version of Big Brother. Her subsequent television work has included hosting To Catch a Beautician, competing on Queens Court in 2023, and co-starring in the reality series The Braxtons.

Braxton has also pursued acting in film, television, and theater. Her screen roles include the film True to the Game 2: Gena's Story (2020), the series Kingdom Business (2022) and the animated sitcom Young Love (2023).

== Early life ==
Tamar Estine Braxton was born on March 17, 1977, in Severn, Maryland, to Michael and Evelyn Braxton. She is the youngest of six children, which includes her sisters and her brother Michael Braxton Jr.. Her father, Michael Braxton Sr., was a pastor, and both of her parents served as pastors at different points in their lives. Braxton and her siblings grew up in a Christian household, where they learned to sing from their mother and regularly performed in church. Braxton recalled that she and her sisters frequently harmonized together at home, contributing to their early interest in music.

Braxton initially attended Old Mill High School before later attending and graduating from Archbishop Spalding High School.

== Career ==
=== 1989–1998: Career beginnings and The Braxtons ===
Tamar and her sisters Toni, Traci, Towanda, and Trina, signed their first record deal with Arista Records in 1989. In 1990, they released their first single, "Good Life" with little success. In 1991, during a showcase with L.A. Reid and Kenneth "Babyface" Edmonds, who were in the process of forming LaFace Records, Toni Braxton, minus her four sisters, was chosen and signed as the label's first female solo artist. At the time, the remaining members were told that LaFace was not looking for another girl group since it had just signed TLC. After Toni's departure from the group, the remaining Braxtons members became backup singers for Toni's first tour, and featured in her music videos including the single, "Seven Whole Days".

In 1993, LaFace Records A&R Vice President, Bryant Reid, signed The Braxtons to LaFace. However, the group never released an album or single for the label. When Reid moved on to work for Atlantic Records, he convinced executives at LaFace to allow him to take the group to Atlantic also. It was reported in Vibe magazine that in 1995, Traci Braxton had left the group to pursue a career as a youth counselor. However, it was not confirmed until a 2011 promotional appearance on The Mo'Nique Show, that Traci was not allowed to sign with Atlantic because of her pregnancy at the time.

In 1996, Tamar, Trina, and Towanda returned with a new album, So Many Ways, which peaked at No. 26 on the Billboard R&B/Hip-Hop Albums chart. At the time of its release, Reid told Billboard magazine, "I had a vision for them then that was about young sophistication with sex appeal." The trio also performed a remixed version of "So Many Ways" with rapper Jay-Z on September 9, 1996, at the Soul Train Lady of Soul Awards. "So Many Ways" peaked at No. 83 on the Billboard Hot 100 chart and number 32 on the UK Singles Chart. The group then served as the opening act for Toni Braxton on the European Leg of her Secrets Tour in 1997. The Braxtons decided to part ways as a group after Tamar left to pursue a solo career with DreamWorks Records in 1998.

=== 1999–2009: Tamar and label troubles ===
In 1999, Braxton met Christopher "Tricky" Stewart. She recorded her solo debut album, Ridiculous, so-named for the many different musical styles on the album. The album spawned two buzz singles ("Let Him Go" and "Just Cuz") in hopes of garnering attention from the public eye; however, when the songs failed to gain impact on urban radio outlets, the album was pushed back and canceled. That same year, Braxton was featured on Sole's, "4 The Love of You." Instead of shelving the album, DreamWorks Records abandoned 3 old tracks, added new ones, and renamed it Tamar. The lead single "Get None" was produced by Jermaine "J.D." Dupri and also featured rap verses from him as well as former Jay-Z protégée Amil. The song also included uncredited background vocals and songwriting by R&B singer Mýa. As soon as the song began to pick up airplay, Braxton announced the album would be released in early 2000, alongside a second single, "If You Don't Wanna Love Me". The album featured production from Missy Elliott, Tim & Bob, and Tricky Stewart, and peaked at number 127 on the Billboard 200. When the album's second single failed to gain significant radio airplay, her label dropped her from their roster.

In 2001, Braxton's previously unreleased song "Try Me" appeared on the soundtrack album for the film Kingdom Come. She also began to work alongside her sister Toni Braxton in a number of songs and music video cameos, including the video for "He Wasn't Man Enough". She performed, co-wrote and sang background vocals on songs for Toni's albums, The Heat (2000), Snowflakes (2001), More than a Woman (2002), Libra (2005) and Pulse (2010). When her sister launched her Las Vegas revue Toni Braxton: Revealed, Tamar again sang backup until she was replaced by singer Sparkle.

By 2004, Braxton was signed to Tommy Mottola's reactivated Casablanca Records and had begun work on her second album. A "Grindin'"-influenced single, "I'm Leaving", was released with a guest appearance from Bump J. alongside promotional remixes featuring Sheek Louch, Styles P. and Ali Vegas.

=== 2010–2013: Television debut and Love and War ===
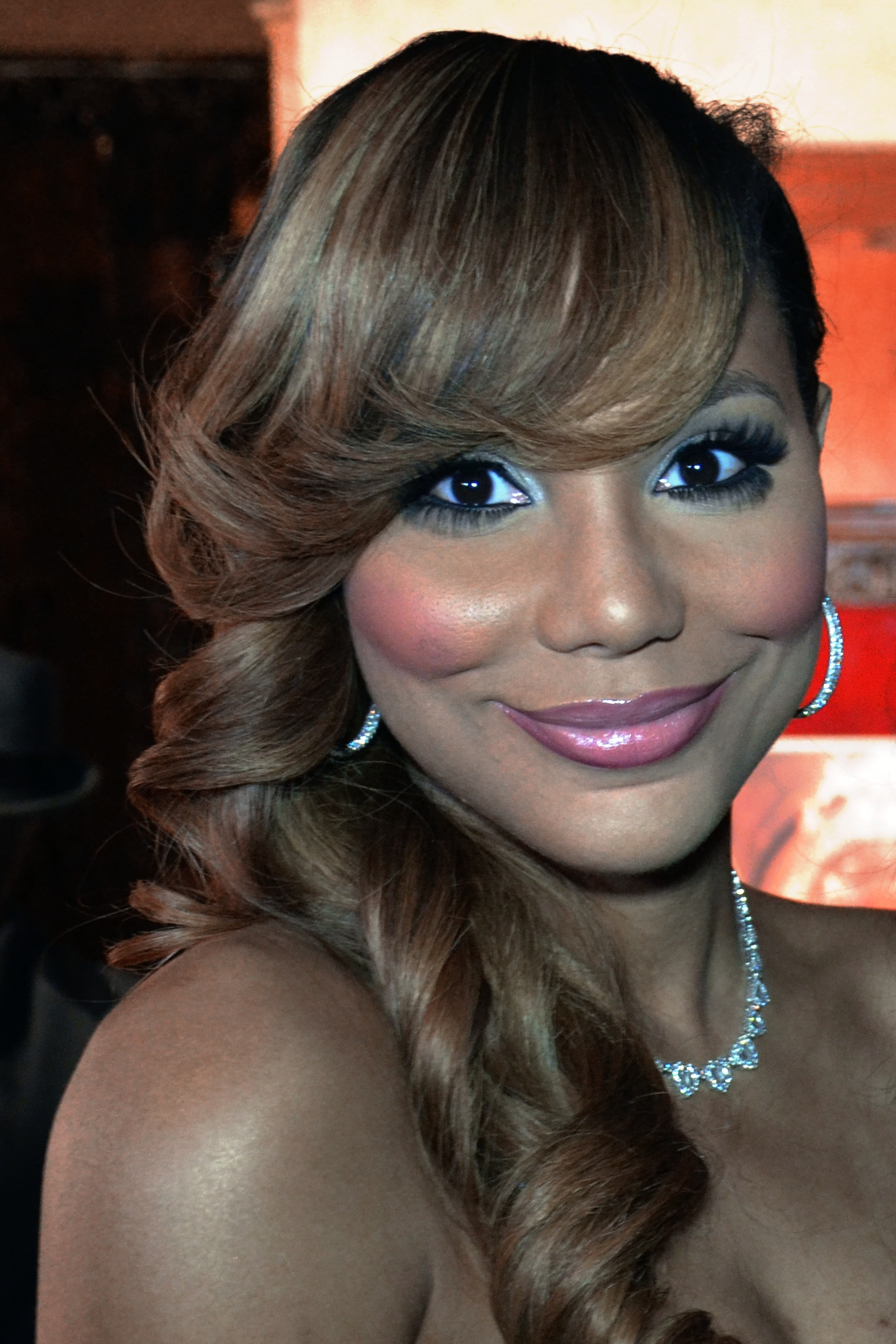
Braxton in 2012

In 2010, Braxton signed to Universal Records, where she recorded a song "The Heart In Me" that same year. The song was set to be included on the Adidas 2: The Music compilation. Her momentum with Universal would not rise to a satisfactory level to launch a second album. In January 2010, We TV confirmed that it had signed Braxton and her mother and sisters for a reality television series titled Braxton Family Values. The show premiered on April 12, 2011. On December 15, 2011, it was confirmed that Braxton and her husband Vincent would star in their own reality series centered on her solo career and their married life. In November 2011, Braxton performed "Love Overboard" at the 2011 Soul Train Awards for Lifetime Achievement recipient Gladys Knight. In September 2012, news broke that Braxton had inked a fresh recording contract with Streamline Records, an imprint of Interscope Records founded by Vincent. Later that month, her reality television show Tamar & Vince premiered on We TV.

Braxton was the featured model for the "Front Row Couture" collection during the "ELLE/Style360" NYC Fashion Week event. Braxton was a co-host of Tameka Cottle's late night talk show, Tiny Tonight, on VH1. Basketball Wives star Tami Roman became a co-host after Braxton. Later, she hosted The Culturelist, a show on BET's sister channel Centric. In March 2013, it was revealed that Braxton had signed to Epic Records ahead of the release of her second album, Love and War. The album's lead single, the title track, was released on December 6, 2012. The song was a commercial success, spending nine weeks at number one on the Adult R&B Songs chart. Although the single reached number one on the US iTunes chart, it peaked at number 57 on the Billboard Hot 100 and number 13 on the Hot R&B/Hip-Hop Songs chart. Braxton released "The One" as the second single from Love and War on May 7, 2013; it peaked at number 34 on the Hot R&B/Hip-Hop Songs chart. The third single, "All the Way Home", was released August 21, 2013; it peaked at number 96 on the Billboard Hot 100 and number 37 on the Hot R&B/Hip-Hop Songs chart. The song was followed by the release of Love and War on September 3, 2013. The album was a commercial success in the United States, selling 114,000 copies in its opening week; it debuted at number two on the Billboard 200, falling short of the top spot behind Ariana Grande's Yours Truly, and was number one on the Top R&B/Hip-Hop Albums chart. Outside the US, it debuted at number 34 on the UK R&B Albums Chart.

In 2013, Braxton began working alongside Adrienne Bailon, Loni Love, Jeannie Mai, and Tamera Mowry, when she became a co-host of the syndicated daytime talk show The Real, which premiered that year on July 15. Braxton's special Listen Up: Tamar Braxton premiered on Centric in September 2013. The second season of Tamar & Vince premiered on September 5, 2013, and is centered on the preparation and birth of the couple's baby, and her launch of Love and War. On November 11, 2013, Braxton's first Christmas album, Winter Loversland, was released and debuted at number 43 on the Billboard 200 with 8,000 copies sold in its first week. In December 2013, Braxton received three nominations for the 56th Annual Grammy Awards: Best Urban Contemporary Album for Love and War, and Best R&B Song and Best R&B Performance for its title track.

=== 2014–2019: Calling All Lovers, Dancing with the Stars and Bluebird of Happiness ===
On February 25, 2014, the remix of Robin Thicke's single "For the Rest of My Life" which features Braxton, was released as a digital single. Season 3 of Tamar & Vince premiered in October 2014, and it consisted of 10 episodes just like the previous seasons. On October 6, Braxton's new single "Let Me Know" featuring rapper Future peaked at number two on the Billboard Trending 140 chart, less than an hour after its premiere on Braxton's official SoundCloud account and eventually reached number one on October 7. Billboard.com gave the song 4 out of 5 stars in its review of "The Best and Worst Singles of the Week" for the second week of October.

On May 27, 2015, the single "If I Don't Have You" was released. The song peaked at number 6 on the US Adult R&B Songs chart. On October 2, 2015, Braxton's new album, Calling All Lovers, was released, peaking at number two on the US Top R&B/Hip-Hop Albums. On September 2, 2015, she was revealed as one of the celebrities who would be competing on the 21st season of Dancing with the Stars. She was paired with reigning champion, Valentin Chmerkovskiy. On November 11, Braxton revealed that she would have to withdraw from the competition due to health problems. Braxton and Chmerkovskiy finished in fifth place overall.

In October 2015, the group The Braxtons, including all five Braxton sisters, released a holiday album titled Braxton Family Christmas. On November 21, Braxton Family Christmas debuted at number 27 on the US Billboard R&B/Hip-Hop Albums, number 10 on the US R&B Chart and number 12 on US Top Holiday Albums on November 21, 2015. The album charted at number 4 on the US Heatseekers Albums on December 12. On December 7, 2015, Braxton received one Grammy nomination for "If I Don't Have You" at the 58th Annual Grammy Awards: Best R&B Performance from her latest album titled Calling All Lovers.

In May 2016, Braxton departed from The Real. The following month, it was announced on The Steve Harvey Morning Show that Steve Harvey had signed Braxton to produce her own talk show and television series with East 112th Street Productions. In April 2017, it was announced that Braxton left Epic Records to sign with Entertainment One for a $1 million deal with the label. On April 27, Braxton released "My Man" from her fifth album, Bluebird of Happiness. The song peaked at number three on the US Adult R&B Songs Billboard. Bluebird of Happiness was released on September 29, 2017, through Logan Land Records and Entertainment One, with "Blind" released as its second single. The album reached the top of the Billboard independent chart.

On March 23, 2018, Braxton and sister, Towanda, guest-starred in their sister Toni's music video "Long as I Live". In the same year, Braxton appeared on Hip Hop Squares. On March 28, 2018, Braxton was featured on Todrick Hall's song "National Anthem", from his album Forbidden. That same year, Braxton co-starred in the stage play Redemption of a Dogg opposite Snoop Dogg. In Parallel, she was featured on the song "Lions And Tigers And Bears", from the Todrick Hall musical Straight Outta Oz.

In 2019, Braxton appeared as a contestant in the second season of the American reality television series Celebrity Big Brother. The show premiered on CBS on January 21, 2019, and concluded on February 13, 2019. Braxton won the competition, becoming the first African-American person to win a season of Big Brother in the United States. In Big Brother tradition, she appeared on the American television soap opera The Bold and the Beautiful, portraying a character named Chef Chambre. Braxton taped her episode on February 20, 2019, and it aired on March 29, 2019.

=== 2020–2025: Television, film and musical comeback ===
In March 2020, Braxton released "Crazy Kind of Love", produced by Hitmaka, for the soundtrack to the crime drama film True to the Game 2, in which she starred alongside Vivica A. Fox and Darius McCrary. The film was released in November 2020. In May, she began hosting VH1's beauty makeover series To Catch a Beautician alongside hairstylist Johnny Wright. Later that year, she starred in the WE TV reality series Tamar Braxton: Get Ya Life!, which documented her personal life, relationships and efforts to relaunch her music career. In November 2020, Braxton launched her podcast Under Construction with Tamar Braxton, which featured discussions about relationships, motherhood, personal development and her career. The podcast ran for 37 episodes through 2021 and received a nomination for Outstanding Lifestyle/Self-Help Podcast at the 53rd NAACP Image Awards. After announcing her retirement from music in 2017, she resumed recording in 2021 and appeared on songs by Nigerian singer Mr P and R&B singer Elijah Blake. In 2022, Braxton joined the cast of the revived VH1 reality series The Surreal Life and appeared in the holiday television film Hip Hop Family Christmas Wedding. She also portrayed Sasha in the BET+ musical drama series Kingdom Business, a recurring role she reprised for its second season.

In March 2023, Braxton appeared alongside Nivea and Evelyn Lozada in the Peacock dating series Queens Court, in which she became engaged to contestant Jeremy Robinson during the finale. That month, she released "Changed", which interpolates SWV's "Rain" and reached the top ten of Billboard's R&B Digital Song Sales chart. She subsequently embarked on a tour celebrating the tenth anniversary of her second studio album, Love and War (2013). Her other acting credits that year included the TV One film A Mother's Intuition and the animated series Young Love, in which she voiced Star. In 2024, Braxton released "Notice Me", which reached number two on Billboard's R&B Digital Song Sales chart, and collaborated with Eric Benét on "Something We Can Make Love To", her second number-one entry on the Adult R&B Airplay chart. She also competed in the third season of College Hill: Celebrity Edition and reunited with her sisters and mother for the WE tv reality series The Braxtons, serving as an executive producer through Tamar Braxton Productions.

In 2025, Braxton became the host of the MTV reality series Caught in the Act: Double Life, which premiered on June 3. She also co-headlined The October Nights: Calling All Lovers tour with October London and released the single "You on You", which peaked at number three on Billboard's Adult R&B Airplay chart. On October 31, she released Heartbreak Retrograde: The Movie, a self-produced short film accompanying her six-track EP Heartbreak Retrograde, which was released independently on November 7. Produced by Tricky Stewart, the EP marked her return to releasing a full musical project since Bluebird of Happiness (2017).

=== 2026–present: Continued television and film work ===
On June 19, 2026, the thriller film Stepfather, directed by Chris Stokes, premiered on Tubi. Braxton starred as Asia, the wife of Taye Diggs's character, Darnell, whose pursuit of an ideal family leads him to kill families he considers imperfect.

== Artistry ==
Braxton is primarily a contemporary R&B singer whose music incorporates elements of soul, gospel and pop, with an emphasis on emotionally expressive ballads and contemporary production. She possesses a five-octave coloratura soprano vocal range and is capable of singing in the whistle register. She has cited Mariah Carey as her idol and named Whitney Houston, Diana Ross, Kim Burrell and her elder sister, Toni Braxton, among her musical influences. In a 2012 interview with Essence, Braxton explained that her self-titled debut album, Tamar (2000), did not reflect her musical identity, as her record label had sought to capitalize on Toni's success by having her perform similar material. She described the sound she subsequently pursued as a more personal expression of her personality, incorporating romantic and upbeat elements. Reviewing Tamar, Roxanne Blanford of AllMusic noted its combination of soulful ballads and upbeat rhythm tracks, describing its production as smooth and radio-friendly. Her subsequent album, Love and War (2013), combined traditional R&B balladry with contemporary, club-oriented material; Chris Kelly of The Washington Post observed that the album moved between sweeping classic R&B ballads and dance-oriented songs, while Andy Kellman of AllMusic considered its slower, atmospheric tracks the strongest showcase for her vocals and songwriting. On Calling All Lovers (2015), Kellman highlighted her stylistic versatility, describing its mixture of neo-reggae, retro-influenced rhythms, gospel-inflected ballads, contemporary slow jams and disco-funk. Her fifth studio album, Bluebird of Happiness (2017), continued her emphasis on mature contemporary R&B, combining polished production and emotionally driven ballads with prominent vocal performances.

== Personal life ==
In 2001, Braxton married songwriter and producer Darrell "Delite" Allamby, whom she met while working on her debut album. The couple divorced in 2003 after two years of marriage.

In 2003, Braxton began dating music executive Vincent Herbert, whom she met through her sister Toni. They married on November 27, 2008. On June 6, 2013, she gave birth to their son, Logan Vincent. In October 2017, Braxton filed for divorce from Herbert, citing irreconcilable differences and seeking joint custody of their son. Their divorce was finalized in July 2019.

Braxton dated financial adviser David Adefeso from 2018 to 2020. In September 2020, Adefeso filed for a domestic violence restraining order against Braxton, alleging that he had been subjected to domestic violence. Braxton denied that their relationship had been abusive. In March 2021, the case was dismissed and the restraining order dissolved after neither party appeared for a court hearing.

In 2012, Braxton revealed on an episode of The Real that she had vitiligo. In November 2015, she withdrew from Dancing with the Stars after being diagnosed with multiple pulmonary emboli in both lungs.

On July 16, 2020, Braxton was hospitalized following a suicide attempt. In an October 2020 interview, she said she had been diagnosed with anxiety and depression. She also discussed the role that her experiences in reality television had played in her mental health struggles. In a June 2021 interview with People, Braxton reflected on the period surrounding her suicide attempt and her recovery. She said that filming her reality series Tamar Braxton: Get Ya Life! had taken a toll on her mental health, explaining that she felt some scenes had been edited in ways that differed from how events had occurred. She also expressed dissatisfaction with what she perceived as an increasingly negative portrayal of her life on television and said she did not intend to film another docuseries centered on her personal life.

In August 2025, Braxton reported that she had suffered serious injuries in an incident over the preceding weekend. She said that a friend had found her with facial injuries and that she had fractured her nose, lost some teeth and experienced reduced mobility. Braxton stated that she did not remember what had happened and described her recovery as an ongoing physical and mental process.

== Discography ==
Studio albums

- Tamar (2000)
- Love and War (2013)
- Winter Loversland (2013)
- Calling All Lovers (2015)
- Bluebird of Happiness (2017)

== Filmography ==
=== Film ===
Year	Title	Role	Notes
2018	Gangland: The Musical	Celia	
2020	True To The Game 2	Ariana	
2022	Hip Hop Family Christmas Wedding	Alexis	VH1 TV movie
2023	A Mother's Intuition	Dr. Chandra	Lifetime TV film
2023	Christmas Angel	Tamar	BET+ film
2025	Heartbreak Retrograde	Tamar	Short Film; released to her YouTube channel to coincide with her EP of the same name
2026	Stepfather	Asia	Tubi film

=== Television ===
Year	Title	Role	Notes
2002	Intimate Portrait	Herself	Episode: "Toni Braxton"
2004	Starting Over	Herself	Episode: "Mission Accomplished"
2011–20	Braxton Family Values	Herself	Main Cast
2012	The Soul Man	Catherine	Episode: "The Ballentine Hands"
2012–17	Tamar & Vince	Herself	Main Cast
2013–16	The Real	Herself/Co-Host/Producer	Main Co-Host: (Seasons 1–2)
2013–17	RuPaul's Drag Race	Herself/Guest Judge	Recurring Guest Judge (including "Snatch Game" and "RuPaul Roast")
2015	Real Husbands of Hollywood	Herself	Episode: "The Fight for Duane"
2015	Celebrity Family Feud	Herself	Episode: "Anthony Anderson vs. Toni Braxton/Monica Potter vs. Curtis Stone"
2015	Dancing with the Stars	Herself/Contestant	Contestant: Season 21
2015	Being Mary Jane	Herself	Episode: "Some Things Are Black and White"
2016	Married to Medicine	Herself	Episode: "The Breast-est of Friends"
2017	In the Cut	Jackie	Episode: "Blast From The Past"
2018	The View	Herself/Guest Co-Host	Episode: "Guest Co-Hostess Tamar Braxton"
2018	Uncensored	Herself	Episode: "Tamar Braxton"
2018	Steve	Herself/Panelist	Recurring Panelist: Season 1
2018–19	Hip Hop Squares	Herself	Recurring Guest
2019	Celebrity Big Brother 2	Houseguest	Winner
2019	The Bold and the Beautiful	Chef Chambre	Episode: "Episode #1.8058"
2020	Legendary	Herself/Guest Judge	Episode: "Atlantis"
2020	To Catch A Beautician	Herself/Host	Main Host
2020	Tamar Braxton: Get Ya Life!	Herself	Main Cast
2020	Peace of Mind with Taraji	Herself	Episode: "Episode 2, Part 1: Surviving Mental Breakdowns with Tamar Braxton"
2021	Baddies ATL	Herself/Co-Host	Episode: "Baddies ATL The Reunion Part 1 & 2"
2021	Entertainment Tonight	Herself/Guest Co-Host	Episode: "Black History Month - Day 2"
2022	Urban Eats and Treats	Herself	Episode: "Tamar Braxton"
2022	The Surreal Life	Herself	Main Cast: Season 7
2022	Kingdom Business	Sasha	Recurring Cast
2022-	Dish Nation	Herself/Guest Co-Host	Main Guest Co-Host: Season 10-
2023	Queens Court	Herself	Main Cast
2023	Celebrity Game Face	Herself	Episode: "Queen's Court in Session"
2023	Basketball Wives	Herself/Host	Episode: "Reunion"
2023	Black Pop: Celebrating the Power of Black Culture	Herself	Episode: "Television"
2023	Young Love	Star (voice)	Recurring Cast
2024	College Hill: Celebrity Edition	Herself	Main Cast: Season 3
2024–present	The Braxtons	Herself	Main Cast
2025	Caught in the Act: Double Life	Herself; Host	MTV reality series

=== Stageplay ===
Year	Legacy	Role	Notes
2018	Redemption of a Dogg	Angel	

== Tours ==
As a headliner

- Love and War Tour (2014)
- Love and War 10th Anniversary Tour (2023–2024)

As a co-headliner

- The October Nights: Calling All Lovers Tour (2025) (with October London)

As a supporting act

- Made to Love Tour (2013) (for John Legend)
- Black Panties Tour (2014) (for R. Kelly)
- The London Sessions Tour (2015) (for Mary J. Blige, on selected dates)
- Promise to Love Tour (2015) (for Kem; withdrew due to health concerns)

As a special guest performer

- The Great Xscape Tour (2017–2018) (headlined by Xscape; with Monica)
- Welcome to the Dungeon Tour (2019) (headlined by Kandi Burruss)

As a featured performer

- R&B Music Experience Tour (2022) (with Monica, Tevin Campbell, Keith Sweat and other artists)

== Awards and nominations ==
Award	Year	Nominee/work	Category	Result	Ref.
BET Awards	2013	Herself	Best Female R&B/Pop Artist	Nominated	
BET Awards	2013	"Love and War"	Centric Award	Won	
BET Awards	2014	Herself	Best Female R&B/Pop Artist	Nominated	
Daytime Emmy Award	2016	The Real	Outstanding Entertainment Talk Show Host (shared with Adrienne Bailon, Loni Love, Jeannie Mai and Tamera Mowry)	Nominated	
Daytime Emmy Award	2016	The Real	Outstanding Talk Show/Entertainment	Nominated	
Daytime Emmy Award	2017	The Real	Outstanding Entertainment Talk Show Host (shared with Adrienne Bailon, Loni Love, Jeannie Mai and Tamera Mowry)	Nominated	
Grammy Award	2014	Love and War	Best Urban Contemporary Album	Nominated	
Grammy Award	2014	"Love and War"	Best R&B Song	Nominated	
Grammy Award	2014	"Love and War"	Best R&B Performance	Nominated	
Grammy Award	2016	"If I Don't Have You"	Best R&B Performance	Nominated	
Soul Train Music Awards	2013	Herself	Best New Artist	Nominated	
Soul Train Music Awards	2013	Herself	Best R&B/Soul Female Artist	Won	
Soul Train Music Awards	2013	"Love and War"	Song of the Year	Nominated	
Soul Train Music Awards	2013	"Love and War"	The Ashford & Simpson Songwriter's Award	Won	
Soul Train Music Awards	2013	"Love and War"	Video of the Year	Nominated	
Soul Train Music Awards	2015	Herself	Best R&B/Soul Female Artist	Nominated	
