= Twenty (Boyz II Men album) =

Studio album by Boyz II Men
- Released: October 12, 2011
- Length: 88:46
- Labels: MSM; Benchmark
- Producers: Babyface; Boyz II Men; Julian Bunetta; Antonio Dixon; Da Internz; Jimmy Jam and Terry Lewis; Khris & AL; Rex Rideout; Teddy Riley; Tim & Bob

Boyz II Men chronology
Covered: Winter (2010)	Twenty (2011)	Collide (2014)

Singles from Twenty
- 1. "More Than You'll Ever Know" Released: 30 August 2011; 2. "One up for Love" Released: 17 October 2011; 3. "Flow" Released: 17 October 2011

Twenty is the thirteenth studio album by American R&B group Boyz II Men. The album was released in the United States on October 25, 2011. The first single was "More Than You'll Ever Know" featuring Charlie Wilson. As of September 2011, the single was the most added song to radio sets on urban adult contemporary radio stations. The album featured 14 new material songs and 8 rerecorded Boyz II Men classics. The album's title, and its inclusion of older tracks remastered, is as a celebration of the groups' 20th anniversary since their debut in 1991 with Cooleyhighharmony. It was produced Tim & Bob, Babyface, Jimmy Jam and Terry Lewis, and Teddy Riley. The album debuted at number 20 on the Billboard 200, selling 18,400 copies in its first week.

== Critical reception ==
Professional ratings
Review scores
Source	Rating
About.com	3.5/5 stars
AllMusic	3.5/5 stars
Entertainment Weekly	B
The Guardian	4/5 stars

AllMusic editor Andy Kellman called the album Boyz II Men's "most enjoyable work since 2000's Nathan Michael Shawn Wanya." He found that "rather than attempt to compete with younger acts on the charts, they largely stick to their tried and true approach and appeal to their longtime listeners. Some of the slower songs get a little raunchy, but most of them switch between romantic pleading and uplifting/inspirational modes [...] That Boyz II Men still have it, both individually and collectively, is undeniable; their group harmonies sound as easy as ever. That’s what they had over most contemporary R&B acts in 1991, and that's what they have over all of them in 2011."

== Chart performance ==
Twenty debuted at number 20 on the US Billboard 200, selling 18,400 copies in its first week of release.

== Track listing ==
Disc 1
No.	Title	Writer(s)	Producer(s)	Length
1.	"Believe"	Nathan Morris; Wanya Morris; Shawn Stockman; Melodye Perry; Teddy Riley; Alex Teamer	Riley	3:30
2.	"So Amazing"	N. Morris; W. Morris; Stockman; Tim Kelley; Bob Robinson	Tim & Bob	4:37
3.	"Put Some Music On"	N. Morris; W. Morris; Stockman; Julian Bunetta	Bunetta	4:15
4.	"Slowly"	N. Morris; W. Morris; Stockman; Kelley; Robinson	Tim & Bob	4:21
5.	"More Than You'll Ever Know" (featuring Charlie Wilson)	Clarice Bell-Strayhorn; Dennis Bettis; Wirlie Morris; C. Wilson; Mahin Wilson	W. Morris; C. Wilson	4:09
6.	"I Shoulda Lied"	Eric Dawkins; Antonio Dixon; Kenneth Edmonds; W. Morris	Babyface; Dixon	4:06
7.	"Benefit of a Fool"	Eric Bellinger; Ernest Clark; Marcos Palacios; Aaron Michael Cox; W. Morris	Da Internz	3:52
8.	"Refuse to Be the Reason"	N. Morris; W. Morris; Stockman; Rex Rideout	Rideout	4:49
9.	"One More Dance"	Bryan-Michael Cox; Dixon; Edmonds; Patrick "J. Que" Smith	Babyface; Dixon	4:33
10.	"Will You Be There"	N. Morris; W. Morris; Stockman; Kelley; Robinson	Tim & Bob	4:15
11.	"Flow"	Donnell Shawn Butler; Riley; Matthew Washington	Riley	3:40
12.	"One Up for Love"	Harry Bonner; Dixon; Stacy Dulan; Edmonds; Marcie Evans; Erik Griggs; Alvin Isaacs; Khristopher Riddick-Tynes	Khris & AL; Babyface	3:28

Japan bonus track
No.	Title	Writer(s)	Producer(s)	Length
13.	"End of the Day" (featuring Exile Atsushi)	Riley; Atsushi; Jenson Vaughan	Riley	3:57

Disc 2
No.	Title	Writer(s)	Producer(s)	Length
1.	"Motownphilly"	Dallas Austin; Michael Bivins; N. Morris; Stockman	Tim & Bob	3:50
2.	"On Bended Knee"	James Harris III; Terry Lewis	Jimmy Jam & Terry Lewis	5:35
3.	"Four Seasons of Loneliness"	Harris; Lewis	Jimmy Jam & Terry Lewis	4:58
4.	"Water Runs Dry"	Edmonds	Babyface; Dixon	3:25
5.	"A Song for Mama"	Edmonds	Babyface; Dixon	5:10
6.	"It's So Hard to Say Goodbye to Yesterday"	Freddie Perren; Christine Yarian	Boyz II Men	3:01
7.	"I'll Make Love to You"	Edmonds	Babyface; Dixon	4:00
8.	"End of the Road"	Edmonds; Antonio "L.A." Reid; Daryl Simmons	Babyface; Dixon	5:33
9.	"Not Like You"	Harris; Lewis	Jimmy Jam & Terry Lewis	4:35

== Charts ==
=== Weekly charts ===
Chart (2011)	Peak position
Japanese Albums (Oricon)	52
UK Albums (Official Charts)	63
UK R&B Albums (Official Charts)	7
US Billboard 200	20
US Top R&B/Hip-Hop Albums (Billboard)	4

=== Year-end charts ===
Chart (2012)	Position
US Top R&B/Hip-Hop Albums (Billboard)	97

== Release history ==
Twenty release history
Region	Date	Format	Label	Ref(s)
Japan	October 12, 2011	CD; digital download	Rhythm Zone; Avex	
United Kingdom	October 17, 2011	CD; digital download	Universal Music TV	
United States	October 25, 2011	CD; digital download	MSM; Benchmark; Warner Bros.	
