= 9021-HO =

- RuPaul's Drag Race episode
- Episode no.: Season 9 Episode 7
- Presented by: RuPaul
- Original air date: May 5, 2017

Guest appearances
- Jennie Garth; Tori Spelling

Episode chronology
← Previous "Snatch Game"	Next → "RuPaul Roast"

"9021-HO" is the seventh episode of the ninth season of the American television series RuPaul's Drag Race. It originally aired on May 5, 2017. The episode's main challenge tasks the contestants with acting in a 90210 parody. Jennie Garth and Tori Spelling are guest judges. Trinity Taylor wins the main challenge. Aja is eliminated from the competition after placing in the bottom and losing a lip-sync contest against Nina Bo'nina Brown to "Finally" by Cece Peniston.

== Episode ==
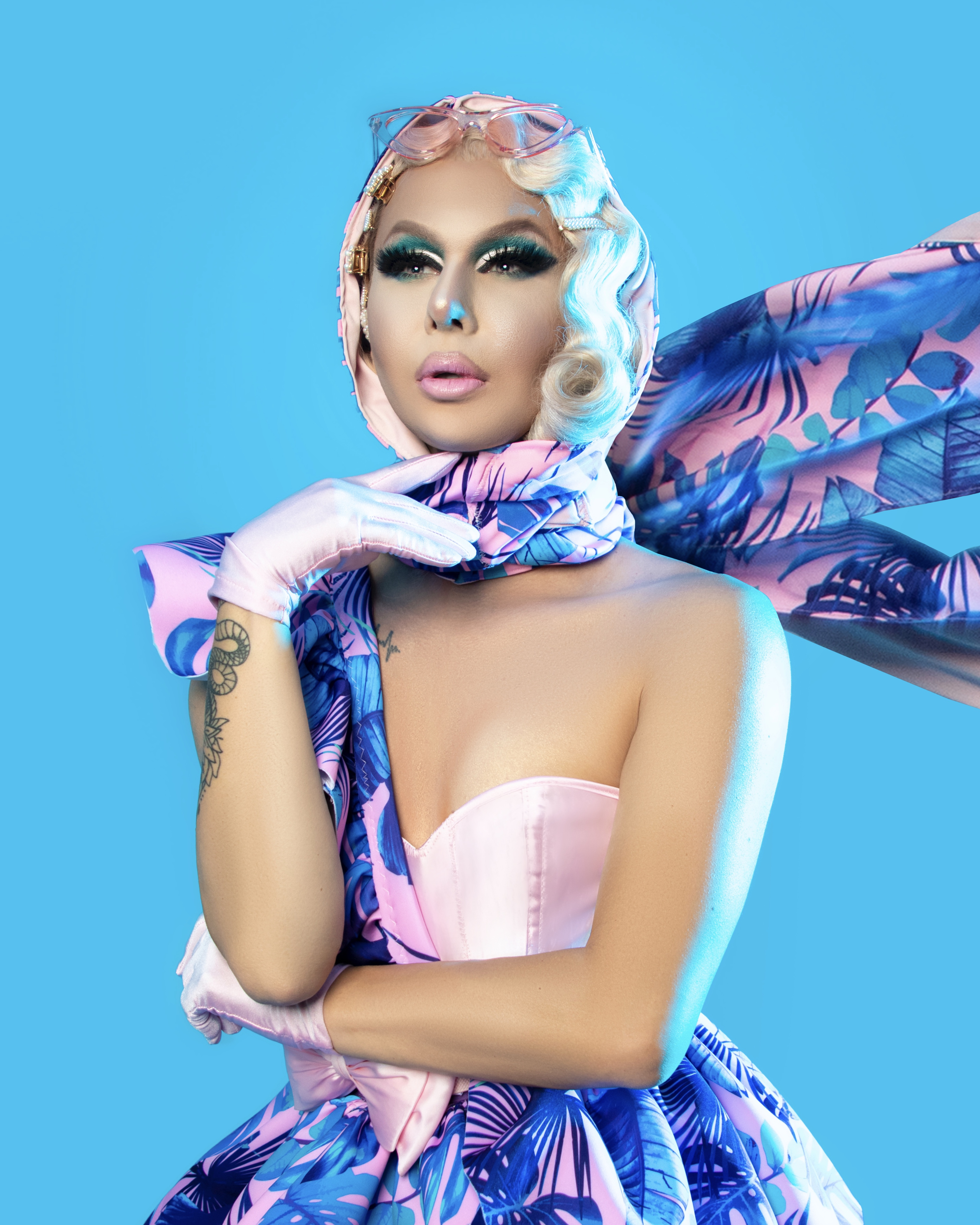
Trinity Taylor (pictured) wins the episode's main challenge.

The contestants return to the workroom after Cynthia Lee Fontaine's elimination on the previous episode. On a new day, RuPaul greets the group and reveals the main challenge, which tasks the contestants with acting in a 90210 parody spin-off, titled 9021-HO. RuPaul also reveals that Jennie Garth and Tori Spelling will assist with the challenge. Peppermint is tasked with assigning the roles. After the contestants share their character preferences, Peppermint announces the following cast:

- Aja plays Bethani Glamber Gliessen
- Alexis Michelle plays Mirror Monna Dartin
- Farrah Moan plays Nelly
- Nina Bo'nina Brown plays Blenda Shmaltz
- Peppermint plays Brandi Shmaltz
- Sasha Velour plays Lunch Lady Kat
- Shea Couleé plays Grandrea Zuckerwoman
- Trinity Taylor plays Nelly's Mom
- Valentina plays Monna Dartin

The contestants begin to rehearse in the workroom, then film with guest directors Garth and Spelling. Back in the workroom, Aja admits to feeling bad for throwing a tantrum, when she initially got a role she did not prefer. The contestants discuss their prom experiences. Trinity Taylor talks about quitting school to take care of a terminally ill family member and missing prom. Shea Couleé discusses her relationship with her father, then Sasha Velour talks about the death of her mother.

On the main stage, RuPaul welcomes fellow judges Michelle Visage and Carson Kressley, as well as guest judges Garth and Spelling. RuPaul shares the runway category ("Big Hair Everywhere"), then the fashion show commences. After the contestants present their looks, the judges and contestants watch 9021-HO. The judges deliver their critiques, deliberate, then share the results with the group. Shea Couleé, Trinity Taylor, and Valentina receive positive critiques, and Trinity Taylor wins the challenge. Aja, Nina Bo'nina Brown, and Sasha Velour receive negative critiques, and Sasha Velour is deemed safe. Aja and Nina Bo'nina Brown place in the bottom and face off in a lip-sync contest to "Finally" (1991) by Cece Peniston. Nina Bo'nina Brown wins the lip-sync and Aja is eliminated from the competition.

== Production and broadcast ==
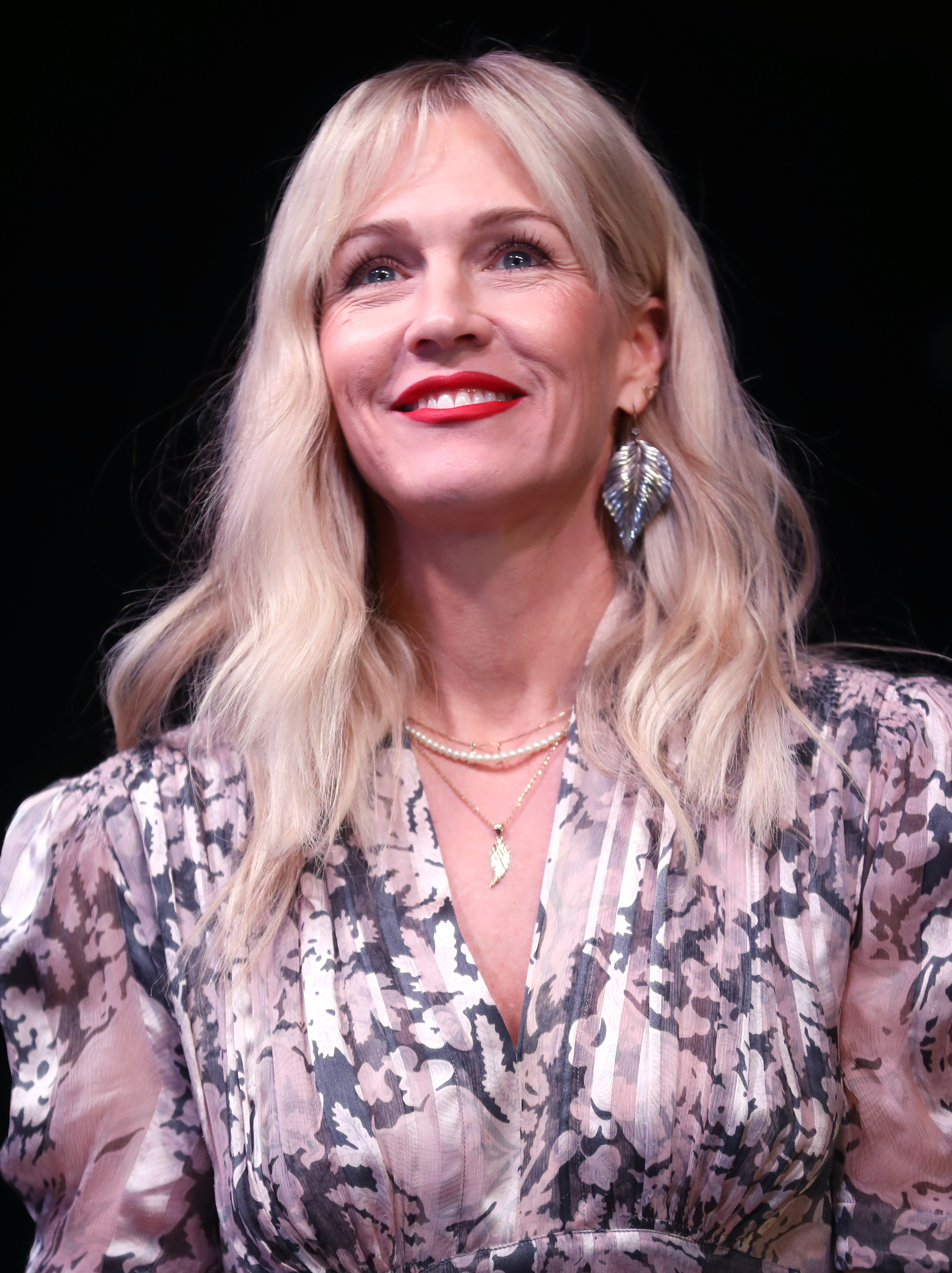
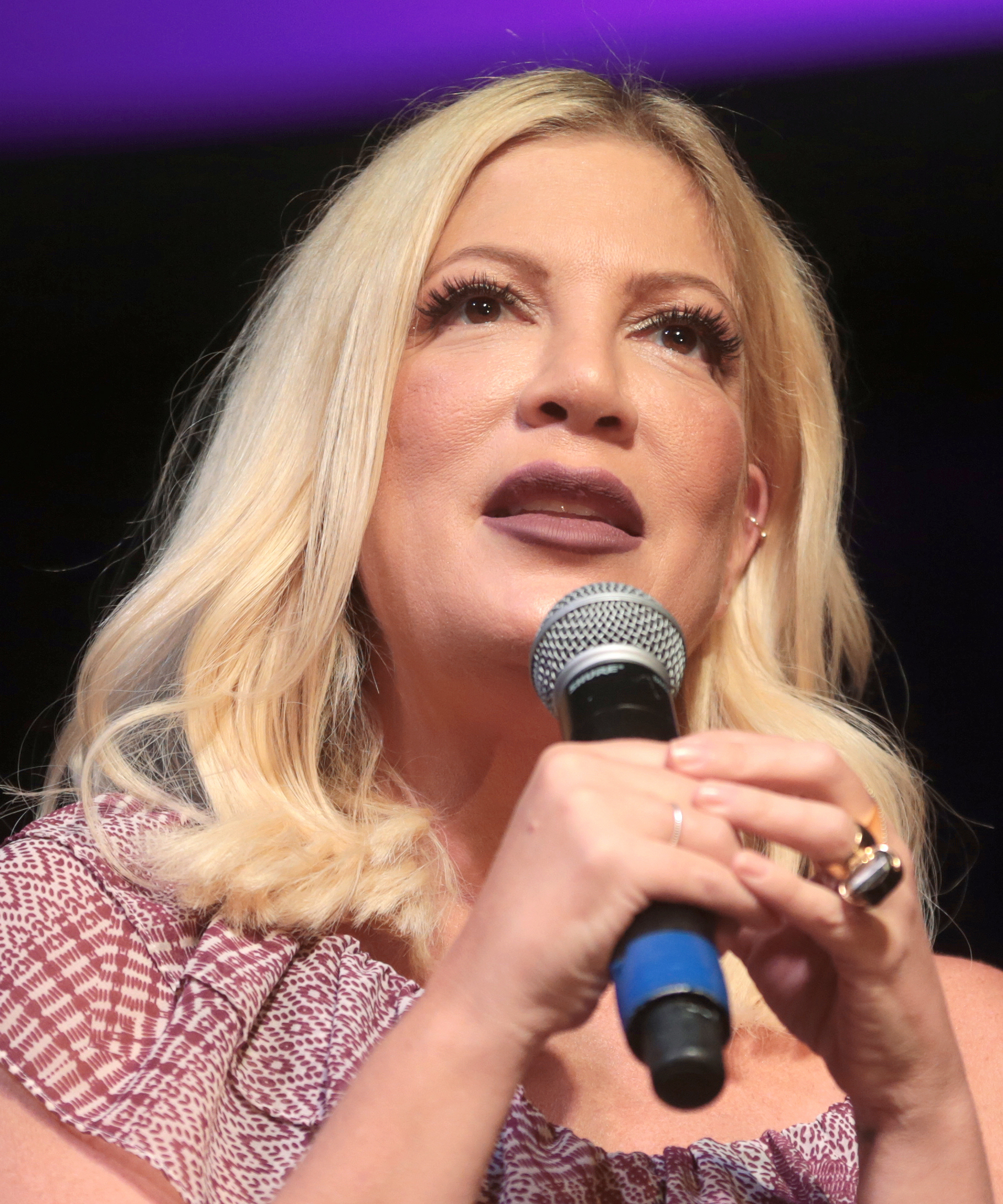
Jennie Garth (left) and Tori Spelling (right) are guest judges.

The episode originally aired on May 5, 2017.

9021-HO's introduction sequences resembles one used for the third season of 90210. Garth and Spelling reportedly "threw shade" at former co-star Tiffani Thiessen on the episode.

Nina Bo'nina Brown duck walks during the final lip-sync.

=== Fashion ===
For the fashion show, Valentina wears a green outfit inspired by Diana Ross. She has four wigs and flowers in her hair. Farrah Moan's look is a tribute to RuPaul and Dolly Parton. Trinity Taylor has a large wig. Sasha Velour has a leather jacket and a mohawk. Nina Bo'nina Brown's outfit has an animal print. Shea Couleé has a pink wig. Alexis Michelle has an Ursula-inspired black outfit. Aja wears an Alexander McQueen-inspired outfit and a large blonde wig.

== Reception ==
Oliver Sava of The A.V. Club gave the episode a rating of "B+". Writing for Vulture, Joel Kim Booster rated the episode four out of five stars. Joey Guerra of the Houston Chronicle opined, "There was so much potential for this episode to be great. But like so much of the season, it felt half-baked." Jom Elauria included 9021-HO in Screen Rant's 2022 list of the show's ten best acting main challenges.
