= Let Me Know (Tamar Braxton song) =

Single by Tamar Braxton featuring Future

from the album Calling All Lovers (Walmart edition)
- Released: October 7, 2014
- Recorded: 2014
- Genre: R&B
- Length: 3:59
- Label: Epic; Streamline Records
- Songwriters: Tamar Braxton; Al Sherrod Lambert; Ericka J. Coulter
- Producers: Tiyon "TC" Mack; Harmony Samuels

Tamar Braxton singles chronology
"For the Rest of My Life" (2013)	"Let Me Know" (2014)	"If I Don't Have You" (2015)

Future singles chronology
"Hold You Down" (2014)	"Let Me Know" (2014)	"Fuck Up Some Commas" (2015)

Music video
- "Let Me Know" on YouTube

"Let Me Know" is a song by American singer Tamar Braxton featuring American rapper Future. Epic and Streamline Records released it as a digital download on October 7, 2014. Initially promoted as the lead single from Braxton's fourth studio album Calling All Lovers, it was replaced by her 2015 release "If I Don't Have You" and was only included on the record's Walmart deluxe edition.

The song was written by Braxton, Al Sherrod "A-Rod" Lambert, and Ericka J. Coulter, and produced by Harmony "H-Money" Samuels. It is a R&B ballad, with lyrics revolving around the need for communication within a relationship. It samples the chorus of American singer Aaliyah's 1994 cover of The Isley Brothers' single "(At Your Best) You Are Love" (1976).

Critical response to "Let Me Know" was positive; several critics praised Braxton's vocals, specifically her whistle register. It peaked at number four on the Bubbling Under Hot 100 Singles Billboard chart; the single also appeared on the Hot R&B/Hip-Hop Songs and R&B/Hip-Hop Airplay Billboard charts. Braxton directed the song's music video, which featured her in various outfits. It received positive feedback from critics.

== Background and release ==
In addition to production, Mack was also the track's engineer, with Jaycen Joshua handling mixing and Gene Grimaldi serving as the mastering engineer. Ryan Kaul and Maddoxx Chhim provided additional support as assistant engineers. Jamia Nash sang background vocals. After recording her parts of the song, Braxton said that she "felt [Future] should be on it" and had her manager Vincent Herbert set up the collaboration.

Epic and Streamline Records released the song as a digital download on October 7, 2014. It was initially promoted as the lead single from Braxton's fourth studio album Calling All Lovers, but was later replaced by the 2015 track "If I Don't Have You" as its lead single. The Walmart deluxe edition of the album includes the song as a bonus track. In a 2017 interview, Braxton said that radio stations refused to play "Let Me Know" because it included a rapper. According to her, radio stations had requested a version without Future for airplay. Due to the experience, she said that she would never release a hip hop song in her future career.

== Composition and lyrics ==
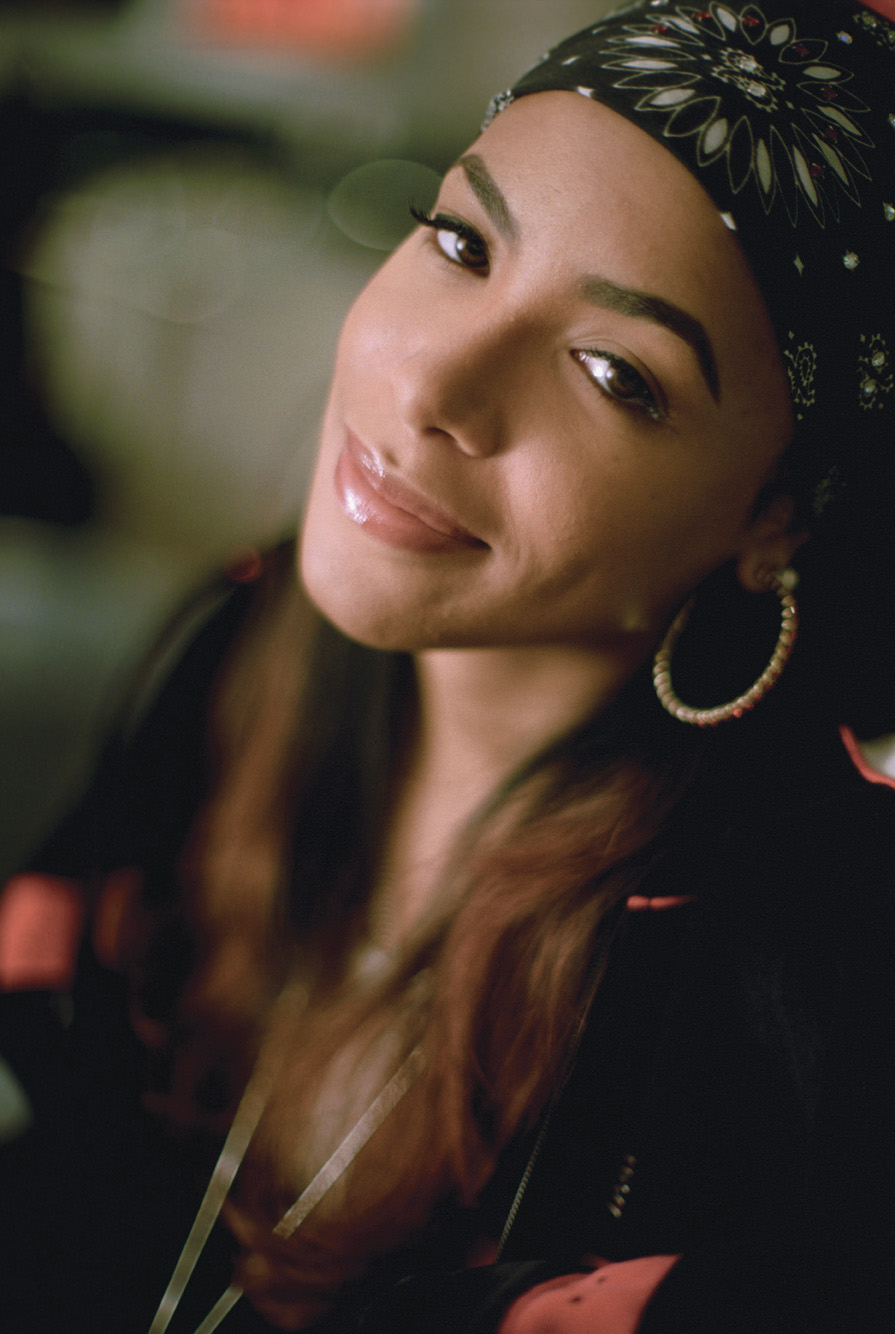
"Let Me Know" sampled the chorus from Aaliyah's 1994 cover of "(At Your Best) You Are Love"; Braxton chose to re-record the lyrics rather than include Aaliyah's vocals.

"Let Me Know" is a R&B ballad that lasts three minutes and 59 seconds. Its composition samples American singer Aaliyah's 1994 cover of The Isley Brothers' single "(At Your Best) You Are Love" (1976), by adopting the chorus "let me know". Elias Leight of Billboard described the sample as "chipmunked", or heavily edited. When discussing the reference, Braxton said that she was friends with Aaliyah through the business connections between Tamar's sister Toni Braxton and Aaliyah's uncle Barry Hankerson. She also identified herself as a fan of Aaliyah's music. Bianca Gracie of Idolator described the song as having a "smooth mid-tempo" composition. The instrumentation also includes a piano.

The song's lyrics revolve around the need for better communication between a couple. Jeff Benjamin of Fuse connected the content with Braxton's comment on the state of R&B music, when she said: "[the genre] is on the rise because we're not afraid to talk about what's really happening in our personal relationships." Throughout the song, Braxton sings lyrics to her partner such as: "We've been through so many things / Ups and downs and in-betweens / If you need more love from me / I give you more, just let me know." She also talks about love, saying: "When it's right, you don't let go" and "You don't give it up to nobody / When you love somebody." "Let Me Know" ends with Braxton singing in belts and whistle notes.

Future does not sing a separate verse, but provides the song's hook instead; his vocals are processed through Auto-Tune, which Benjamin described as part of the performer's "signature" style. Future's lyrics include: "Do you love the way I do / When I'm loving your body." Wetpaint's Afiya Augustine described Future as "the male persona to complement Tamar's lyrics of staying by her man's side no matter what".

== Reception ==
"Let Me Know"
Braxton's vocals received positive attention from reviewers; critics highlighted her use of her whistle register.

Critical reception to "Let Me Know" was primarily positive on its release. Elias Leight chose it as one of the best singles of the week, calling it Braxton's best release to date. Writing for Mic, Leight praised her inclusion of the Aaliyah sample, and her decision to work with Future, as indications of her awareness of trends in contemporary music. Tanya Rena Jefferson of AXS described "Let Me Know" as Braxton's best song from her first three studio albums. Idolator's Bradley Stern wrote that it was a strong choice as a lead single, and commended it as "a dreamy R&B ode". Stacy Lambe of The Boombox described the single as a way to "surely heat up some cold nights this winter". She complimented the "sultry" lyrics and referred to the production as a "slick beat".

Music critics praised Braxton's voice. Afiya Augustine compared it to Chanté Moore. Due to her use of whistle notes in the single, she also compared Braxton to American singer Mariah Carey, as did Jeff Benjamin, who wrote that "[she] is not playing when it comes to vocal acrobatics". Latoya Cross of Jet commended the singer's range and her connection with the song, explaining that "it's obvious she's in touch with every lyric". The collaboration between Braxton's and Future's voices received primarily positive reviews from critics, but Kevin Apaza of Direct Lyrics criticized Future's contributions as "unintelligible adlibs".

"Let Me Know" peaked at number four on the Bubbling Under Hot 100 Singles Billboard chart on February 14, 2015, and remained on the chart for 12 weeks. The same day, it reached number 31 on the Hot R&B/Hip-Hop Songs Billboard chart, and stayed on the chart for a total of 17 weeks. For the R&B/Hip-Hop Airplay Billboard chart, it peaked at number eight simultaneously, and remained on the chart for a span of 20 weeks.

== Music video and promotion ==
Braxton directed the single's accompanying music video, which premiered on October 22, 2014, on 106 & Park. On Vevo, the director is credited as "Rene & Radka". It was the first music video Braxton directed. Throughout the video, she is shown "yearning for her man to come get her loving". The singer is featured in seven looks, while wearing blonde, brunette, and black wigs. Scenes include Braxton in her bedroom, lying on a diving board, and relaxing in lingerie and fishnets. A writer for Essence wrote that the bedroom scenes featured the singer channeling Marilyn Monroe. In the latter half of the video, Braxton performs in a nude bodysuit covered with glitter. Future does not appear in the video. Braxton first performed "Let Me Know" live during the For Sisters Only concert, on October 11, 2014.

The video received a positive response from critics. A writer from Rap-Up praised it for allowing Braxton to appear "in all her diva glory," and Vibe's Sharifa Daniels felt the visual showcased Braxton's creative vision. Bradley Stern described the singer as "turn[ing] up the heat" with her wardrobe choices, and described her glitter look as "eye-popping". The glitter bodysuit was also positively received by Stacy Lambe, who felt that it was inspired by Britney Spears' music video for her 2004 single "Toxic" and Beyoncé's photoshoot for Flaunt.

== Track listing ==
Digital download
No.	Title	Length
1.	"Let Me Know (feat. Future)"	3:58

== Credits and personnel ==
Credits adapted from Tidal.

- Composer – Al Sherrod "A-Rod" Lambert, Ericka J. Coulter, and Tamar Braxton
- Lyricist – Lambert, Coulter, and Braxton
- Producer – Tiyon "TC" Mack and Harmony Samuels
- Mixing Engineer – Jaycen Joshua
- Mastering Engineer – Gene Grimaldi
- Engineer – Mack
- Vocals – Braxon and Future
- Background Vocals – Jamia Nash
- Assistant Engineer – Ryan Kaul and Maddox Chhim

== Charts ==
Chart (2014–2015)	Peak position
US Bubbling Under Hot 100 Singles (Billboard)	4
US Hot R&B/Hip-Hop Songs (Billboard)	31
US R&B/Hip-Hop Airplay (Billboard)	8

== Release history ==
Region	Date	Format	Label	Ref
Worldwide	October 7, 2014	Digital download	Epic, Streamline Records	
