= If I Don't Have You =

Single by Tamar Braxton

from the album Calling All Lovers
- Released: May 27, 2015
- Recorded: 2014
- Genre: R&B
- Length: 4:12
- Label: Epic; Streamline Records
- Songwriters: Tamar Braxton; Kevin Randolph; Tony Russell; Makeba Riddick-Woods; Ernest Clark; Marcos Palacios; LaShawn Daniels; Tiyon "TC" Mack
- Producer: Da Internz

Tamar Braxton singles chronology
"Let Me Know" (2014)	"If I Don't Have You" (2015)	"Catfish" (2015)

Music video
- "If I Don't Have You" on YouTube

"If I Don't Have You" is a song by American singer Tamar Braxton. It was released on May 27, 2015, as a digital download through Epic and Streamline Records, replacing "Let Me Know" (2014) as the lead single from Braxton's fourth studio album Calling All Lovers. The song was written by Braxton, Kevin Randolph, Tony Russell, Makeba Riddick-Woods, Ernest Clark, Marcos Palacios, LaShawn Daniels, and Tiyon "TC" Mack, while production was handled by Da Internz.

"If I Don't Have You" is a mid-tempo R&B ballad with lyrics revolving around unrequited love and the end of a relationship. Braxton said that the single was partially inspired by her past romantic relationships, and emphasized the importance of transparency with oneself. Critical response to "If I Don't Have You" was positive, with critics praising its composition. It received a nomination for the Grammy Award for Best R&B Performance at the 58th Annual Grammy Awards. The single peaked at number 18 on the Hot R&B Songs Billboard chart and number 19 on the R&B/Hip-Hop Airplay Billboard chart.

In an accompanying music video released on June 9, 2015, Braxton plays a prostitute who develops a one-sided relationship with one of her clients. The visual features American television personality NeNe Leakes as the brothel's madam. Even though the song focuses on a romantic relationship, the video does not include a male lead. The clip received positive responses from critics.

== Background and release ==
"If I Don't Have You" was written by Tamar Braxton, Kevin Randolph, Tony Russell, Makeba Riddick-Woods, Ernest Clark, Marcos Palacios, LaShawn Daniels, and Tiyon "TC" Mack; the song was produced by Da Internz. The audio was mixed by Mack, and Gene Gremaldi worked as the mastering engineer.

The song was made available on May 27, 2015, as a digital download through Epic and Streamline Records. It was promoted as the lead single from Braxton's fourth studio album Calling All Lovers. Braxton's 2014 song "Let Me Know" was initially designated as the album's lead single before it was replaced by "If I Don't Have You". The release was scheduled alongside the premiere of the fourth season of the reality television series Braxton Family Values. Prior to the release of "If I Don't Have You", Braxton had posted the hashtag "#TamartianSurprise" on her social media accounts.

== Composition and lyrics ==
"If I Don't Have You"
An audio sample of "If I Don't Have You"; Brent Faulkner of PopMatters interpreted the song as a "throwback soul record", while Kevin Apaza of Direct Lyrics called it an "emotional R&B ballad".

"If I Don't Have You" is a mid-tempo R&B ballad that lasts four minutes and 12 seconds. Brent Faulkner of PopMatters viewed the single as a "throwback soul record". The instrumental includes a piano, and the song focuses on unrequited love and the end of a relationship. Lyrics include: “You should know if I don’t have you, Rocks me to the core / I can’t love no more / If I don’t have you, know I’m done for sure / Nobody worth fighting for.” Throughout the single, Braxton uses her upper register to sing: "I can't love no more / If I don't have you / Know I'm done for sure / Nobody worth fighting for" and "I'm tired of these walls / That's on my life / I'll lose my mind if I don't have you."

According to Essence's Imani Brammer, "If I Don't Have You" functions as an "ode to vulnerability and honesty". Braxton explained: "The whole vibe of 'If I Don't Have You' is about being transparent, being aware with yourself." The singer also connected the single's content with her past romantic relationships by commenting: "I have nothing to hide about how I feel. Before I was married I kissed a lot of frogs and ogres, I talk about those experiences candidly."

== Reception ==
Critical reception towards "If I Don't Have You" was primarily positive upon its release. It received a nomination for the Grammy Award for Best R&B Performance at the 58th Annual Grammy Awards. The song received positive comparisons to Keyshia Cole's 2013 single "I Choose You" and Alicia Keys' 2003 song "You Don't Know My Name". In a review for Calling All Lovers, Diamond Hillyer of Vibe praised the song's composition as "sprightly instrumentals" that would appeal to listeners. Matthew Scott Donnelly of PopCrush wrote that the track was appropriate for those who are in "the mood for a good cry (or perhaps an all-out profound wail)". Idolator's Mike Wass praised Braxton's vocals on the single, but later reassessed "If I Don't Have You" as a "little undercooked" in comparison to other tracks on Calling All Lovers.

"If I Don't Have You" peaked at number 18 on the Hot R&B Songs Billboard chart on August 1, 2015, and remained on the chart for eight weeks. It also reached number 19 on the R&B/Hip-Hop Airplay Billboard chart on August 15, 2015, and stayed on the chart for 19 weeks.

== Music video ==
=== Background and synopsis ===
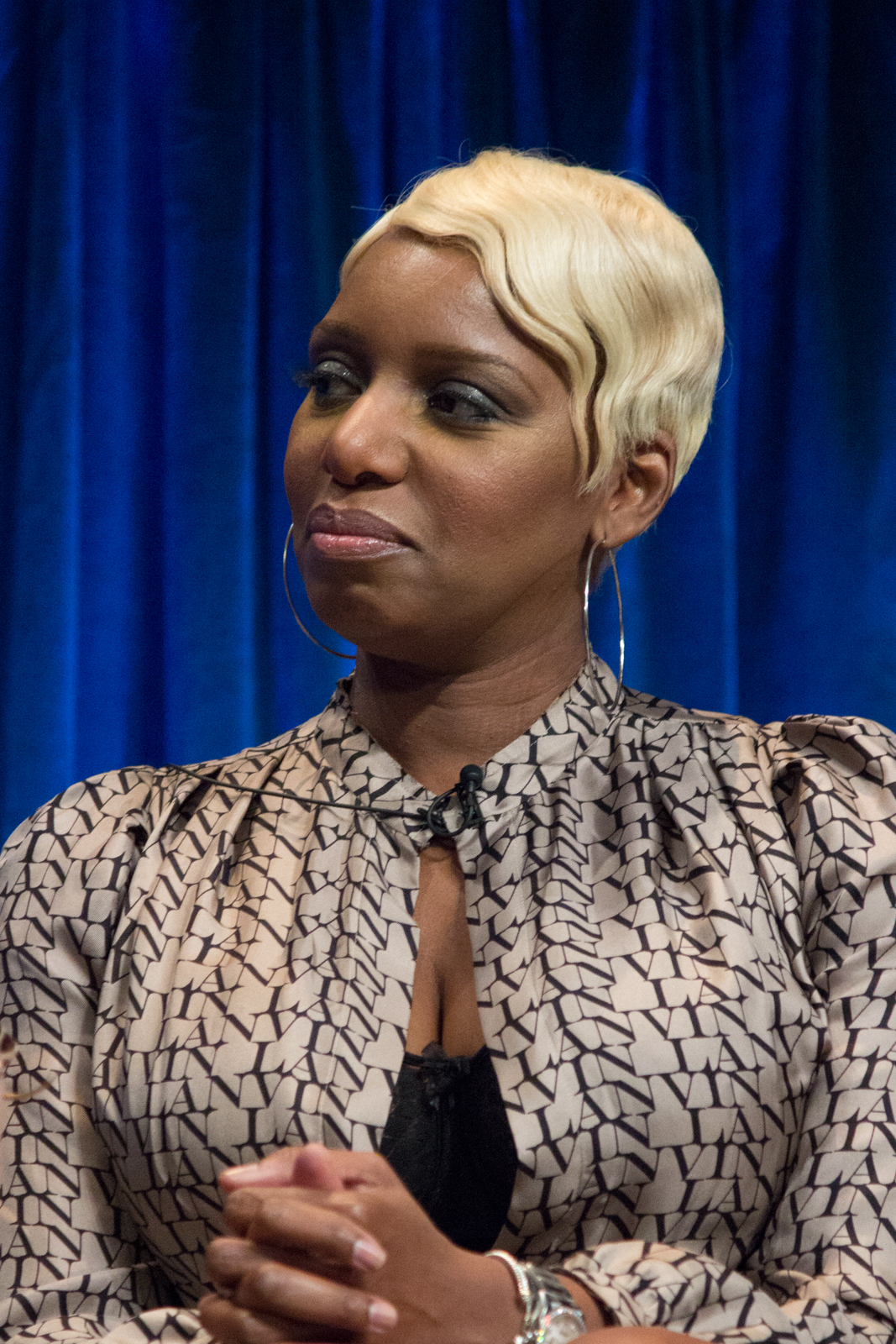
Playing the brothel's madam, NeNe Leakes provides elements of camp to the video. Braxton said that Leakes was the first person to be cast in the visuals, and she considered her to be an integral part when preparing its premise.

A lyric video for the single was released on June 11, 2015. The lyrics are displayed on a series of black-and-white newspaper clippings and colored graphics. The single's cover art also includes the chorus and the first verse. An accompanying music video, directed by Darren Craig, was made available through Braxton's Vevo account on July 9, 2015, approximately two months following the single's release. Prior to its premiere, Braxton had shown a preview on her official website.

The music video takes place in a brothel, in which the singer plays one of its prostitutes, along with her close friends Shateria Moragne-el, Khadijah Hagg, and Malika Haqq in similar roles. While discussing her character in the visual's narrative, Braxton explained "it doesn't necessarily mean that we're selling ourselves. It just means we're all looking for something". In the video, Braxton develops a one-sided relationship with one of the clients. A majority of the clip focuses on Braxton performing the song while modeling. It ends with the singer left alone while crying about her lost love. Even though the single's lyrics focus on missing a romantic partner, the video does not prominently feature a male lead. Braxton's mother also appears in the visual as one of the brothel's customers.

American television personality NeNe Leakes appears as the brothel's madam in the video's opening sequence. In the visual, Nene orders Braxton and the other women to "get on their backs and make her money". Afiya Augustine noted that Nene's performance was heavily influenced by camp. During an interview with Entertainment Tonight, Braxton said that Leakes was the first person to call to participate in the video; she explained that if Leakes was unable to play the madam, then she would have altered the entire concept for the visuals. Braxton said that she intentionally made the time period for the video ambiguous to read as either the 1930s or 2015. When writing about the video's style, Wetpaint's Afiya Augustine attributed it as having a "jazzy, art deco, 1920s feel". Sophie Schillaci of Entertainment Tonight connected the video with the 1989 film Harlem Nights.

The video received positive responses from critics. While he questioned how the visuals matched the song, Kevin Apaza of Direct Lyrics praised Braxton's wardrobe and appearance, writing that she "serv[ed] body, face and life throughout the whole of it". The clip was noted as having "diva-driven cinematic visuals" by Diamond Hillyer.

=== Live performance ===
Braxton performed "If I Don't Have You" on the BET Awards 2015, along with American singers K. Michelle and Patti LaBelle. As part of the performance, Michelle sang her 2015 single "Hard to Do" and the three artists performed LaBelle's 1983 single "If Only You Knew". The performance was noted by media outlets as ending the rivalry between Braxton and Michelle; Braxton said: “Life is all about forgiveness, love, and unity, so tonight, I’m sorry K. Michelle, and I also forgive you.” The two artists previously had disagreements after Braxton joked about Michelle's allegations that she was physically abused by her ex-boyfriend. A writer for BET described the performance as a "battle of the ballads".

== Track listing ==
Digital download
No.	Title	Length
1.	"If I Don't Have You"	4:12

== Credits and personnel ==
Credits adapted from the liner notes of Calling All Lovers.

Management

- EMI Blackwood Music Inc
- Miserable Girl Inc. (BMI)
- EMI Blackwood Music Inc
- Janice Combs Publishing and Yoga Flames Music (BMI)
- EMI April Music Inc
- The Book Productions (ASCAP)
- Sony/ATV TwoWorks (ASCAP)
- Sony/ATV Viva Panama (ASCAP)
- Sony/ATV Tunes LLC
- Make Ah Sound (ASCAP)
- Chicago Wind (ASCAP)
- BMG
- Stankin Music (ASCAP)

Personnel

- Songwriting – Tamar Braxton, Kevin Randolph, Tony Russell, Makeba Riddick-Woods, Ernest Clark, Marcos Palacios, LaShawn Daniels, and Tiyon "TC" Mack
- Production – Da Internz
- Mixing – Tiyon "TC" Mack
- Mastering engineer – Gene Gremaldi

== Charts ==
Chart (2015)	Peak position
US Hot R&B Songs (Billboard)	18
US R&B/Hip-Hop Airplay (Billboard)	19

== Release history ==
Region	Date	Format	Label	Ref
Worldwide	May 27, 2015	Digital download	Epic, Streamline Records	
