= Calling All Lovers =

- Deluxe edition cover. Standard edition uses the same cover but in a slightly different color and is no longer available for retail.

Studio album by Tamar Braxton
- Released: October 2, 2015
- Recorded: 2014–15
- Studio: Oasis Mastering (Burbank, California)
- Genre: R&B
- Length: 48:37
- Labels: Epic; Streamline
- Producers: Tamar Braxton; Afro Steve; Brandon "B.A.M." Alexander; Blac Elvis; Alessandro Calemme; Darhyl "DJ" Camper; Tiffany Fred; Gerald Haddon; Da Internz; Theophilus Antonel Edmonds; Lee Major; John Henry Gordon IV; Mel & Mus; Brian Alexander Morgan; Needlz; Donut; Polow da Don; Cedric "DaBenchWarma" Smith; Blair Taylor

Tamar Braxton chronology
Winter Loversland (2013)	Calling All Lovers (2015)	Bluebird of Happiness (2017)

Singles from Calling All Lovers
- 1. "If I Don't Have You" Released: May 27, 2015; 2. "Catfish" Released: September 11, 2015; 3. "Angels & Demons" Released: September 18, 2015

Calling All Lovers is the fourth studio album by American singer Tamar Braxton. It was released on October 2, 2015, by Epic Records and Streamline Records. The album was preceded by the release of three singles — "If I Don't Have You", "Catfish" and "Angels & Demons".

The album debuted at number five in the United States, debuting with 43,000 units (36,919 in album sales) in the United States. The album's lead single, "If I Don't Have You" was released on May 27, 2015, and was nominated for Best R&B Performance at the 58th Annual Grammy Awards, becoming Braxton's fourth nomination.

== Background and release ==
On October 7, 2014, Braxton's single, "Let Me Know" featuring Future, was released. The song peaked at number 2 on the Billboard's Trending 140 Chart, less than an hour, after its premiere on Braxton's official SoundCloud account and it eventually reached at number one by 12:00 AM. Billboard.com gave the song 4 out of 5 stars in its review of "The Best and Worst Singles of the Week" for the second week of October 2014. Braxton performed "If I Don't Have You" at the BET's 15th Annual Awards 2015 on June 28, 2015 and at Mega Fest 2015 on August 21, 2015.

On September 6, 2015, Target confirmed that Calling All Lovers would miss its scheduled release date of September 11, 2015 due to a "street date change". On September 11, 2015, the deluxe version of the album became available for pre-order on iTunes with a track listing of 16 items and a new release date of October 2, 2015. Braxton performed "King" on the daytime show, The Real on September 14, 2015. Braxton performed "Circles" on The Wendy Williams Show on October 1, 2015.

== Promotion ==
=== Singles ===
"If I Don't Have You" was released as the album's lead single on May 27, 2015, . The music video for "If I Don't Have You" was released on VEVO on July 9, 2015. The song peaked at number eighteen on the Hot R&B Songs chart on August 1, 2015 and number six on the Adult R&B Songs chart on August 15, 2015. It received a nomination for the Grammy Award for Best R&B Performance at the 58th Annual Grammy Awards.

"Catfish" was released as the second single on September 11, 2015. "Angels & Demons", was released as the third single on September 18, 2015. The music video for "Angels & Demons" was released on VEVO on September 17, 2015.

=== Other songs ===
"Circles" was released as the first promotional single from Calling All Lovers on September 25, 2015. On November 24, 2018 three years after the album release, a music video of "Love It" was released.

== Commercial performance ==
The album debuted at number 5 on the US Billboard 200, with first-week sales of 43,000 units (36,919 in album sales) in the United States. The album also peaked at number 2 on the US Top R&B/Hip-Hop Albums and number 16 on the UK R&B Albums charts.

== Critical reception ==
Professional ratings
Review scores
Source	Rating
AllMusic	3.5/5 stars

Calling All Lovers was met with generally positive reviews from music critics. Andy Kellman of AllMusic gave the album three and a half out of five stars, saying, "The album starts in scattered fashion with some neo-reggae, a retro-modern midtempo groove that evokes breakbeat-driven early-'90s productions, and a church-ified ballad. After those three songs, the album stabilizes, sliding between a number of plush ballads and sophisticated but bumping slow jams. Heartache prevails during the first half and crests with 'Never,' an authoritative and elegantly paced kiss-off of an inappreciative lover. The latter half is mostly about devotion and awe, while the back-to-back 'Love It' (all booming bass, tapping keyboards, and rattling percussion) and 'Must Be Good to You' (light and springy disco-funk) turn it up several degrees with Braxton offering firm declarations of her sexual power."

== Track listing ==
Calling All Lovers tracklisting
No.	Title	Writer(s)	Producer(s)	Length
1.	"Angels & Demons"	Tamar Braxton; Atozzio Towns; Edsel Alexander; Kameron Glasper; Tiyon "TC" Mack; Melvin Hough II; Rivelino Wouter	Mel & Mus	3:06
2.	"Catfish"	Braxton; LaShawn Daniels; Jamal Jones; Atia Boggs	Polow da Don	3:35
3.	"Simple Things"	Braxton; Daniels; Jones; Elvis Williams; Felisha King	Polow da Don; Blac Elvis	4:20
4.	"Broken Record"	Braxton; Daniels; Jones; Steven Easley; Kristal " Brave Jaxon" Murphy	Polow da Don; Afro Steve	4:09
5.	"Never"	Braxton; Brian Alexander Morgan; Candice Boyd; Mack; Patricia Austin; Peggy Lipton Jones; John Robertson; David James Wolinski	Morgan	3:09
6.	"Circles"	Braxton; Anthony D'Andre Bennett; McKenzie Brooke Lawson; Mack	Cedric "DaBenchWarma" Smith	3:25
7.	"If I Don't Have You"	Braxton; Makeba Riddick-Woods; Daniels; Ernest Clark; Marcos Palacios; Mack; Tony Russell; Kevin Randolph	Da Internz	4:14
8.	"Raise the Bar"	Braxton; Darhyl "DJ" Camper; Claude Kelly	Camper	3:43
9.	"I Love You"	Braxton; Khari "Needlz" Cain; Brandon "Donut" Bell; Tiffany Fred; Brenda Gordon Russell	Needlz; Donut	2:22
10.	"Makin' Love"	Braxton; Timothy Paul Hinshaw; Mack	Lee Major; MasBeatz	3:45
11.	"Love It"	Braxton; Keon Young; Isaac White; Vurdell "VScript" Muller; Denisia Keys; Mack	Blair Taylor	2:30
12.	"Must Be Good to You"	Braxton; Dashawn "Happie" White; Riddick-Woods; Courtney Harrell	Alessandro Calemme; White	3:12
13.	"Free Fallin'"	Braxton; Muhammed Ayers	B.A.M.	3:37
14.	"King"	Braxton; Fred	Fred; Braxton; Gerald Haddon^{[a]}	3:30
Total length:				48:37

Calling All Lovers – Deluxe edition (bonus tracks)
No.	Title	Writer(s)	Producer(s)	Length
15.	"S.O.N."	Braxton; Daniels; Larry Griffin, Jr.; Stuart Lowery; Mack	S1; Epikh Pro	3:04
16.	"Coming Home"	Braxton; Harvey Mason, Jr.; Damon Thomas; Patrick "J. Que" Smith; Dewain Whitmore; Amber Streeter	The Underdogs	4:41
Total length:				56:24

Calling All Lovers – Walmart deluxe edition (bonus tracks)
No.	Title	Writer(s)	Producer(s)	Length
15.	"S.O.N."	Braxton; Daniels; Larry Griffin, Jr.; Stuart Lowery; Mack	S1; Epikh Pro	3:04
16.	"Coming Home"	Braxton; Harvey Mason, Jr.; Damon Thomas; Patrick "J. Que" Smith; Dewain Whitmore; Amber Streeter	The Underdogs	4:41
17.	"A.S.A.P."	Braxton; Riddick-Woods; Daniels; Clark; Palacios; Mykal Snoddy	Da Internz; Snoddy	3:51
18.	"Let Me Know" (featuring Future)	Braxton; Al Sherrod "A-Rod" Lambert; Ericka Coulter; Ronald Isley; Ernie Isley; Rudolph Isley; O'Kelly Isley, Jr.; Chris Jasper	Harmony Samuels; Mack^{[b]}	3:59
Total length:				64:14

Notes

- ^{^[a]} signifies a co-producer
- ^{^[b]} signifies a vocal producer

Sample credits

- "Never" contains an interpolation of "I'm Dancing For Your Love", written by Patricia Austin, Peggy Lipton Jones, John Robertson and David James Wolinski.
- "I Love You" contains a portion of the composition "If Only for One Night", written by Brenda Gordon Russell.
- "Let Me Know" samples "(At Your Best) You Are Love" performed by Aaliyah, written by Ronald Isley, Ernie Isley, Rudolph Isley, O'Kelly Isley, Jr. and Chris Jasper.

== Credits and personnel ==
Credits adapted from AllMusic.

Performers and musicians

- Tamar Braxton – Vocals, Background
- Tiyon "TC" Mack – Vocals, Background

Technical personnel

- Tamar Braxton – Composer, Producer, Creative Director
- Antonio "L.A." Reid – Executive Producer
- Vincent Herbert – A&R, Executive Producer
- LaShawn Daniels – A&R, Composer
- Ramahn "Jer-Z" Herbert – A&R
- Ashley Fox – Creative Director
- Anita Marisa Boriboon – Art Direction, Creative Director, Design
- Theo "MasBeatz" Edmonds – Producer
- The Underdogs – Composer, Producer
- Rivelino Raoul Wouter – Producer
- Blair Taylor – Producer
- Afro Steve – Producer
- Cedric "DaBenchWarma" Smith – Producer
- Polow da Don – Producer
- Brian Alexander Morgan – Bass, Composer, Drum Programming, Keyboards, Producer
- Mel & Mus – Producer
- Melvin Hough – Producer
- Gerald Haddon – Producer
- John Henry Gordon – Producer
- Tiffany Fred – Composer, Producer
- Leigh Elliott – Producer
- Da Internz – Producer
- Brandon Bell – Composer, Producer
- Blac Elvis – Producer
- Alessandro Calemme – Producer
- Khari Cain – Composer, Producer
- Darhyl "DJ" Camper Jr. – Composer, Producer
- Tiyon Mack – Composer, Mixing, Vocal Engineer
- Keon Young – Composer
- David James Wolinski – Composer
- Dewain Whitmore, Jr. – Composer
- Isaac White – Composer
- Kristal "Brave Jaxon" Murphy
- Atozzio Towns – Composer
- Damon Thomas – Composer
- Amber Streeter – Composer
- Patrick "J Que" Smith – Composer
- Edsel Alexander – Composer
- Makeba Riddick – Composer
- Tony Russell – Composer
- Muhammad Ayers – Composer
- Brenda Russell – Composer
- Marcos Palacios – Composer
- Vurdell Muller – Composer
- McKenzie Brooke Lawson – Composer
- Sherita Lowery – Composer
- Kevin Randolph – Composer
- Peggy Lipton Jones – Composer
- Denisia Keys – Composer
- Claude Kelly – Composer
- Jamal Jones – Composer
- Andrew Hey – Engineer, Guitar
- Patricia Austin – Composer
- Timothy Paul Hinshaw – Composer
- Atia Boggs – Composer
- Courtney Harrell – Composer
- Anthony D. Bennett – Composer
- Ernest Clark – Composer
- Candice Boyd – Composer
- Larry Griffin Jr. – Composer
- Kameron Glasper – Composer
- Gene Grimaldi – Mastering
- Dave Boyd – Assistant
- Brandon N. Caddell – Mixing
- Zach Nicholls – Mixing
- Harvey Mason, Jr. – Composer, Mixing
- Dashawn "Happie" White – Composer, Producer
- Robert Ector – Photography

== Charts ==
=== Weekly charts ===
Chart (2015)	Peak position
UK Digital Albums (Official Charts Company)	69
UK R&B Albums (Official Charts Company)	16
US Billboard 200	5
US Top R&B/Hip-Hop Albums (Billboard)	2

=== Year-end charts ===
Chart (2015)	Position
US Top R&B/Hip-Hop Albums (Billboard)	71
Chart (2016)	Position
US Top R&B/Hip-Hop Albums (Billboard)	97

== Release history ==
Region	Date	Format	Label	Ref
Australia	October 2, 2015	Digital download	Epic; Streamline	
New Zealand	October 2, 2015	Digital download	Epic; Streamline	
United Kingdom	October 2, 2015	Digital download	Epic; Streamline	
United States	October 2, 2015	Digital download	Epic; Streamline	
United States	October 2, 2015	CD	Epic; Streamline	
