= Trap Beckham =

American rapper

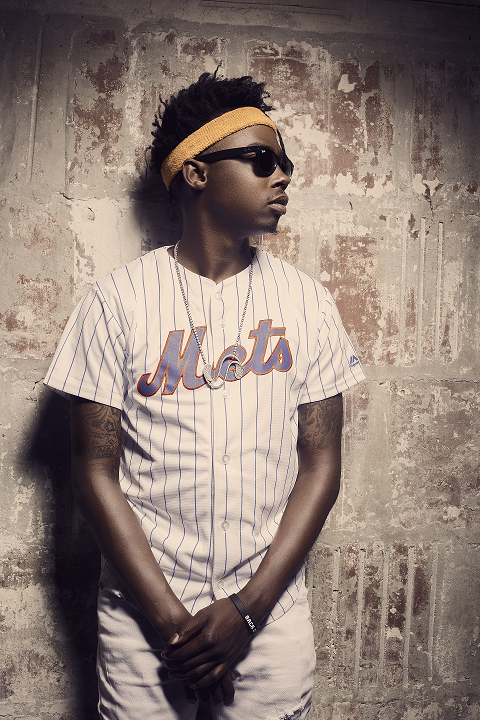
- Beckham in a promotional photo

Background information
- Also known as: Trap Beckham
- Born: Travis Cave; July 14, 1991 (age 34); Jacksonville, Florida, U.S.
- Genres: Southern hip-hop; trap
- Occupations: Rapper; songwriter
- Instrument: Vocals
- Years active: 2012–present
- Label: Def Jam
- Website: trapbeckham.com

Travis Cave (born July 14, 1991), better known by his stage name Trap Beckham, is an American rapper from Jacksonville, Florida. He is best known for his 2016 single "Birthday Chick".

== Early life ==
Beckham began writing music when he was eight years old and began recording at age 12 with a tape recorder his mother gave him. He began using software to record music age 14 and in high school began promoting his music with a small group of promoters he created. He is influenced by Michael Jackson and Prince.

== Career ==
Beckham began his career on the local music scene in Jacksonville. Two of his singles, "Top of the Line" and "Ohh She Thick", helped launch his career after winning numerous awards and touring the local college scene. During his early career he earned the nickname "The Golden Boy of the Hood."

Beckham released his single "Top of the Line" in 2012. The song was on his mixtape 7.14.12 and featured Young Cash. 7.14.12 was one of three mixtapes released on his birthday, July 14, and is now part of a mixtape collection with him releasing a new one on the same day each year. He has also earned Artist, Song, Mixtape, and Performer of the year from Duval Diamond Awards in each year between 2012 and 2015.

Beckham signed with Def Jam Recordings in 2016 and also released the single "Birthday Chick". The song was compared to Juvenile's "Back That Azz Up" and Jeremih's "Birthday Sex" by HotNewHipHop. "Birthday Chick" was featured on Season 1 Episode 8 of HBO's series Insecure.

In October 2017, Beckham released his debut EP with Def Jam Recordings called Life is Lit. It featured his single "Lil Booties Matter" and skits by D.C. Young Fly.

== Discography ==
=== Mixtapes ===
Title	Album details
7.14.16	Released: July 14, 2016; Label: Def Jam Recordings; Format: Digital download
7.14.15	Released: July 14, 2015; Label: Independent; Format: Digital download
7.14.14	Released: July 14, 2014; Label: Independent; Format: Digital download
7.14.13	Released: July 14, 2013; Label: Independent; Format: Digital download
7.14.12	Released: July 14, 2012; Label: Independent; Format: Digital download

=== Singles ===
Title	Year	Peak chart positions	Album
Title	Year	Billboard	Album
Back It Up (with Flo Milli)	2020	—	Non-album single release
Litty Christmas	2019	—	Non-album single release
Birthday Chick	2016	—	Non-album single release
Top of the Line	2012	—	Non-album singles
Ohh She Thick	2012	—	Non-album singles

=== EPs ===
Title	EP details
Life is Lit	Released: October 20, 2017; Label: Def Jam Recordings; Format: Digital download
