= RuPaul Roast (RuPaul's Drag Race season 9) =

- RuPaul's Drag Race episode
- Episode no.: Season 9 Episode 8
- Presented by: RuPaul
- Original air date: May 12, 2017

Guest appearances
- Tamar Braxton; Fortune Feimster

Episode chronology
← Previous "9021-HO"	Next → "Your Pilot's on Fire"
- RuPaul's Drag Race season 9

"RuPaul Roast " is the eighth episode of the ninth season of the American television series RuPaul's Drag Race. It originally aired on May 12, 2017. The episode's main challenge tasks the contestants with performing in a roast of Michelle Visage. Tamar Braxton and Fortune Feimster are guest judges. Peppermint wins the main challenge. Farrah Moan is eliminated from the competition after placing in the bottom and losing a lip-sync contest against Alexis Michelle to "Baby I'm Burnin'" by Dolly Parton.

== Episode ==
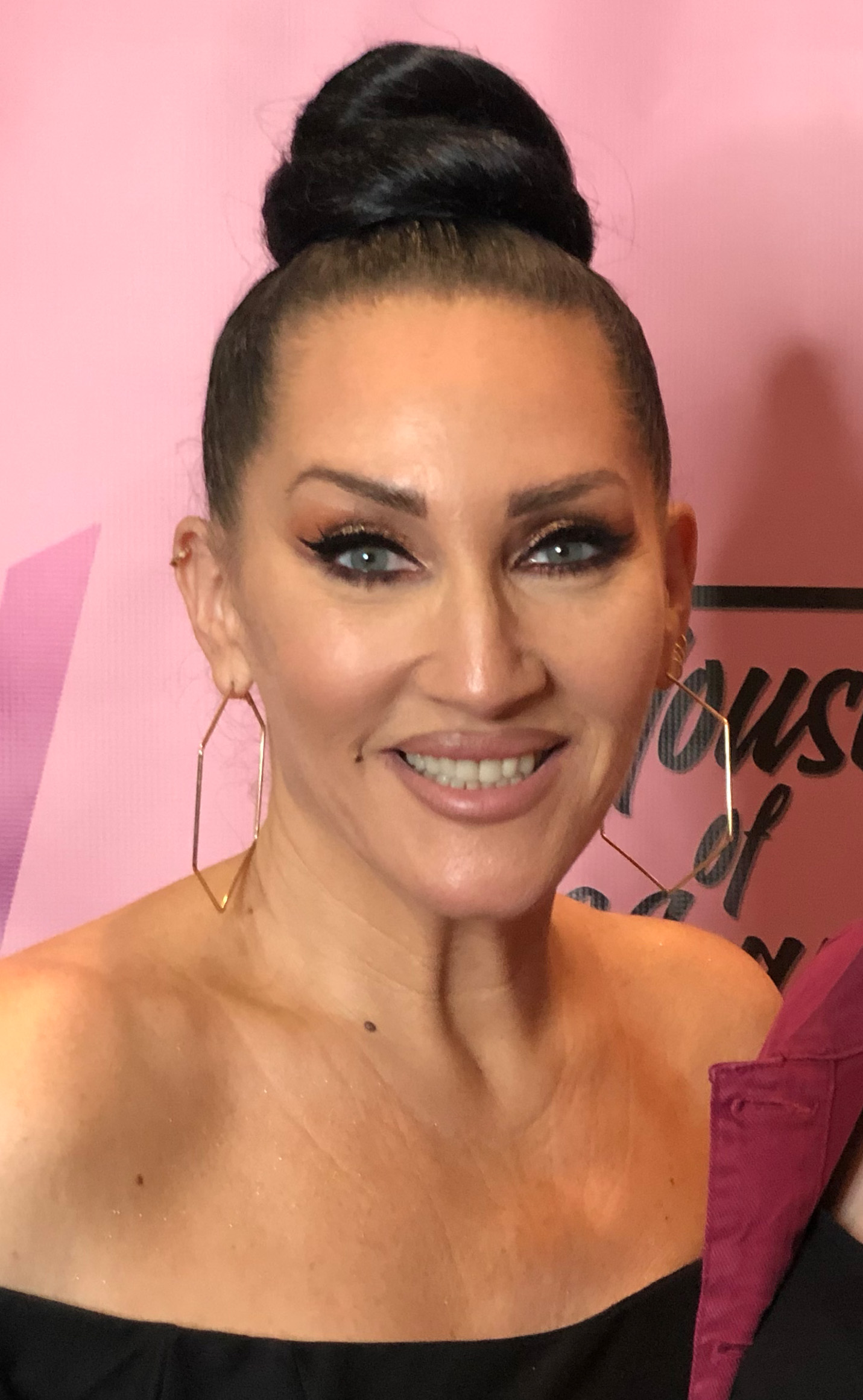
The episode's main challenge has contestants roast judge Michelle Visage (pictured in 2018).

The contestants return to the workroom after Aja's elimination on the previous episode. On a new day, RuPaul greets the group and reveals the mini-challenge, which tasks the contestants with "reading" (playfully insulting) each other. Valentina wins the mini-challenge. RuPaul then reveals the main challenge, which tasks the contestants with performing in a roast of Michelle Visage in front of the judges and a live audience. Valentina is tasked with assigning the order. After Valentina announces the order, the contestants begin to write jokes and prepare for the show. Alexis Michelle shares that she is upset from comments made about her during the mini-challenge.

RuPaul and Ross Mathews return to the workroom to meet with each contestants, offering advice and asking questions. On elimination day, the contestants make final preparations for the roast. Sasha Velour discusses her experience living in Russia. Peppermint discusses her experience being detained at an airport in order to prove her gender.

On the main stage, RuPaul welcomes fellow judges Visage and Mathews, as well as guest judges Tamar Braxton and Fortune Feimster. RuPaul shares the contestants' assignment, surprising Visage, then the roast commences. The judges deliver their critiques, deliberate, then share the results with the group. Peppermint, Sasha Velour, and Shea Couleé receive positive critiques, and Peppermint wins the challenge. Alexis Michelle, Farrah Moan, and Trinity Taylor receive negative critiques, and Trinity Taylor is deemed safe. Alexis Michelle and Farrah Moan place in the bottom and face off in a lip-sync contest to "Baby I'm Burnin'" (1978) by Dolly Parton. Alexis Michelle wins the lip-sync and Farrah Moan is eliminated from the competition.

== Production and broadcast ==
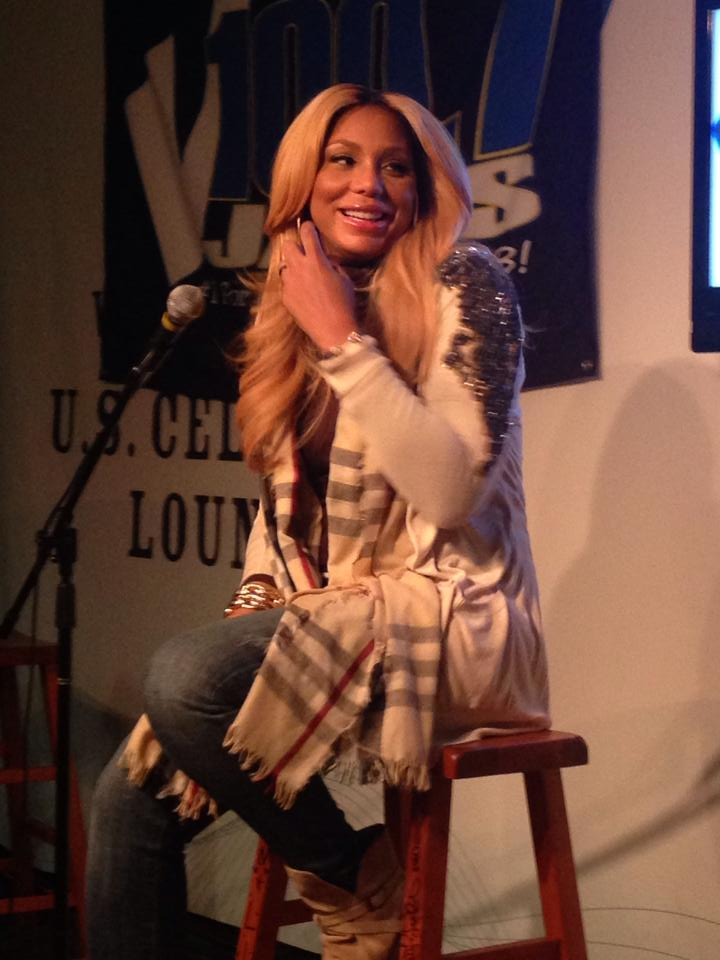
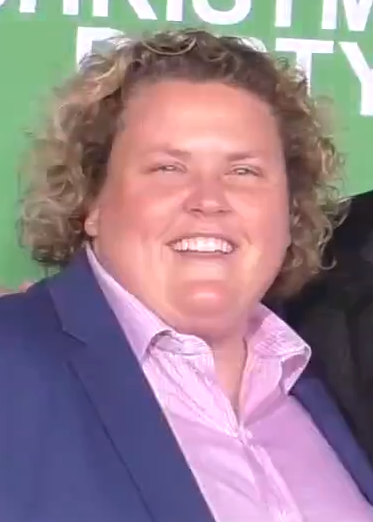
Tamar Braxton (left) and Fortune Feimster (right) are guest judges.

The episode originally aired on May 12, 2017.

On the main stage, Alexis Michelle asks Braxton, "Well, Tamar, have you watched the show?"

=== Fashion ===
Shea Couleé's outfit is black. Sasha Velour has a black-and-white outfit and a red hat. Farrah Moan wears a pink wig. Peppermint has a blue dress, large earrings, and a brown wig. Alexis Michelle's skin is colored green and her dress is green.

== Reception and impact ==
Oliver Sava of The A.V. Club gave the episode a rating of 'C'. Joey Guerra of the Houston Chronicle said Peppermint delivered "arguably the greatest read in the show's herstory"; Peppermint said, "Not since Destiny’s Child has a Michelle become so famous for riding somebody else’s coattails."

Parton's recording of "Baby I'm Burnin'" saw a 2,114 percent increase in combined streams in the U.S. for the week ending May 18, 2017. Kevin O'Keeffe ranked the "Baby I'm Burnin'" performance number 74 in INTO Magazine's 2018 "definitive ranking" of the show's lip-sync contests to date.
