= Bluebird of Happiness =

Bluebird of Happiness may refer to:

- "Bluebird of Happiness" (song), Jan Peerce (1934)
- Bluebird of Happiness (album), Tamar Braxton (2017)
- Bluebird of happiness, in folklore
