= Mr. P =

Mr. P may refer to:

- Mr. P (album), a live album by Patrice O'Neal
- Mr. P (singer) (Peter Okoye, born 1981), Nigerian singer, songwriter and producer
- "Mr. P", a ring name used by wrester John Cena
- Mr.P , a mythic brawler in Brawl stars

== See also ==
- Master P, Percy Robert Miller Sr. (born 1970), American rapper and record producer
