= BadBadNotGood production discography =

The following is the production discography of Canadian instrumental group and production team BadBadNotGood. Formed in 2010, the group has been producing music for other artists since 2012 and are known for their jazz-influenced compositions in hip hop, R&B, and electronic music.

They commonly co-produce and write with Canadian producers Frank Dukes and Kaytranada, and work in an informal Toronto-based collective of songwriters that includes artists Charlotte Day Wilson, River Tiber, and Daniel Caesar, among others. While they most commonly compose in collaboration with other producers, the band is credited as the sole producer for songs by artists including Earl Sweatshirt, Mick Jenkins, and Kali Uchis ("After the Storm"). They also have numerous production and songwriting credits as a sampled artist.

== Charting songs ==
Title	Year	Artist	Album	Peak chart positions					Certifications	Production notes
Title	Year	Artist	Album	US	CAN	US R&B	US R&B/ Hip-Hop	US Adult R&B	Certifications	Production notes
"Get You" (featuring Kali Uchis)	2016	Daniel Caesar	Get You – Single	93	—	5	41	1	RIAA: 4× Platinum; MC: 4× Platinum; BPI: Gold	Produced with Jordan Evans and Matthew Burnett
"Japanese Denim"	2016	Daniel Caesar	Get You – Single	—	—	—	—	13	RIAA: Platinum; MC: Platinum	Produced with Jordan Evans and Matthew Burnett
"Lust"	2017	Kendrick Lamar	Damn	43	35	—	25	—	RIAA: Gold; MC: Platinum	Produced with DJ Dahi and Sounwave
"After the Storm" (featuring Tyler, the Creator and Bootsy Collins)	2018	Kali Uchis	Isolation	—	—	16	—	—	RIAA: Platinum; BPI: Silver	
"The Ways"	2018	Khalid and Swae Lee	Black Panther	63	53	5	31	—		Produced with Kendrick Lamar and Sounwave
"Please Do Not Lean" (feat. BadBadNotGood)	2022	Daniel Caesar	NEVER ENOUGH	—	—	20	—	—		Produced with Jordan Evans, Matthew Burnett, and Alex Ernewein

== 2011 ==
=== BadBadNotGood – BBNG ===
- 01. "Based Is How You Feel Inside"
- 02. "Fall in Love" (Slum Village cover)
- 03. "Improvised Jam"
- 04. "Mass Appeal / Transmission" (Gang Starr / Joy Division cover)
- 05. "I Got a Bad Feeling About This"
- 06. "Salmonella"
- 07. "Freedom / Billium Evans"
- 08. "The World Is Yours / Brooklyn Zoo" (Nas / Ol' Dirty Bastard cover)
- 09. "Listeriosis"
- 10. "Camel" (Flying Lotus cover)
- 11. "Title Theme / Saria's Song / Song of Storms" (The Legend of Zelda medley)
- 12. "Outro / Glasper"

=== BadBadNotGood – "DOOM" single ===
- 01. "DOOM" (MF Doom medley "Supervillain Theme," "Fazers," and "Vomitspit")

=== BadBadNotGood – BBNGSINGLE ===
- 01. "Rotten Decay"
- 02. "Hard in Da Paint / Wow Rare" (Waka Flocka Flame cover)

== 2012 ==
=== Various artists – The Man with the Iron Fists ===
- 05. "Get Your Way (Sex Is a Weapon)" – performed by Idle Warship (produced with Frank Dukes)
- 06. "Rivers of Blood" – performed by Wu-Tang Clan and Kool G Rap (produced with Frank Dukes)

=== BadBadNotGood – BBNG2 ===
- 01. "Earl" (featuring Leland Whitty) (Earl Sweatshirt cover)
- 02. "Vices"
- 03. "Rotten Decay"
- 04. "Limit to Your Love" (Feist / James Blake cover)
- 05. "Bastard/Lemonade" (Tyler, the Creator / Gucci Mane cover)
- 06. "CHSTR"
- 07. "UWM" (featuring Leland Whitty)
- 08. "DMZ"
- 09. "CMYK" (James Blake cover)
- 10. "Flashing Lights" (Kanye West cover)
- 11. "You Made Me Realise" (feat. Luan Phung) (My Bloody Valentine cover)

== 2013 ==
=== Alexander Spit – A Breathtaking Trip To That Other Side ===
- 00. "A Breathtaking Trip" (Live at Red Bull Studios) (featuring BadBadNotGood & Bago) (live version)

=== JJ Doom – Key to the Kuffs (Butter Edition) ===
- 19. "Guv'nor (BadBadNotGood Version)" (later included on JJ Doom's 2014 EP Bookhead)

=== Earl Sweatshirt – Doris ===
- 14. "Hoarse"

=== Danny Brown – Old ===
- 19. "Float On" (featuring Charli XCX) (produced with Frank Dukes)

== 2014 ==
=== III ===
- 1. "Triangle" (produced with Frank Dukes)
- 2. "Can't Leave the Night" (produced with Frank Dukes)
- 3. "Confessions" (featuring Leland Whitty) (produced with Frank Dukes)
- 4. "Kaleidoscope" (produced with Frank Dukes)
- 5. "Eyes Closed" (produced with Frank Dukes)
- 6. "Hedron" (produced with Frank Dukes)
- 07. "Differently, Still" (produced with Frank Dukes)
- 08. "Since You Asked Kindly" (produced with Frank Dukes)
- 09. "CS60" (produced with Frank Dukes)
- 10. "Sustain" (produced with Frank Dukes)
- 00. "Shame (BBNG Remix)" (Bonus Track – Rappcats Edition) (Freddie Gibbs & Madlib cover)
- 00. "Triangle" (Live in the Red Bull Studio LA) (promotional single)
- 00. "Can't Leave the Night" (Live in the Red Bull Studio LA) (promotional single)

=== Black Milk & BadBadNotGood – "Now or Never" single ===
- 01. "Now or Never"

=== Future Islands – "Seasons (Waiting on You) (BBNG Reinterpretation)" single ===
- 01. "Seasons (Waiting on You) BadBadNotGood Reinterpretation"

== 2015 ==
=== BadBadNotGood – "Velvet / Boogie No. 69" single ===
- 01. "Velvet"
- 02. "Boogie No. 69"

=== Ghostface Killah & BadBadNotGood – Sour Soul ===
- 01. "Mono" (produced with Frank Dukes)
- 02. "Sour Soul" (produced with Frank Dukes)
- 03. "Six Degrees" (featuring Danny Brown) (produced with Frank Dukes)
- 04. "Gunshowers" (featuring Elzhi) (produced with Frank Dukes)
- 05. "Stark's Reality" (produced with Frank Dukes)
- 06. "Tone's Rap" (produced with Frank Dukes)
- 07. "Mind Playing Tricks" (produced with Frank Dukes)
- 08. "Street Knowledge" (featuring TREE) (produced with Frank Dukes)
- 09. "Ray Gun" (featuring MF Doom) (produced with Frank Dukes)
- 10. "Nuggets of Wisdom" (produced with Frank Dukes)
- 11. "Food" (produced with Frank Dukes)
- 12. "Experience" (produced with Frank Dukes)

=== Marvel Alexander – Don't Die Yet ===
- 01. "Untitled"

=== Dornik – "Drive (BBNG Remix)" single ===
- 01. "Drive (BadBadNotGood Remix)" (originally produced by Dornik, Andrew Wansel, Ronald Colson, and Jameel Roberts)

=== Daniel Caesar – Pilgrims's Paradise ===
- 03. "Paradise" (featuring BadBadNotGood and Sean Leon)

=== Kali Uchis – Por Vida ===
- 06. "Rush" (produced with Kaytranada=== composer)

== 2016 ==
=== Little Simz – Stillness in Wonderland ===
- 16. "Our Conversations" (featuring BadBadNotGood) (produced with Brendon Harding and Little Simz)
- 00. "Our Conversations" (Live – Red Bull 20 Before 16)

=== Jaime Woon – "Sharpness (KAYTRANADA Remix)" single ===
- 01. "Sharpness [KAYTRANADA Remix ft. BadBadNotGood]" (remix production by Kaytranada=== additional production credit)

=== Mick Jenkins – various singles ===
- "On the Map" (cover of TheSenseiBlue)
- "The Artful Dodger" single (sampled artist) (produced by Kaytranada and THEMPeople)

=== Jerry Paper & Easy Feelings Unlimited ===
Toon Time Raw!

- 01. In The Puzzle Room (produced with Jerry Paper)
- 02. Ginger & Ruth (produced with Jerry Paper)
- 03. Zoom Out (produced with Jerry Paper)
- 04. Kill The Dream (produced with Jerry Paper)
- 05. Stargazers (produced with Jerry Paper)
- 06. Benny Knows (produced with Jerry Paper)
- 07. Gracie (produced with Jerry Paper)
- 08. Comma For Cow (produced with Jerry Paper)
- 09. Elastic Last Act (produced with Jerry Paper)
- 10. Hijinks Ensue (produced with Jerry Paper)
- 11. Shouldn't You Be Laughing (produced with Jerry Paper)
- 12. Jumbo Ron (produced with Jerry Paper)
- 12. Plans (produced with Jerry Paper)
- 12. Nirvana Mañana (produced with Jerry Paper)

=== Snoh Aalegra – Don't Explain ===
- 02. "In Your River" (sampled artist - samples "Stark's Reality" from Sour Soul) (produced by Christian Rich)

=== KAYTRANADA – 99.9% ===
- 06. "Weight Off (featuring BadBadNotGood)" (produced with Kaytranada)
- 15. "Bullets" (featuring Little Dragon) (songwriting credit only=== produced by Kaytranada)

=== Stwo – D.T.S.N.T. EP ===
- 07. "All Alone (featuring Shay Lia and BadBadNotGood)" (produced with Stwo)

=== GoldLink – "Fall in Love" single ===
- 01. "Fall in Love" (featuring Cisero) (co-producer credit=== produced with Kaytranda)

=== BadBadNotGood ===
IV

- 01. "And That, Too."
- 02. "Speaking Gently"
- 03. "Time Moves Slow" (featuring Sam Herring)
- 04. "Confessions Pt II" (featuring Colin Stetson)
- 05. "Lavender" (featuring Kaytranada) (produced with Kaytranada)
- 06. "Chompy's Paradise"
- 07. "IV"
- 08. "Hyssop of Love" (featuring Mick Jenkins)
- 09. "Structure No. 3"
- 10. "In Your Eyes" (featuring Charlotte Day Wilson)
- 11."Cashmere"
- 12. "Up" (Bonus Track – Japan Edition)

=== "Here & Now / Timewave Zero" single ===
- 01. "Here & Now"
- 02. "Timewave Zero"

=== Mick Jenkins – The Healing Component ===
- 06. "Drowning" (featuring BadBadNotGood)

=== Daniel Caesar – Get You – Single ===
- 01. "Get You" (featuring Kali Uchis) (produced with Jordan Evans and Matthew Burnett=== additional production credit)
- 02. "Japanese Denim"

=== Hodgy – Fireplace: TheNotTheOtherSide ===
- 10. "Tape Beat" (featuring Lil Wayne)

== 2017 ==
=== Matt Martians – "28" single ===
- 01. "28" (produced with Kaytranada)

=== Denzel Curry – Ultimate / Sick & Tired (BadBadNotGood Sessions) ===
- 01. "Ultimate (BBNG Sessions)"
- 02. "Sick and Tired (BBNG Sessions)"

=== Freddie Gibbs – You Only Live 2wice ===
- 02. "Alexys" (produced with Kaytranada)

=== Kendrick Lamar – Damn ===
- 09. "Lust" (produced with DJ Dahi and Sounwave=== composer)

=== Mary J. Blige – Strength of a Woman ===
- 12. "Telling the Truth" (produced with Kaytranada)

=== BadBadNotGood – Late Night Tales: BadBadNotGood ===
- 19. "To You" (Andy Shauf cover)

=== BadBadNotGood – "Confessions, Pt. III" single ===
- 01. "Confessions, Pt. III" (featuring Colin Stetson)

=== Snoop Dogg – Neva Left ===
- 11. "Lavender [Nightfall Remix]" (featuring BadBadNotGood and Kaytranada) (sampled artist=== samples "Lavender" from IV) (produced with Kaytranada)

=== Samuel T. Herring & BadBadNotGood – "I Don't Know" single ===
- 01. "I Don't Know"

=== Flockey Ocscor – "BBNG X FLOCKEY OCSCOR" single ===
- 01. "BBNG X FLOCKEY OCSCOR" (remix medley released by BBNG=== samples "Cashmere"/"Chompy's Paradise"/"And That, Too" from IV)

== 2018 ==
=== Kali Uchis – Isolation ===
- 13. "After the Storm" (featuring Tyler, the Creator and Bootsy Collins)
- 00. "After the Storm (Pete Rock Remix)" (featuring Tyler, the Creator and Bootsy Collins)

=== Lou Phelps – 002:Love Me ===
- 05. "Miss Phatty" (produced with Kaytranada=== additional production credit)

=== Various artists – Black Panther soundtrack ===
- 04. "The Ways" – performed by Khalid and Swae Lee (produced with Kendrick Lamar and Sounwave=== composer)

=== Charlotte Day Wilson – Stone Woman EP ===
- 01. "Stone Woman" (produced with Charlotte Day Wilson)
- 02. "Doubt" (produced with Charlotte Day Wilson)
- 04. "Let You Down" (credited as musician=== produced by Charlotte Day Wilson and Duncan Hood)
- 05. "Falling Apart"
- 06. "Funeral" (credited as musician=== produced by Charlotte Day Wilson and Alex Ernewein)

=== Matty – Déjàvu ===
Note, production and songwriting by BBNG member Tavares with instrumentation by BBNG, et al.

- 01. "Embarrassed" (produced with Frank Dukes)
- 02. "Verocai" (produced with Frank Dukes)
- 03. "How Can He be" (produced with Frank Dukes)
- 04. "I'll Gladly Place Myself Below You" (produced with Frank Dukes)
- 05. "Cheer" (produced with Frank Dukes)
- 06. "Polished" (produced with Frank Dukes)
- 07. "Nothing, yet" (produced with Frank Dukes)
- 08. "Butter" (produced with Frank Dukes)
- 09. "Déjávu" (produced with Frank Dukes)
- 10. "Verocai Pt. II" (Mr Bongo Exclusive) (produced with Frank Dukes)

=== Mick Jenkins – Pieces of a Man ===
- 09. "Padded Locks" (featuring Ghostface Killah) (sampled artist=== samples "Speaking Gently" from IV) (produced by Kaytranada)
- 16. "Understood" (produced by Alex Sowinski with Kaytranada)
- 17. "Smoking Song" (featuring BadBadNotGood)"

Frank Dukes – Frank Dukes Presents Vapores 7" single

- 01. "I See You" (produced with Frank Dukes)
- 02. "Inventions" (produced with Frank Dukes)

=== Little Dragon & BadBadNotGood – "Tried" single ===
- 01. "Tried"
- 02. "Tried (Instrumental)"

== 2019 ==
=== Shay Lia – Dangerous ===
- 03. "Blue" (featuring BadBadNotGood & Kaytranada) (produced with Kaytranada)
- 08. "Blue (Remix)" (featuring Shaun Ross) (produced with Kaytranada)

=== Sesame Street – "Give it, Live it, RESPECT" single ===
- 01. "Give it, Live it, RESPECT" (featuring Common) (produced with Kaytranada)

=== Jonah Yano – nervous EP ===
- 01. "Nervous" (featuring BadBadNotGood)

=== BadBadNotGood – "Key to Love (Is Understanding)" split single ===
- 01. "Key to Love (Is Understanding)" (featuring Jonah Yano) (Majestics cover)

== 2020 ==
=== Thundercat] – It Is What It Is ===
- 11. "King of the Hill"* (produced with Flying Lotus) (originally released on 2018 compilation Brainfeeder X)

=== BadBadNotGood – "Goodbye Blue" single ===
- 01. "Goodbye Blue" (with Jonah Yano)
- 02. "Glide (Goodbye Blue Pt. 2)"

=== MF Doom& BadBadNotGood – "The Chocolate Conquistadors (From Grand Theft Auto Online: The Cayo Perico Heist)" single ===
- 01. "The Chocolate Conquistadors" (Johnny Hammond cover)
- 02. "The Chocolate Conquistadors (Instrumental)" (Johnny Hammond cover)

== 2021 ==
=== Nick Hakim – WILL THIS MAKE ME GOOD (The Remixes) ===
- 05. "Qadir - BadBadNotGood Remix"*

=== TOBi – "Don't Touch" single ===
- 00. "Don't Touch"* (produced with Kaytranada)

=== Various artists – Truth to Power ===
- B2. “Black Moon Rising (BadBadNotGood Remix)" (performed by Black Pumas)

=== VANO 3000 – "Running Away" single ===
- 01. "Running Away" (with BadBadNotGood & Samuel T. Herring) (sampled artist=== samples "Time Moves Slow" from IV)
- 02. "Running Away - Vocal Remix" (with BadBadNotGood & Samuel T. Herring)

=== Brittany Howard – Jaime (Reimagined) ===
- 06. "Tomorrow - BadBadNotGood Remix"*

=== Charlotte Day Wilson – Alpha ===
- 02. "I Can Only Whisper"* (songwriting credit only=== produced by Wilson with Tommy Brenneck)

=== BadBadNotGood – Talk Memory ===
- 01. "Signal to the Noise"* (produced with Floating Points)
- 02. “Unfolding (Momentum 73)” (featuring Laraajii)
- 03. “City of Mirrors” (featuring Arthur Verocai)
- 04. “Beside April” (featuring Karriem Riggins & Arthur Verocai)*
- 05. “Love Proceeding” (featuring Arthur Verocai)
- 06. “Open Channels”*
- 07. “Timid, Intimidating”
- 08. “Beside April Reprise” (featuring Arthur Verocai)
- 09. “Talk Meaning” (featuring Arthur Verocai, Terrace Martin, & Brandee Younger)
- 00. “Unfolding (Momentum 73)” (featuring Laraajii) [Ron Trent Remix]*
- 00. “Love Proceeding” (featuring Arthur Verocai) [Macroblank Remix]*

=== Skiifall & BadBadNotGood – "Break of Dawn" single ===
- 00. "Break of Dawn" (produced with The Kount & Yama//Sato)*

== 2022 ==
=== Daniel Caesar – TBA ===
- 00. "Please Do Not Lean" (feat. BadBadNotGood)* (produced with Jordan Evans, Matthew Burnett, and Alex Ernewein)

=== Lil Silva – Yesterday is Heavy ===
- 06. "To The Floor" (feat. BadBadNotGood)* (produced with Lil Silva & Mansur Brown)

=== JID – The Forever Story ===
- 11. "Stars" (feat. Yasiin Bey) (produced with E. Jones & Christo)

== 2023 ==
=== Jonah Yano – Portrait of a Dog ===
- 01. "Leslianne"
- 02. "Always"*
- 03. "Haven't Haven't"
- 04. "Portrait of a Dog"
- 05. "Call the Number"
- 06. "The Speed of Sound!"*
- 07. "In Sun, Out of Sun" (feat. Slauson Malone)
- 08. "So Sweet"
- 09. "Glow Worms"
- 10. "Quietly, Entirely" (feat. Sea Oleena)
- 11. "Song About the Family House"
- 12. "The Ordinary is Ordinary Because It Ordinarily Repeats"

=== Daniel Caesar – NEVER ENOUGH ===
- 01. "Ocho Rios"
- 15. "Unstoppable"* (songwriting credit only)
- 16. "Please Do Not Lean" (feat. BADBADNOTGOOD)*

=== Turnstile & BadBadNotGood – New Heart Designs ===
- 01. "Mystery"
- 02. "Alien Love Call" (feat. Blood Orange)
- 03. "Underwater Boi"

=== BadBadNotGood & Charlotte Day Wilson – "Sleeper" single ===
- 01. "Sleeper"*

=== Elmiene & BadBadNotGood ===
- 01. "Marking My Time (BADBADNOTGOOD EDIT")*

== Uncertified work ==
Selected works

- Mac Miller & BBNG – Your Shoelaces are Untied (unreleased collaborative EP) (2013)
- Yasiin Bey – "Arcade" (unreleased track) (2016)
- XXXTentacion – "IGotPlentyDickToShare (Snippet)" single (2016)=== samples "Kaleidoscope" from III
- Smokepurpp – "By My Lonely" single (2016)=== samples "Kaleidoscope" from III
- Dave East – "It is Written" from Kairi Chanel (2016) (produced by Mr. Authentic)=== samples "Seasons (Waiting on You) [BBNG Reinterpretation]"
- Wonk – "Introduction#2" from Sphere (2016) (samples "Hedron" from III)
- Hus Kingpin – "Serotonin High" (featuring Milano Constantine and DJ Q-Bert ) single (2017)=== samples "Speaking Gently" from IV
- Kaytranada –"BBNG" (among 'more than 20' unreleased collaborative tracks) (2017)=== produced with Kaytranada
- Rick Ross – "Pinned to the Cross" (featuring Finn Matthews) single (2020) (produced by Fuse)=== samples "Seasons (Waiting on You) [BBNG Reinterpretation]"

== Notes ==
^{^[a]} BBNG served as a producer and the backing band on the 2016 record Toon Time Raw! by American musician Jerry Paper. They played under the pseudonym Easy Feelings Unlimited, and, aptly, are individually credited under pseudonyms as well=== Whitty as "Chomps Louise," Sowinski as "Albert Sow, Jr.," Hansen as "Chuck Hands," and Tavares as "Baba Marty."
