= Dimitrius Graham =

American singer-songwriter

- Born: Dimitrius Graham; 1991 (age 34–35); New York City, United States
- Occupations: Singer; songwriter
- Years active: 2017–present
- Television: The Voice, American Idol,

Dimitrius Graham (born 1991 (age 34–35)) is an American singer and songwriter. He has appeared as a high-placing contestant on vocal competition reality shows The Voice and American Idol. Graham is openly LGBTQ+.

== Early life and family ==
Dimitrius Graham was born in New York City but grew up in Baltimore, Maryland. Graham grew up in a single-parent household with five siblings. He learned to sing gospel in his local church. Graham received a Bachelor's degree in Music Performance from Morgan State University in Baltimore.

== Career ==
=== American Idol ===
Graham appeared on season 17 of the ABC Television Network series American Idol. Graham's audition was not shown on air. He performed "Wind Beneath My Wings" by Bette Midler and a group performance of "I Want It That Way" by the Backstreet Boys during Hollywood Week. Graham had to miss being present for his mother's heart surgery to be at Hollywood Week. Graham made it to the top 10, where he was eliminated during Disney Week after singing "You'll Be in My Heart" by Phil Collins from the movie Tarzan. He was part of a top 10 group performance of "Part of Your World" from the Little Mermaid with Lea Michele. During the season finale Graham did a duet of Queen's "Bohemian Rahpsody" with current Queen frontman and American Idol alumni Adam Lambert.

=== The Voice ===
Graham appeared on Season 27 of the NBC series The Voice. Graham first appeared in episode 4 of the blind auditions singing the song "Get You" by Canadian singer and songwriter Daniel Caesar. Graham ended up being selected by both Michael Bublé and Kelsea Ballerini, ultimately choosing to be a part of Bublé's team. He was later eliminated during a battle with fellow contestant Divighn to the song ""Leave the Door Open" by Silk Sonic.

== Discography ==
=== EPs ===
- Spill My Guts (2025)
- Spill My Guts Acoustic (2025)

=== Singles ===
- Souvenir (2019)
- Gone (2020)
- F$%^&* Up Acoustic (2023)
- Yours (2024)
- Something Bout Love (2024)
- Codine (2025)
- Always (2025)
- Order My Steps (2025)
- Fine (2026)

== Filmography ==
=== Television ===
Year	Title	Role	Notes
2019	American Idol	Himself (contestant)	Season 17, 10th place
2025	The Voice	Himself (contestant)	Season 27, Battles
2025	Kai Cenat’s Mafiathon 3	Himself	Live Stream
