= Get You =

Get You may refer to:

- "Get You" (Alexey Vorobyov song)
- "Get You" (Daniel Caesar song), featuring Kali Uchis
- "Get You", Shawn Austin song from the 2022 extended play Planes Don't Wait
