= Matthew Burnett =

Canadian record producer (born 1991)

- Burnett in 2019

Background information
- Born: Matthew Raymond Burnett; July 24, 1991 (age 35); Toronto, Ontario, Canada
- Genres: R&B; soul; hip hop
- Occupations: Record producer; musical director; talent manager
- Instruments: Piano; drums; bass guitar
- Years active: 2010–present
- Labels: Golden Child; Hit-Heart Music Inc.
- Website: producermatthewburnett.com

Matthew Raymond Burnett (born July 24, 1991) is a Canadian record producer, musical director and talent manager from Toronto, Ontario. Burnett has produced for artists including Drake, Eminem, Nas, Lil Wayne, Nicki Minaj, Chris Brown, Childish Gambino, Ellie Goulding and Snoh Aalegra. Alongside fellow producer Jordan Evans, Burnett has been a talent manager for Daniel Caesar, as well as a musical director for Tyla, Kelly Rowland, Jessie Reyez, Willow Smith and Queen Naija. Burnett's work has yielded him nominations for Grammy Awards and five Juno Award nominations. In 2018, he won a Juno Award for R&B/Soul Recording of the Year for Caesar's album Freudian.

== Biography ==
Starting piano lessons at four years old, Burnett's music instructor noted his natural talent to play songs by ear. By the time he was in ninth grade he was playing in a band around the city. Music production software FL Studio (formerly FruityLoops) would introduce him to the art of producing and recording his own music. Burnett earned a Bachelor of Music degree from the Humber Institute of Technology and Advanced Learning in Toronto, Ontario, Canada.

In 2007, Burnett was introduced to Grammy Award-winning producer Matthew Samuels, known commonly as Boi-1da, and began a mentorship. Burnett signed to Boi-1da Productions in 2010. Notable among Burnett's earliest achievements was his production on "Not Afraid," the lead single on rapper Eminem's seventh studio album, Recovery, and the sixteenth song in Billboard history to debut at number one. The track earned Burnett a Grammy Award-nomination for "Best Rap Song" in 2011.

Ending his Boi-1da deal in 2013, Burnett and partner Evans moved on to manage Canadian R&B artist, Daniel Caesar. The two are the principal producers for Caesar's debut album, Freudian, which was nominated for two awards at the 60th Annual Grammys.

== Artistry ==
=== Record production ===
Burnett has co-produced music for other artists, including Drake, Eminem, Keri Hilson, Nas, Lil Wayne and DJ Khaled. Recently, he has produced for Daniel Caesar, Chris Brown, Nicki Minaj, Childish Gambino, Kelly Rowland, Jessie Reyez and Ellie Goulding. His sound and production style were heavily influenced by his Christian upbringing, taking inspiration from gospel music.

=== Musical direction ===
A producer at heart, Burnett's wheelhouse soon expanded to include not only studio production, but live show curation and musical direction. He served as the visionary behind live performances for singers Daniel Caesar, Tyla, Jessie Reyez, Willow Smith, Kelly Rowland, and Queen Naija among others.

=== Management ===
Burnett serves alongside longtime music partner Jordan Evans as the co-manager to Grammy Award-winning artist, Daniel Caesar. In partnership with Evans and Caesar, Burnett founded the independent record label Golden Child Recordings.

== Production Discography ==
=== 2010 ===
Drake – Thank Me Later

- 06. "Up All Night" (featuring Nicki Minaj) (produced with Boi-1da)

Eminem – Recovery

- 07. "Not Afraid" (produced with Boi-1da, Jordan Evans and Eminem)
- 08. "Seduction" (produced with Boi-1da)

Bun B – Trill OG

- 16. "It's Been a Pleasure" (featuring Drake) (produced with Boi-1da and Jordan Evans)

Lil' Wayne – I Am Not a Human Being

- 10. "Bill Gates" (produced with Boi-1da)

Drake – Unreleased single

- "Something" (produced with Boi-1da and Jordan Evans)

Lloyd Banks – The Hunger For More 2

- 15. "Where I'm At" (featuring Eminem) (produced with Boi-1da)

Keri Hilson – No Boys Allowed

- 01. "Buyou Music" (featuring J. Cole) (produced with Boi-1da, Polow da Don and Bei Maejor)
- 10. "Gimmie What I Want" (produced with Boi-1da)
- 16. "Fearless" (produced with Boi-1da, Polow da Don and Bei Maejor)

=== 2011 ===
DJ Khaled – We The Best Forever

- 08. "Can't Stop" (featuring Birdman and T–Pain) (produced with Boi-1da)

Mindless Behavior – #1 Girl

- 08. "Future" (produced with Boi-1da)

Down With Webster – Time to Win, Vol. 2

- 07. "I Want It All" (produced with Boi-1da)

=== 2012 ===
Childish Gambino – Royalty

- 16. "Wonderful" (featuring John Osho) (produced with Boi-1da and Jordan Evans)

Nas – Life Is Good

- 19. "Trust" (produced with Boi-1da and Jordan Evans)

Busta Rhymes – Year of the Dragon

- 09. "Sound Boy" (featuring Cam'ron) (produced with Boi-1da)

2 Chainz – Based on a T.R.U Story

- 01. "Yuck" (featuring Lil Wayne) (produced with Streetrunner)

Slaughterhouse – Welcome to Our House

- 13. "Goodbye" (produced with Boi-1da and Eminem)

Talib Kweli – Attack The Block

- 06. Outstanding (featuring Ryan Leslie) (produced with Boi-1da)

Nicki Minaj – Pink Friday: Roman Reloaded – The Re–Up

- 02. "Freedom" (produced with Boi-1da)

Game – Jesus Piece

- 09. "See No Evil" (featuring Kendrick Lamar and Tank) (produced with Boi-1da)

Tyga – Careless World: Rise of the Last King

- 06. "I'm Gone" (featuring Big Sean) (co-produced with Boi-1da & Jordan Evans)

DJ Khaled – Kiss the Ring

- 11. "Suicidal Thoughts" (featuring Movado) (co-produced with Boi-1da)

Kirko Bangz – Procrastination Kills 4

- 2. "Hold It Down" (featuring Young Jeezy) (co-produced with Boi-1da)

Meek Mill – Dreams and Nightmares

- 4. "Traumatized" (co-produced with Boi-1da)
- 10. "Tony Story, Pt. 2" (co-produced with Boi-1da)

=== 2013 ===
Kelly Rowland – Talk a Good Game

- 09. "Red Wine" (produced with Boi-1da and Kevin Cossom)

Rich Gang – Rich Gang

- 01. "R.G." (featuring Mystikal) (produced with Boi-1da and Jordan Evans)

Lil Wayne – Dedication 5

- 12. "Live Life" (featuring Euro) (produced with Streetrunner)

Audio Push – Come as You Are

- 09. "Turn Down" (produced with DZL)

Drake – Nothing Was the Same

- 13. "Pound Cake" (produced with Boi-1da and Jordan Evans)

Doley Bernays – Just In Case

- 06. "Drown" (produced with Jordan Evans and DZL)

Fabolous – The Soul Tape 3

- 07. "You Know" (featuring Young Jeezy) (produced with Boi-1da and Vinylz)

Lecrae – Church Clothes 2

- 08. "Lost My Way" (featuring Mez & Daniel Daley) (co-produced with Boi-1da and DZL)

=== 2014 ===
Eric Bellinger – The Rebirth

- 06. "Delorean" (produced with T-Minus)

Zuse – Bullet

- 11. "Oiler" (featuring Trae The Truth) (produced with Go Grizzly and DZL)

Sebastian Mikael – Speechless

- 04. "Made For Me" (featuring Teyana Taylor) (produced with DZL)

G–Eazy – These Things Happen

- 05. "Opportunity Cost" (produced with Jordan Evans)

Game – Blood Moon: Year of the Wolf

- 02. "F.U.N."
- 06. "Married To The Game" (featuring French Montana, Dubb and Sam Hook) (produced with Boi-1da and Jordan Evans)

Astro – Computer Era

- 10. "N*gga Pls" (produced with [Boi-1da])

Jahkoy – Forward Thinking

- 08. "Vacay" (produced with Jordan Evans)

OB O'Brien – "Schemin' Up" Single

- "Schemin' Up" (produced with Boi-1da and 40)

Daniel Caesar – Praise Break (Executive Produced with Jordan Evans)

- 01. "End of the Road"
- 02. "Violet"
- 03. "Chevalier"
- 04. "Casablanca"
- 05. "We'll Always Have Paris" (featuring Sean Leon)
- 06. "Pseudo"
- 07. "Porn Star"

=== 2015 ===
Kyndall – Still Down EP

- 02. "All Mine" (produced with Boi-1da and DZL)

Raekwon – Fly International Luxurious Art

- 13. "Worst Enemy" (featuring Liz Rodrigues) (produced with DZL)

Daniel Caesar – Pilgrim's Paradise

- 02. "Death and Taxes" (produced with Jordan Evans)
- 03. "Paradise" (produced with BadBadNotGood and Jordan Evans)
- 05. "Streetcar" (produced with Jordan Evans)
- 06. "Show No Regret" (produced with Jordan Evans)

KYLE – Smyle

- 10. "Remember Me?" (featuring Chance The Rapper) (produced with Jordan Evans)

Chris Brown – Royalty

- 06. "Zero" (produced with Tushar Apte and Riley Bell)

Various artists – Magic Mike XXL Original Motion Picture Soundtrack

- 08. "Untitled (How Does It Feel)"

=== 2016 ===
June's Diary – "All of Us" Single

- "All of Us" (produced with DZL)

Audio Push – 90951

- 04. "Spread Love" (produced with DZL)

Daniel Caesar – Get You – Single

- '"Won't Live Here" (produced with Jordan Evans)
- "Get You" (produced with Jordan Evans)
- "Japanese Denim" (produced with Jordan Evans)

Nathan Sykes – Unfinished Business

- 09. "Give It Up" (featuring G–Eazy) (produced with Riley Bell)

Ellie Goulding – Single

- "Just in Case" (produced with Jordan Evans)

PartyNextDoor – TBD

- "You Made It" (produced with Jordan Evans)

11:11 - 11:11 (Executive producer with DZL)

- 01. "West Side"
- 02. "You"
- 03. "Byo"
- 04. "I'm Good"
- 05. "My Bish"
- 06. "Henny & Gin"
- 07. "Don't Worry"

=== 2017 ===
Joyner Lucas – 508-507-2209

- 09. "Way To Go" (featuring Snoh Aalegra) (produced with Riley Bell)

Chris Brown – Heartbreak on a Full Moon

- 41. "Reddi Whip" (produced with Jordan Evans)

Daniel Caesar – Freudian (Executive produced with Jordan Evans)

- 01. "Get You" (feat. Kali Uchis)
- 02. "Best Part" (feat. H.E.R)
- 03. "Hold Me Down" (produced with Alex Ernewein and Riley Bell)
- 04. "Neu Roses (Transgressor's Song)"
- 05. "Loose" (produced with Alex Ernewein)
- 06. "We Find Love" (produced with Jordon Manswell)
- 07. "Blessed"
- 08. "Take Me Away" (feat. Syd) (produced with Riley Bell)
- 09. "Transform" (feat. Charlotte Day Wilson) (produced with Alex Ernewein and Riley Bell)
- 10. "Freudian" (produced with and Riley Bell)

=== 2018 ===
Jessie Reyez feat. Daniel Caesar – Single

- "Figures, a Reprise" (produced with Jordan Evans)

Daniel Caesar – Single

- "Who Hurt You?" (co-produced with Jordan Evans)

=== 2019 ===
Snoh Aalegra – Ugh, Those Feels Again

- 06. "Toronto" (produced with Riley Bell)

Daniel Caesar – Case Study 01 (Executive producer with Jordan Evans and Daniel Caesar)

- 02. "Cyanide" (produced with Jordan Evans)
- 03. "Love Again" (feat. Brandy) (produced with Jordan Evans)
- 05. "Open Up" (produced with Jordan Evans)
- 06. "Restore the Feeling" (feat. Sean Leon and Jacob Collier) (produced with Jordan Evans)
- 08. "Too Deep to Turn Back" (produced with Jordan Evans and River Tiber)

=== 2020 ===
Fousheé – Single

- "Single AF" (produced with Solomonophonic)

=== 2021 ===
Dylan Sinclair - Single

- "Black Creek Drive" (produced with Jordan Evans and Zachary Simmonds)

=== 2022 ===
Daniel Caesar - Single

- "Please Do Not Lean" (produced with Jordan Evans and BADBADNOTGOOD)

Givēon - Give or Take

- "dec 11th" (produced with Jordan Evans)

=== 2023 ===
Daniel Caesar – NEVER ENOUGH

- "Ocho Rios" (produced with Daniel Caesar,Jordan Evans, Sir Dylan and BADBADNOTGOOD)
- "Cool" (produced with Daniel Caesar, Jordan Evans and Sacha Rudy)
- "Homiesexual (feat. Ty Dolla $ign)" (produced with Daniel Caesar, Jordan Evans, Sir Dylan and Zachary Simmonds)
- "Superpowers" (produced with Daniel Caesar, Jordan Evans and Sir Dylan)

=== 2024 ===
Charlotte Day Wilson - Cyan Blue

- "Dovetail" (produced with Jordan Evans, Charlotte Day Wilson, Jack Rochon)

Jessie Reyez - Single

- "Merry Nothin" (produced with Jessie Reyez)

=== 2025 ===
Givēon - Beloved

- "Mud" (produced with Peter Lee Johnson, Aaron Paris, and Sevn Thomas)
- "Rather Be" (produced with Sevn Thomas, Jahaan Sweet, Maneesh, and Jeff Gitelman)
- "Twenties" (produced with Sevn Thomas, Jahaan Sweet, Maneesh, and Jeff Gitelman)
- "Strangers" (produced with Sevn Thomas, Jahaan Sweet, David Phelps, NinetyFour, and Beat Butcha)
- "Numb" (produced with Sevn Thomas, Jahaan Sweet, Peter Lee Johnson, and Jeff Gitelman)
- "I Can Tell" (produced with Sevn Thomas, Jahaan Sweet, Kemy Siala, Los Hendrix, and Jeff Gitelman)
- "Keeper" (produced with Sevn Thomas, Jahaan Sweet, and Jeff Gitelman)
- "Backup Plan" (produced with Sevn Thomas, Maneesh, and Jeff Gitelman)
- "Don't Leave" (produced with Peter Lee Johnson, and Sevn Thomas)
- "Avalanche" (produced with Sevn Thomas, Maneesh, and Jeff Gitelman)

Jessie Reyez - Single

- "Culdn't Be Me (Piano Acoustic Version)"
- "Culdn't Be Me (Live Version)" (produced with Jonathan Gateretse)

Daniel Caesar - Son of Spergy (Executive produced with Jordan Evans and Mustafa)

- "Call On Me" (produced with Jordan Evans, Daniel Caesar, and Rami Dawod)
- "Who Knows" (produced with Daniel Caesar)
- "Sins Of The Father" (featuring Bon Iver)

=== 2026 ===
Givēon - Beloved: Act II

- "Jezebel" (produced with Jahaan Sweet, Sevn Thomas, Kemy Siala, Peter Lee Johnson, Loshendrix and Jeff Gitelman)
- "Save Some For Me" (featuring Kehlani) (produced with Sevn Thomas, Ninetyfour and Jeff Gitelman)
- "Fool Me Once" (featuring Leon Thomas) (produced with Leon Thomas, Sevn Thomas and Loshendrix)
- "Replica" (featuring Sasha Keable) (produced with Brian Cruz, Rowan, Sevn Thomas) and Jeff Gitelman
- "Keeper" (Teddy Swims) (produced with Jahaan Sweet, Sevn Thomas, and Jeff Gitelman)

== Tours (musical direction) ==
Year	Tour	Artist
2017-18	Freudian, a World Tour	Daniel Caesar
2018	Queen Naija Tour	Queen Naija
2019	Case Study 01: Tour	Daniel Caesar
2019	Being Human in Public Tour	Jessie Reyez
2019	WILLOW The Album Live in Concert	Willow Smith
2019	Willow and Erys Tour	Willow and Jaden Smith
2022	ALPHA	Charlotte Day Wilson
2023	The Jaguar Tour	Victoria Monét
2023-24	Yessie Tour	Jessie Reyez
2025	Paid In Memories Tour	Jessie Reyez
2025	Summer Festival Tour	Tyla

== TV and live performances (musical direction) ==
Year	Performance	Artist	Link
2017	"Get You" & "We Find Love" - The Late Late Show With James Corden	Daniel Caesar	
2018	"Freudian" & "We Find Love" - Juno Awards Live	Daniel Caesar	https://www.youtube.com/watch?v=VZrI5avizIw
2018	"Best Part" - Later with Jools Holland	Daniel Caesar (Feat. H.E.R)	https://www.youtube.com/watch?v=j045yEf2cLg
2018	"Figures, a Reprise" - Juno Awards	Jessie Reyez (Feat. Daniel Caesar)	https://www.youtube.com/watch?v=4f6qLbg_paU
2018	"Japanese Denim" "Get You" & "Best Part - NPR Music Tiny Desk Concert	Daniel Caesar (Feat. H.E.R.)	https://www.youtube.com/watch?v=PBKa-AAy_vo
2019	"Bad Boy/Medicine" - BET Experience	Queen Naija	https://www.youtube.com/watch?v=tOsoExR2tlA
2019	"Cyanide" - Jimmy Kimmel Live	Daniel Caesar	https://www.youtube.com/watch?v=alW0Y9ciBvk
2019	"Crazy/Far Away" - Jimmy Kimmel Live	Jessie Reyez	https://www.youtube.com/watch?v=2LSLSOnwyvQ
2019	"Imported" - Late Show with Stephen Colbert	Jessie Reyez (Feat. 6LACK)	https://www.youtube.com/watch?v=JKW5jg–hz-0
2019	"Work" - The Late Late Show with James Corden	Charlotte Day Wilson	https://www.youtube.com/watch?v=nd8tKmJ8GdM
2020	"Far Away" - The Daily Show	Jessie Reyez	
2020	"Moment" - Jimmy Kimmel Live	Victoria Monét	https://www.youtube.com/watch?v=LCU53ZW8GKw
2020	"Slow Down" - Soul Train Awards	Skip Marley	https://www.youtube.com/watch?v=xiTI6aJ8P8w
2020	"Lie to Me/Say What You Mean" - Jimmy Kimmel Live	Queen Naija (Feat. Lil Durk)	https://www.youtube.com/watch?v=W39QY_jE59w
2021	"Do You Love Her" - Juno Awards	Jessie Reyez	https://www.youtube.com/watch?v=N5P9QjO0qgw
2021	"Canadian Hip Hop Tribute" - Juno Awards	Kardinal Offishall, Michie Mee, Jully Black, DJ Starting from Scratch, Maestro Fresh Wes, NAV, Haviah Mighty	https://www.youtube.com/watch?v=82uGx4qgmRE
2022	"Mountains" - The Ellen DeGeneres Show	Charlotte Day Wilson	https://www.youtube.com/watch?v=cajlcFX9DU8
2022	"How Does It Make You Feel" - (Live Performance) Vevo	Victoria Monét	https://www.youtube.com/watch?v=-AMZYZPSdtI
2022	"Mood" (Pt. 1) "Mutual Friend" / "Figures" "Only One" "Forever" / "Imported" "Mood" (Pt. 2)" - NPR Music Tiny Desk Concert	Jessie Reyez	https://www.youtube.com/watch?v=wSl5_RDCfrQ
2023	"Mutual Friend" - Juno Awards	Jessie Reyez	https://www.youtube.com/watch?v=JJj8vWbTSeE
2023	"Still C U" - The Tonight Show Starring Jimmy Fallon	Jessie Reyez	https://www.youtube.com/watch?v=x0SGbl6wCo8
2023	"Always" - The Late Show with Stephen Colbert	Daniel Caesar	https://www.youtube.com/watch?v=_AyYn2g1ndY
2023	"On My Mama" - The Tonight Show Starring Jimmy Fallon	Victoria Monét	https://www.youtube.com/watch?v=GvFYSMU3VeQ
2024	"Jump" - BET Awards 2024	Tyla	https://www.youtube.com/watch?v=5cKfE5N13fs
2024	"PUSH 2 START" & "Water" - Victoria's Secret Fashion Show 2024	Tyla	https://www.youtube.com/watch?v=A8n9wf0R1xo

== Awards and nominations ==
=== Grammy Awards ===
Year	Nominated work	Award	Result
2011	"Not Afraid" (Eminem)	Best Rap Song	Nominated
2017	"Freudian" (Daniel Caesar)	Best R&B Album	Nominated

=== Juno Awards ===
Year	Nominated work	Award	Result
2011	"Recovery" (Eminem)	Best International Album	Nominated
2018	Producer of the Year (Matthew Burnett, Jordan Evans)	Jack Richardson Producer of the Year	Nominated
2018	"Freudian" (Daniel Caesar)	R&B/Soul Recording of the Year	Won
2020	"Case Study 01" (Daniel Caesar)	R&B/Soul Recording of the Year	Nominated

=== Canadian Film Screen Awards ===
Year	Nominated work	Award	Result
2021	"Juno Awards of 2021"	Best Live Entertainment Special	Won
