= Best Part (song) =

Single by Daniel Caesar and H.E.R.

from the album Freudian and H.E.R.
- Released: August 25 2017
- Genre: Acoustic; indie pop; R&B
- Length: 3:29
- Label: Golden Child; RCA
- Songwriters: Daniel Caesar; Gabi Wilson Teddy Genius
- Producers: Jordan Evans; Matthew Burnett

Daniel Caesar singles chronology
"Blessed" (2017)	"Best Part" (2017)	"Figures, a Reprise" (2018)

H.E.R. singles chronology
"Focus" (2016)	"Best Part" (2017)	"This Way" (2018)

Music video
- "Best Part" on YouTube

"Best Part" is a song by Canadian singer Daniel Caesar and American singer H.E.R., released in 2017 as a part of Caesar's album Freudian. It is also included in H.E.R.'s self-titled album, released in 2017.

== Accolades ==
"Best Part" won Best Collaboration at the 2018 Soul Train Music Awards while also being nominated for The Ashford & Simpson Songwriter's Awards.

The song also won the Grammy Award for Best R&B Performance at the 61st Annual Grammy Awards.

== Charts ==
"Best Part" is both artists' second single sent to the Adult R&B Songs (Billboard) to become number one, something achieved by only four other artists before them.

=== Weekly charts ===
Chart (2017–2024)	Peak position
Philippines Hot 100 (Billboard)	21
Portugal (AFP)	184
US Billboard Hot 100	75
US Hot R&B/Hip-Hop Songs (Billboard)	32
US Adult R&B Songs (Billboard)	1

=== Year-end charts ===
Chart (2018)	Position
US Hot R&B/Hip-Hop Songs (Billboard)	91

Chart (2024)	Position
Philippines (Philippines Hot 100)	41

Chart (2025)	Position
Philippines (Philippines Hot 100)	68

== Certifications ==
Region	Certification	Certified units/sales
Brazil (Pro-Música Brasil)	Platinum	40,000^{‡}
Canada (Music Canada)	4× Platinum	320,000^{‡}
Denmark (IFPI Danmark)	Platinum	90,000^{‡}
France (SNEP)	Platinum	200,000^{‡}
New Zealand (RMNZ)	6× Platinum	180,000^{‡}
Portugal (AFP)	Platinum	10,000^{‡}
United Kingdom (BPI)	Platinum	600,000^{‡}
United States (RIAA)	7× Platinum	7,000,000^{‡}
^{‡} Sales+streaming figures based on certification alone.
