= Freudian (album) =

Studio album by Daniel Caesar
- Released: August 25, 2017
- Genres: R&B; neo soul; gospel
- Length: 44:47
- Label: Golden Child
- Producers: Jordan Evans (also exec.); Matthew Burnett (also exec.); Alex Ernewein; BadBadNotGood; Daniel Caesar; Jordon Manswell; Riley Bell

Daniel Caesar chronology
Pilgrim's Paradise (2015)	Freudian (2017)	Case Study 01 (2019)

Singles from Freudian
- 1. "Get You" Released: October 20, 2016; 2. "We Find Love" / "Blessed" Released: June 9, 2017; 3. "Best Part" Released: August 25, 2017

Freudian is the debut studio album by Canadian singer and songwriter Daniel Caesar. It was released independently on August 25, 2017, by Golden Child Recordings, with distribution from TuneCore. It includes guest appearances from Kali Uchis, H.E.R., Syd, Charlotte Day Wilson and Sean Leon. Production derives from Caesar, Matthew Burnett, Jordan Evans, BadBadNotGood, Alex Ernewein, Riley Bell and Jordon Manswell. The album succeeds the 2015 EP Pilgrim's Paradise. The album was nominated for a Grammy in the Best R&B Album Category, alongside a nomination for Best R&B Performance with "Get You" at the 60th Annual Grammy Awards, with "Best Part" with H.E.R. winning Best R&B Performance at the 61st Annual Grammy Awards.

The album was supported by the singles "Get You" featuring Kali Uchis and the double single "We Find Love" / "Blessed".

== Singles ==
The lead single "Get You" featuring Kali Uchis was released on October 20, 2016, for streaming and digital download. The second single, "We Find Love" / "Blessed" was released on June 9, 2017.

== Artwork ==
The album artwork features photography by creative directors Keavan Yazdani and Sean Brown. The photograph is Caesar climbing an incline on the Monument to 1300 Years of Bulgaria, Shumen.

== Critical reception ==
Professional ratings
Review scores
Source	Rating
AllMusic	3.5/5 stars
Exclaim!	9/10
Now	4/5
Pitchfork	7.3/10
Cult MTL	9/10

Freudian received widespread acclaim from critics upon release. In a positive review, Briana Younger of Pitchfork complimented the gospel elements of the album, stating: "There’s much here that blends well into this 1990s-obsessed era, but Caesar’s gospel background is his not-so-secret weapon. While he’s surely not the only contemporary R&B singer who grew up in the church, he doesn’t shy away from bringing the full range of his influences to his music. Caesar’s willingness to use all of the tools at his disposal—to explore his own id and superego right alongside love’s heaven and hell—elevates his craft."

Kevin Ritchie of Now commented that Freudian is "not an album of sweeping gestures, but rather an ambling, pleasant account of a 20-something falling in and out of love. It’s full of small moments, nuance and detail." Ryan Patrick of Exclaim! praised the production and originality: "Freudian isn't about whatever's passing for the genre on streaming playlists, radio or video; it isn't even a throwback. It's a carefully created album rooted in classic gospel and R&B, and a revelation in a world of sludgy alt-R&B, an outlier among overtly soulless genre takes hailed as the next thing because no one knows any better."

Exclaim! ranked the album at number 5 on their "Top 10 Soul and R&B Albums of 2017".

The album was a shortlisted finalist for the 2018 Polaris Music Prize.

== Commercial performance ==
Freudian debuted at number 25 on the Billboard 200. On September 1, 2017, Freudian entered the UK R&B Chart at number 15, while entering the UK Independent Chart at number 40.

== Track listing ==
Freudian
No.	Title	Writer(s)	Producer(s)	Length
1.	"Get You" (featuring Kali Uchis)	Ashton Simmonds; Karly Loaiza; Jordan Evans; Matthew Burnett; Ian Culley; Wesley Allen; Alexander Sowinski; Chester Hansen; Leland Whitty; Matthew Tavares	Matthew Burnett; Jordan Evans; BadBadNotGood^{[a]}	4:38
2.	"Best Part" (featuring H.E.R.)	Simmonds; Gabi Wilson; Burnett; Evans; Riley Bell	Burnett; Evans	3:29
3.	"Hold Me Down"	Simmonds; Burnett; Evans; Alex Ernewein; Nevon Sinclair; Kirk Franklin	Burnett; Evans; Alex Ernewein^{[a]}; Riley Bell^{[a]}	3:51
4.	"Neu Roses (Transgressor's Song)"	Simmonds; Burnett; Evans; Sinclair; Sean Barrow	Burnett; Evans	3:01
5.	"Loose"	Simmonds; Ernewein; Burnett; Evans	Ernewein; Burnett^{[a]}; Evans^{[a]}	3:05
6.	"We Find Love"	Simmonds; Evans; Burnett; Jordon Manswell; Allen; Sinclair; Kyle David Matthews	Burnett; Evans; Jordon Manswell^{[b]}	4:14
7.	"Blessed"	Simmonds; Burnett; Evans; Culley; Ernewein; Sinclair	Burnett; Evans	4:01
8.	"Take Me Away" (featuring Syd)	Simmonds; Sydney Bennett; Evans; Burnett; Culley	Burnett; Evans; Bell^{[a]}	3:46
9.	"Transform" (featuring Charlotte Day Wilson)	Simmonds; Charlotte Wilson; Burnett; Evans; Ernewein	Burnett; Evans; Bell^{[a]}; Ernewein^{[b]}	4:40
10.	"Freudian"	Simmonds; Matthew Sean Leon; Burnett; Evans; Sinclair; Bell	Burnett; Evans; Bell^{[a]}	10:02
Total length:				44:47

Notes

- ^{^[a]} signifies an additional producer.
- ^{^[b]} signifies a co-producer.
- "Hold Me Down" features additional vocals by Cadaro Tribe.
- "Neu Roses (Transgressor's Song)" and "Loose" feature additional vocals by Nevon Sinclair.
- "Freudian" features additional vocals by Sean Leon.
- “Freudian” is shortened on the vinyl release, for a length of 5:03.

Sample credits

- "Hold Me Down" contains an interpolation of "Hold Me Now", written and performed by Kirk Franklin.
- "We Find Love" contains an interpolation of "We Fall Down", written by Kyle David Matthews and performed by Donnie McClurkin.

== Personnel ==
Credits adapted from the liner notes of Freudian and Daniel Caesar's Instagram.

Artists

- Daniel Caesar
- Charlotte Day Wilson – featured artist (also engineer)
- H.E.R. – featured artist
- Kali Uchis – featured artist
- Syd – featured artist (also engineer)

Production

- Matthew Burnett – producer, executive producer, A&R, management
- Jordan Evans – producer, executive producer, A&R, management, engineer
- Alex Ernewein – producer
- Jordon Manswell – producer
- Riley Bell – producer, engineer

Other musicians

- BadBadNotGood – additional music (credited for additional production)
- C.J. Mairs – additional music
- Cadaro Tribe – additional vocals
- Ian Culley – additional music
- Nevon Sinclair – additional vocals
- Sean Barrow – additional music
- Sean Leon – additional vocals
- Steve Henry – additional music
- Wesley Allen – additional music

Other technical

- Calvin Hartwick – engineer
- Eric Stenman – engineer
- Ethan “SPYDER” Ashby – engineer
- Jeremy Nichols – engineer

Other management

- Angelika Heim – legal
- Anthony Osei – publicity
- John Ingram – legal

Design

- Eric Lachance – packaging design
- Keavan Yazdani – artwork
- Sean Brown – artwork

== Charts ==
=== Weekly charts ===
Chart (2017)	Peak position
Belgian Albums (Ultratop Flanders)	192
Canadian Albums (Billboard)	16
New Zealand Albums (RMNZ)	39
UK Independent Albums (Official Charts)	40
UK R&B Albums (Official Charts)	15
US Billboard 200	25
US Top R&B/Hip-Hop Albums (Billboard)	16

Chart (2025–2026)	Peak position
Portuguese Albums (AFP)	100

=== Year-end charts ===
Chart (2018)	Position
US Billboard 200	110
Chart (2019)	Position
US Billboard 200	196
Chart (2025)	Position
US Billboard 200	134
US Top R&B/Hip-Hop Albums (Billboard)	59

== Certifications ==
Region	Certification	Certified units/sales
Canada (Music Canada)	2× Platinum	160,000^{‡}
Denmark (IFPI Danmark)	Platinum	20,000^{‡}
New Zealand (RMNZ)	3× Platinum	45,000^{‡}
United States (RIAA)	Platinum	1,000,000^{‡}
^{‡} Sales+streaming figures based on certification alone.
