= Not Afraid =

2010 single by Eminem

Single by Eminem

from the album Recovery
- Released: April 27, 2010
- Recorded: April 2010
- Studio: Effigy Studios (Ferndale, Michigan); Encore Studios (Burbank, California); Boi-1da Studios (Ajax, Ontario)
- Genre: Hip hop
- Length: 4:10
- Label: Aftermath; Shady; Interscope
- Songwriters: Marshall Mathers; Luis Resto; Matthew Samuels; Jordan Evans; Matthew Burnett
- Producers: Boi-1da; Jordan Evans (add.); Matthew Burnett (add.); Eminem (add.)

Eminem singles chronology
"Drop the World" (2010)	"Not Afraid" (2010)	"Love the Way You Lie" (2010)

Music video
- "Not Afraid" on YouTube

"Not Afraid" is a song by the American rapper Eminem from his seventh album Recovery (2010). It was released as the album's lead single on April 27, 2010, by Interscope Records. "Not Afraid" was first revealed as a single by Eminem via Twitter, after which the song debuted on radio. To promote the single's release, a freestyle rap, "Despicable", was released on the Internet and received attention for its tone and lyrical content. "Not Afraid" was written and produced by Eminem, Boi-1da, Jordan Evans, and Matthew Burnett; keyboardist Luis Resto was also attributed with songwriting credit. According to Eminem's manager Paul Rosenberg and music critics, "Not Afraid" carries a positive message and depicts Eminem's change in direction from drugs and violence. The hip hop song features a choir that assists Eminem in a heavily layered chorus and vocals are sung over a guitar, synthesizer, and piano; no Auto-Tune was used on the sung vocals, but many reverberation tools were.

"Not Afraid" received positive reviews from music critics, who praised the song for being anthemic in nature and carrying a positive message. The song did, however, face criticism for its sudden change in theme from previous singles, and was considered to be less affecting than some of his other songs. "Not Afraid" became the 16th song in Billboard history to debut on the Billboard Hot 100 at number one; it also debuted as a chart-topper in Canada. In June 2014, the song was certified 10× Platinum by RIAA, making Eminem the first artist with digital diamond awards for two songs. "Not Afraid" has earned Eminem MTV Video Music Awards, MTV Video Music Awards Japan, Grammy Awards, Billboard Music Awards, and Detroit Music Awards.

The song was accompanied by a music video, which Rich Lee directed in May 2010. New York City and Newark, New Jersey, were chosen as settings to shoot the video. Reviewers praised the video as it followed the lyrics and praised the video for such depictions. However, the product placement in the video by Nike shoes and Beats by Dr. Dre headphones was criticized. In 2010, Eminem performed "Not Afraid" at Electronic Entertainment Expo 2010 (E3 2010), Oxegen 2010, T in the Park 2010, and the 2010 MTV Video Music Awards. He has also performed the song at the Bonnaroo Music Festival, Lollapalooza, and the V Festival. Rolling Stone ranked it the 24th best song of 2010, making it Eminem's most successful single since "Lose Yourself", until it was surpassed by "Love the Way You Lie".

== Writing and recording ==
In 2009, Eminem planned to release Relapse 2, a sequel to his sixth studio album Relapse. However, he cancelled the project and released a completely different studio album titled Recovery. He said, "as I kept recording and working with new producers, the idea of a sequel to Relapse started to make less and less sense to me, and I wanted to make a completely new album." "Not Afraid" was primarily produced by the Canadian hip hop musician Boi-1da. According to Mike Strange, who recorded "Not Afraid", he wanted to work with Boi-1da after listening to his "Forever", which he had produced for the rapper Drake. Boi-1da sent Strange many tracks, to some of which Eminem wrote lyrics. These tracks were opened in Pro Tools, as Strange proceeded to record Eminem's vocals. Recording sessions took place at Effigy Studios, in Ferndale, Michigan, but Boi-1da was absent during the sessions of the track.

The original tracks sent to Strange included mostly drums and keyboard pads; they were placed under an inactive track titled "Orig beatz". The instrumentation included a Roland TR-808 kick, a regular live kick, a hi-hat, a ride cymbal and a snare drum. Underneath the track, there were horn, orchestra hit and pads, including a Mellotron sound that plays the chord progression. Strange told Sound on Sound magazine, "I like to have the vocal tracks at the top of the Session, because in hip-hop they are the most important element." Two of Eminem's were placed underneath his main vocal track, as one of them featured his introductory words. Each play of the chorus was an overdub and not copies of a sample; the only exception was the intro. The vocals for the bridge were overdubbed six times; Auto-Tune was not used at all in the song. The Detroit musician Luis Resto provided keyboard tracks on the bridge, including piano and guitar sound effects. Resto also added orchestration in the chorus and bridge of the song.

Strange arranged the Pro Tools session in a more traditional manner by laying out the drums, bass instruments, guitars, keyboards, main vocals and overdubs from left to right. While mixing, he began with drums, then the main vocals. He added the chorus and bridge, followed by other instrumentation. Strange mixed the track to satisfy Eminem, who, after entering the studio, made his own adjustments, providing additional production; by then, Resto's tracks were added. Strange made adjustments to Boi-1da's tracks, using SSL equalization (EQ) and some compression. To keep the track in tune from pitch fluctuation, Strange used Trim and Auto-Tune on Resto's TR-808 kick. Strange arranged reverberation tools, including the Bricasti, Eventide 2016, the Lexicon 480, Lexicon PMC70, and the Yamaha SPX90.

The two rap tracks in the session used the Massenburg EQ plug-in, "the '9' send goes to the eighth-note delay track immediately above the two rap tracks" and Digidesign Extra Long Delay. Strange also used compressors, including the Alta Moda Unicomp, which he felt works well on vocals, as well as the kick and snare drums. Boi-1da's track mostly used SSL and compression, but the bass used an API 550a. A Digidesign compressor limiter was set up on one of the horn sounds while the Massenburg EQ was used on an OB8 sound. Answering Eminem's request, string overdubs were arranged and recorded by Jordan Evans and Matthew Burnett—providing additional production—and Robert Reyes recorded the choir's vocals.

== Composition ==
"Not Afraid"
A sample of the song with the chorus, in which a choir assists Eminem

"Not Afraid" is a hip hop song written and produced by Rick Crowe, Eminem, Evans and Burnett; Resto did additional writing. Boi-1da provided drums; Evans and Burnett provided string sounds. The lyrics focus on a positive change from Eminem's past experiences, including an end to drug abuse, feuds and violence. The Los Angeles Times noted that a person hearing this song for the first time may identify it as Christian hip hop. MTV News writer Shaheem Reid noted that "There are no jabs at pop-culture icons, no jovial goofballing." Led by a guitar, synthesizer and piano, "Not Afraid" is published in the key of C minor and has a moderate tempo of 86 beats per minute, according to the sheet music published by Sony/ATV Music Publishing. A writer for MuchMusic website noted that Eminem chose to use his Marshall Mathers ego for the song, rather than Slim Shady. He follows a chord progression of Cm–A♭_{(maj7)}–E♭–B♭ in the chorus.

The song begins with a brief introduction in which Eminem says while the chorus plays underneath, "Yeh, it's been a ride. I guess I had to go to that place to get to this one." When he begins the first verse, his lyrics threaten people who have looked down on him: "You can try to read my lyrics off of this paper before I lay 'em/ But you won't take the sting out these words before I say 'em." On the second verse, Eminem says that he has indeed made mistakes, commenting on his Relapse album: "That last Relapse CD was ehh/ Perhaps I ran them accents into the ground/ Relax, I ain't going to do that now." When he says "All I'm trying to say is get back, click clack, pow", a gunshot is heard. Approaching the end of the second verse, Eminem raps about his personal experiences: "But I think I'm still trying to figure this crap out/ Thought I had it mapped out, but I guess I didn't/ It's time to exercise these demons/ These motherfuckers are doing jumping jacks now." After the chorus, Eminem sings a bridge and focuses on a positive change, as he says "I just can't keep living this way, so starting today I'm breaking out of this cage." Before the final chorus, he says that he "shoots for the moon". The song features a choir composed of Kip Blackshire, Christal Garrick II, Terry Dexter, Rich King, Kristen Ashley Cole and Sly Jordan. This song is also about how Slim Shady is leaving Eminem so he can "handle his responsibilities as a father." He promises to get his life together for better. In his 2018 studio album Kamikaze, Fall shows him getting the Slim Shady part of him "back." As he desperately runs away from the shadow, it catches up with him and he realizes he can't escape it.

== Release and reception ==
On April 26, 2010, Eminem posted a message through his Twitter account that read, "I'm 'Not Afraid'", without any elaboration. Fans and news organizations were able to interpret the message and announced that Eminem's first single from his seventh studio album, Recovery would be titled "Not Afraid". Radio personality Angela Yee, from radio station WWPR-FM, confirmed that the new single would debut on Eminem's uncensored radio station, Shade 45. Eminem's manager, Paul Rosenberg, told Billboard that "It's not a dark song, it's an uplifting song."

The new single was initially slated to impact radio on April 30, 2010; however, the date was changed to three days earlier and the song eventually aired at 10 am ET, on Shade 45's show The Morning After with Angela Yee. On May 5, 2010, the single was made available for digital download at online retailers through Aftermath Entertainment and Interscope Records. In the song, Eminem makes a reference to Relapse and spoke at Friday Night with Jonathan Ross about it: "...looking back on it now in retrospect, I feel like there was a lot of stuff on there that was humorous and shock value and I had to go back and listen to my older material and figure out why ... Relapse didn't make me feel like [what] used to and kind of put the feeling back into what I do."

The song was featured in a trailer for the war film Act of Valor.

=== Pre-release promotion ===
Days before "Not Afraid"'s slated release, Eminem released a freestyle rap video to promote the release of the album's lead single. Titled "Despicable", the vocals in the video are played over the instrumental versions of "Over" by Canadian rapper Drake and "Beamer, Benz or Bentley" by former G-Unit member Lloyd Banks; the verse switches to the latter well into the two-minute song. Lyrics make a reference to football quarterback Ben Roethlisberger in the line "I'd rather turn this club into a bar room brawl/Get as rowdy as Roethlisberger in a bathroom stall." These lyrics refers to sexual assault allegations in March 2011 at a nightclub in Milledgeville, Georgia, causing controversy. Other references include those to fictional comic book character Superman: "I give as much of a flying fuck as that Superman dude" and to general popular culture: "Like a leaf suck in a vacuum, y'all/there ain't nothing but a whole lotta sucking going on in rap." Eminem's final lyric makes a reference to Looney Tunes character Daffy Duck.

Music critics commented on the freestyle rap. Ray Roa of music website Consequence of Sound noted Eminem's obvious frustration in the song, saying that he "sounds pissed off as ever on a new freestyle". He also added, "The first minute and a half of the track is mellow by his standards, but when the beat switches to Banks' track, Eminem goes apeshit." Melinda Newman of HitFix gave a positive review and wrote that the freestyle sounds like a "blast that sucks all the air out of room. It's better than anything on Relapse, and the sheer dexterity of his rhyming skills is awe-inspiring." Thaindian News's Madhuri Dey felt that "Eminem takes his usual route of taking a hit at some personality". Adam Downer of Sputnikmusic wrote positively: "Eminem spits with the crazed desperation we remember from the albums."

== Critical reception ==
Professional ratings
Review scores
Source	Rating
About.com	4.5/5 stars
Beats Per Minute	7/10 stars
Digital Spy	3/5 stars
Rolling Stone	3/5 stars

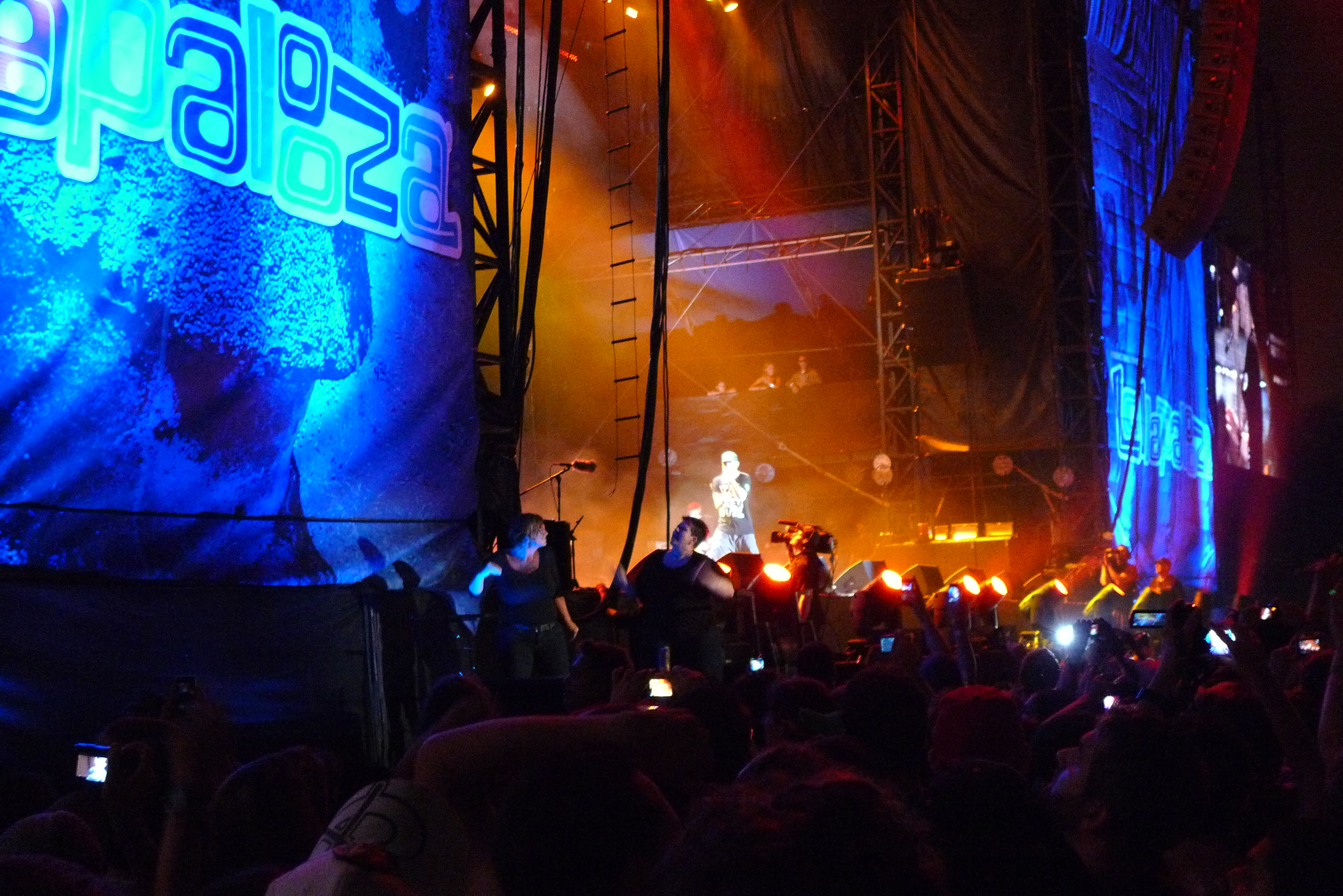
Eminem performing at the Lollapalooza festival in 2011

Reception of "Not Afraid" was generally positive. Jon Dolan of Rolling Stone praised the song's tone: "Over a dark, operatic beat. Eminem delivers rhymes that are typically acrobatic—and typically heavy-handed. But the anger has a gathering quality." Dolan also praised the song's inspirational theme. Henry Adaso of About.com gave a positive review on the song, noting "Boi-1da's bouncy charm" and "heartwrenching lyrics from a master poet" as good aspects of the song and noted no negative aspects. In Adaso's guide review, he praised Boi-1da's production and Eminem's affecting lyrics; he considered the former's work "shimmering" and Eminem's "sensitive lyrics entwine on this knocker"; overall, he gave the song four and a half stars out of a possible five. After the song's release, AllHipHop called it "an anthem in nature and rebellious to the core." In her review of the Recovery, Jody Rosen of Rolling Stone noted that even if Eminem—reaching his late 30s—is becoming "a grumpy middle-aged man, at least he's owning it". Winston Robbins of music website Consequence of Sound called "Not Afraid" one of the songs on Recovery "with catchy hooks, choruses, and beats multiplied by the endless pool of wit and anger that Eminem possesses". In his album review, Thomas Nassiff wrote on behalf of AbsolutePunk; he noted the song for being radio-friendly and that it "doesn't sacrifice anything to be friendly to the masses." Andy Gill of The Independent said that this is where "the only completely commendable sentiment on the entire album comes" and called it a "proud rehab anthem". In his review for Recovery, Benjamin Meadows-Ingram of Spin magazine called "Not Afraid" a "stadium-ready lead single"; he went on to say, "Finally, Eminem addresses his personal and professional failings head-on, rather than hiding behind a joke or inside a nightmare. It's a necessary first step in moving on."

After "Not Afraid" leaked onto the Internet on April 29, 2010, Simon Vozick-Levinson of Entertainment Weekly magazine commented on the song, noting both positive and negative characteristics; he first complimented Eminem's change of lyrical theme, calling it anthemic in nature and noting its inspirational and powerful message. He compared the song's theme to Eminem's 2002 single "Sing for the Moment" and his 2009 single, "Beautiful". Vozick-Levinson called Eminem's rapping "wild" but was dismissive of the production, saying, "The track behind 'Not Afraid' has the same tinny, repetitive, wannabe-epic quality that's annoyed me on Boi-1da productions like 'Forever.'" Mayer Nissem of British site Digital Spy gave the song three stars out of a possible five, and wrote a mixed review; the reviewer first commented, "Thank heavens! – Marshall Mathers III has opted against his usual trick of cobbling together a hook and some 'satire' via two-year-old back issues of the Inquirer to trail it." However, Nissem criticized other aspects of the song, saying that Eminem's "decision to chronicle ... feels a little worthy and more than a touch dull." He felt that Eminem's previous songs never bored the listener, unlike "Not Afraid". Jeff Weiss of the Los Angeles Times commented that "Not Afraid" was an improvement from the lead singles of Encore (2004) and Relapse, "Just Lose It" and "We Made You", respectively, giving for a more serious and inspirational theme. However, Weiss misses the comic nature of Eminem's classic singles, such as "My Name Is"; instead, he felt that the song was composed of "vague self-help bromides and a bombastic but nondescript beat from ... Boi-1da." When discussing the chorus, Weiss commented that it "doesn't make for very engaging listening." Finally, he discussed possible influences by American rapper T.I., but overall, he named it a disappointing lead single.

John Ulmer of website One Thirty BPM gave the song seven points out of a possible ten, and published a mixed review; he praised it for being a more serious track compared to previous lead singles "Just Lose It" (2004) and "We Made You" (2009) but criticized it for being less powerful compared to his 2002 hit single, "Lose Yourself", and "Beautiful". According to Ulmer, "Upon first listen it's a bit corny, but it's appropriately anthemic, and not bad enough to deter from the strength of the overall track." He noted that although Eminem does not have as much of a frustrated voice as he does in "Despicable", he admits that Relapse was a silly album. Pitchfork Media's Jayson Greene wrote a rather negative review on Recovery and was very dismissive on the song: "Eminem spends nearly half of Recovery insisting he's the best rapper alive, but for the first time in his career, he actually sounds clumsy." Kitty Empire of newspaper The Guardian also wrote negatively on the song in her album review, criticizing the song's lyrics: "Rhyming 'through a storm' with 'whatever weather/ cold or warm' in the chorus is unforgivable for a master rhymer." As part of his album review, Greg Kot of daily newspaper Chicago Tribune criticized Eminem's lyrics and rhymes in "Not Afraid", comparing them to his rhyming skills back when his 2002 hip hop drama film, 8 Mile, premiered: "Doesn't he realize that's the kind of cheese that the battle-rhyming Eminem of 8 Mile would've mercilessly mocked?"

== Chart performance ==
According to Nielsen SoundScan, "Not Afraid" sold 380,000 digital copies in its first week, giving Eminem the biggest sales week for a digital single between the beginning of 2010 and the date of the song's release. Three songs received higher sales during their first week: Flo Rida's "Right Round", The Black Eyed Peas' "Boom Boom Pow" and Eminem's "Crack a Bottle", which were all singles released in 2009.

On May 22, 2010, "Not Afraid" debuted on the Billboard Hot 100 at number one, a feat only 15 songs had accomplished previously. The song was Eminem's third number one single on the Hot 100 chart, coming after "Lose Yourself" and "Crack a Bottle". "Not Afraid" was also the first to debut at number one since October 17, 2009, when American recording artist Britney Spears's "3" debuted atop the chart. It became the first hip hop single by an unaccompanied male artist to debut at number one, and the first hip hop song to debut atop the chart, since "Doo Wop (That Thing)" by American rapper and singer Lauryn Hill in 1998.

After entering the Digital Songs chart at number one, the song fell down to number four the next week, and to number six on the Hot 100, with sales of 202,000 digital copies. On June 14, 2010, "Not Afraid" rose to number five again with sales of 157,000 copies. On July 14, 2010, it rose from 22 to 24 on the Hot 100; by then, the song was downloaded a total of 1,750,000 times. On July 25, 2010, the song crossed the two million mark, based on total sales. As of August 2013, the song has sold 5,000,000 digital copies. In June 2014, the song was certified 10× Platinum by RIAA.

In Canada, "Not Afraid" debuted at the top of the Canadian Hot 100, remaining on the chart for 20 weeks. In the United Kingdom, "Not Afraid" debuted and peaked at number five on the UK Singles Chart on May 30, 2010 – for the week ending date June 5, 2010. It dropped to number six the following week, to number ten on July 4, 2010 – for the week ending July 10, 2010 – and to number 14 the week after. On August 1, 2010, the song dropped to number 20 and its last appearance on the UK Singles Chart would be on August 29, giving the song a total of 14 weeks on the chart.

In New Zealand, "Not Afraid" entered and peaked at number eight on the New Zealand Singles Chart on May 10, 2010. Lasting on the chart for a total of twenty-three weeks, the song would not make its last chart appearance in New Zealand until September 9, 2010, at number Thirty-four. In Australia, the song entered at number sixteen on the Australian Singles Chart in its first week and reached its peak at number four the following week; its lowest and final chart position occurred during the song's twenty-seventh week on the chart, at number forty-eight.

On the Ö3 Austria Top 40, Austria's official singles chart, May 21, 2010 marked the song's chart debut, at number 22. It reached its peak on August 13, at number five and would stay at that position for another week. Before re-entering on January 14, 2011 at number 72, the song made a last consecutive chart appearance on November 19, 2011 at number 52. The song dropped to the bottom of the chart (number 75) on January 21, 2011, before exiting it. In Italy, the song only charted for one week, at number three; the same occurred in France, on February 19, 2011, at number 97.

"Not Afraid" lasted 19 weeks on the Irish Singles Chart and made a final chart appearance on September 30, 2010, at number 36. Flanders' chart, Ultratop 50, gave the song a debut position at number 13 on May 15, 2010; the song would not reach a higher position and would drop to number 49 in its 16th and final week. On Wallonia's chart, Ultratop 50, the song debuted at number 14 and would not chart again until July 3, 2010, at number 40. Longer than on any other chart, "Not Afraid" charted in Sweden for 43 consecutive weeks, debuting at number five and charting at number 49 in its final week.

== Music video ==
=== Development ===
"As I got sober, I started re-discovering things about myself that I had forgotten for so long that I kinda suppressed down, you know, or whatever [...] So, the whole theme of the record [is] as a person, I'm feeling better. See, this is how I feel; I feel good enough to be this, to say this, to do this."

— Eminem, talking about the video's concept in relation to the song's theme.

Before filming began, Eminem spoke to Paul Rosenberg on the telephone about his ideas for a music video of "Not Afraid"; the two shared thoughts and started collaborating in May 2010. American director Richard "Rich" Lee was hired to direct the video, which was shot on Market Street, in Newark, New Jersey, as well as New York City. On the first day, Eminem filmed the opening scene on the rooftop of the Manhattan Municipal Building. Lee called the moment "sort of like a very internal feeling kind of video". In an interview, while the video was being shot, Eminem spoke about working with Lee "as pretty anti-climactic, for the most part, you know what I mean... It's good working with him, you know, he's about his business". The scene in which Eminem jumps from a cliff and dives, was done at Greenpoint Warehouse, in Brooklyn with Lee and video producer Justin Diener. Also working with Eminem on the video included Dennis Dennehy and Chris Clancy for marketing. The final scene filmed on the first day was where Eminem would try to escape from a dark basement on a set built by production designer Ethan Tobman; shooting in Newark also continued.

The second day of shooting focused on Eminem as he walked through Market Street in Newark. Eminem's final shoot before wrapping up was a mirror scene, which included many glass mirrors, and a fake one among them, through which he would have to break through. On May 30, 2010, Eminem confirmed the video's release date in a Twitter message: "For those 'patiently waiting,' the NOT AFRAID video will premier Saturday 6/5. Details later..." The day before the video's premiere, a teaser trailer was uploaded onto video sharing site YouTube, which combines many clips from the full video. The music video was uploaded on video website Vevo on June 5, 2010 at 11:30 am ET. Vevo stylized their logo with the E reversed, similar to Eminem's logo. On June 7, the television premiere took place on MTV and VH1, and the former featured a primetime encore the day after.

=== Synopsis ===
A still of the music video, which shows Eminem flying through Market Street in Newark, New Jersey

The music video opens with a scene in which Eminem stands on the rooftop of the Manhattan Municipal Building in New York City, saying the introductory lyrics. The video cuts between scenes where he raps on the rooftop and another scene where Eminem is trapped inside a dark basement. Eminem moves closer towards the edge of the building until he leaves to go downstairs as the chorus begins. He starts walking down Market Street in Newark and jaywalks across the street, avoiding vehicles that pass by. Eminem sees distorted reflections of himself on the window of a car; he continues on, only to be surrounded by a series of mirrors. Confused, Eminem tries to escape, and towards the end of the second chorus, he breaks through a mirror to find himself in the middle of the street. Interspersing scenes show Eminem as he tries to break out of the basement. As the camera zooms out, the viewers see him on the edge of a destroyed street while a subway tunnel can be seen below the road.

Eminem then jumps off the edge and makes a steep dive, but flies straight up again; his speedy flight down Market Street causes sonic booms on vehicles nearby. Eventually, Eminem flies up, back to the rooftop of the Manhattan Municipal Building, where the video began.

=== Reception ===
The video was received with generally positive reviews. Following the video's Vevo release, Monica Herrera of Billboard named Eminem's jumping sequence "a moment of triumph" and compared his flying scene to Superman. She also noted similarities of the video's events and the song's lyrics, deeming them a powerful word to Eminem's haters, where Eminem raps about destroying one's balcony. Daniel Kreps from Rolling Stone felt that Eminem "similarly puts his redemption in the spotlight" and notices courage. Kreps went on to compare Eminem's flying scene to Canadian actor Keanu Reeves from the 1999 science fiction film The Matrix. In his review for Entertainment Weekly, Vozick-Levinson wrote: "We are to understand that he is once again at wit's end with the world, full of barely contained energy that he's not yet sure how to direct." Although he didn't feel that the video was Eminem's best, Vozick-Levinson praised the video for its message in relation to the song's vibe; he also made a comparison to Eminem's music video for "The Way I Am", as both videos involve Eminem as he jumps from a great height. Patrick D'Arcy of Spin thought that Eminem is "an satria unlikely motivational speaker, but an effective one."

With over a billion views, the video is Eminem's second-most viewed on YouTube after "Love the Way You Lie" from the same album.

== Live performances ==
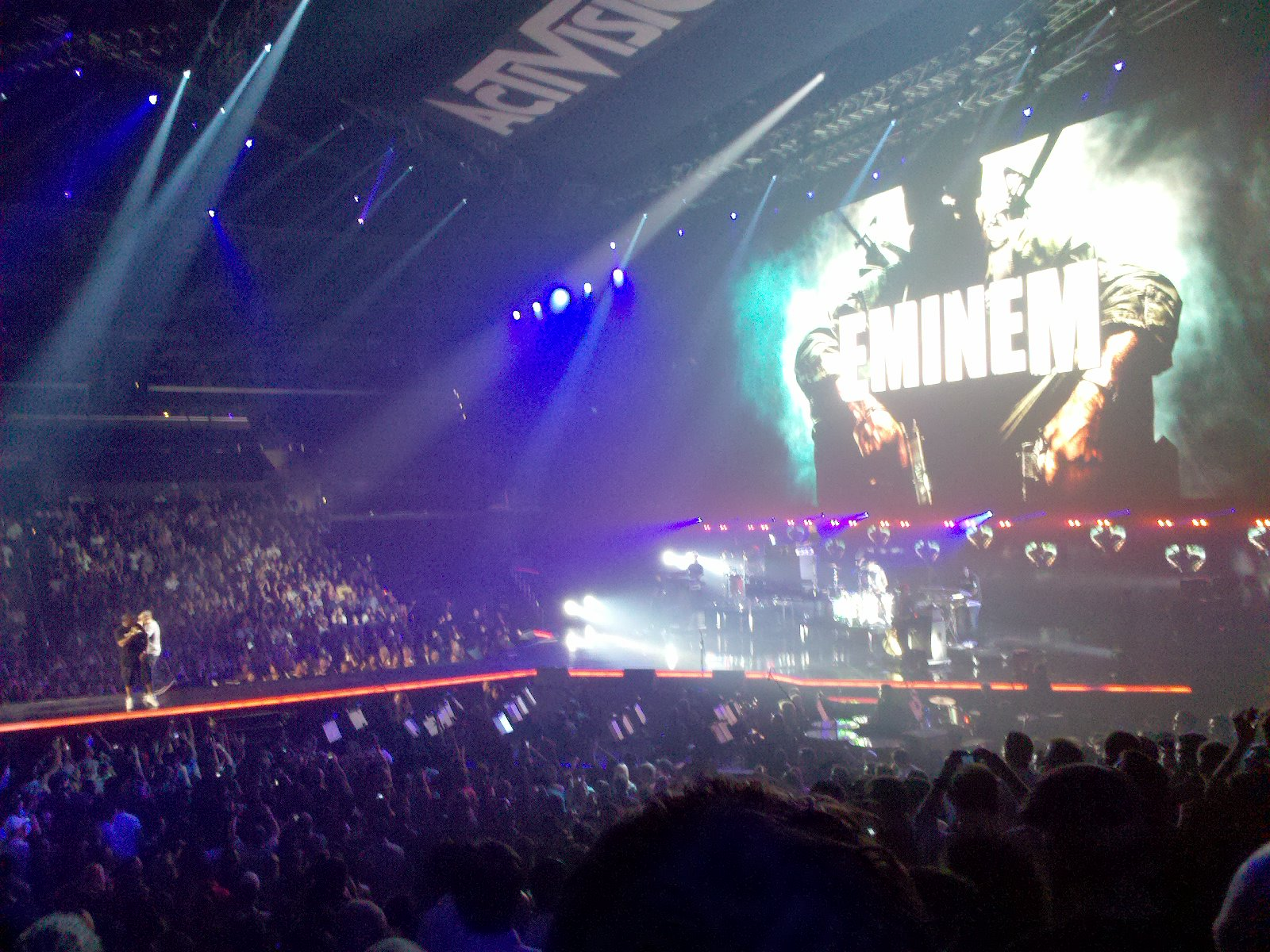
Eminem performing at E3 2010 at the Staples Center in Los Angeles

"Not Afraid" has become a mainstay at Eminem's concerts since 2010, with him typically performing it as the final song before his "Lose Yourself" encore.

On June 2, 2010, Eminem performed "Not Afraid" in France on the set of the French show Le Grand Journal. On June 5, 2010, Eminem performed "Not Afraid" on Friday Night with Jonathan Ross. In celebration of the then-upcoming release of Treyarch-developed shooter game Call of Duty: Black Ops, video game publisher Activision organized many artists to perform at the Electronic Entertainment Expo 2010 (E3 2010)—which took place at the Staples Center in Los Angeles—including Eminem. Joined by Blink-182 drummer Travis Barker, Eminem performed songs from his album, including "Not Afraid", "Love the Way You Lie" and "Won't Back Down". At E3 2011, a choir, as well as hypeman Mr. Porter sung with Eminem during the chorus of "Not Afraid", while his band played with an orchestra. The audience presumed the performance was over; however, Eminem shortly returned to the stage to end with "Lose Yourself". News distributor PR Newswire wrote, "Eminem ignited the crowd as he closed the all-star event". Matt Elias of MTV News also praised the show, and said that "Eminem performed an electrifying set ..., crushing any doubts that he is truly back in the game". Antony Bruno of Billboard called the performance "a literal bang" while Seve Appleford of Rolling Stone wrote, "The rapper marched along the catwalk with his usual intensity, previewing new songs from next week's release Recovery." Activision reportedly spent six million dollars on party costs.

"Not Afraid" was included on Eminem's set list as the final song before Eminem's "Lose Yourself" encore in his performance at the T in the Park festival, which took place on July 10, 2010. This would be his first European concert in five years. Eminem wore black shorts and a hoodie. He commented on the weather, saying, "I know it's muddy and sloppy and shit but this is fun", and also thanked the crowd for supporting him. "Everybody who's an Eminem fan, I just wanna say thank you so much for the support you've shown over the years, for not giving up on me," he said, "I hope you enjoyed the show as much as we did tonight. Peace." At the end of the performance, Eminem said, "Edin-borg, did you enjoy yourself tonight?" That evening, members of the audience accused Eminem of lip syncing, but others defended him of such accusations. The T in the Park performance of "Not Afraid" is included as the second track on the "Love the Way You Lie" CD single. Eminem performed "Not Afraid" for a small audience in a small room at the beginning of the 2010 MTV Video Music Awards; he performed the song once again at the Los Angeles Nokia Theatre, the main site of the ceremony, and performed "Love the Way You Lie" with Barbadian singer Rihanna. The audience voted his performance the best with 34 percent of all votes.

Eminem performed "Not Afraid" alongside Porter at the 2011 Bonnaroo Music Festival. He arrived in a Bad Meets Evil T-shirt, camouflage shorts, a black hoodie and a black hat. His set list included other hits from previous years, including "Cleanin' Out My Closet", "The Real Slim Shady", "Without Me" and "Like Toy Soldiers"; he also performed with Bad Meets Evil partner Royce da 5'9" for "Fast Lane" and "Lighters". Almost 80,000 members of the audience chanted "Shady!" for five minutes until Eminem returned to perform an encore with "Lose Yourself". Before performing "Not Afraid", Eminem told the audience, "All jokes aside... Thank you for sticking by me and not giving up on me." At one point during the show, he told them, "Everybody here tonight, I just wanna say thank you for sticking by me and not giving up on me." News sources praised the performance; James Montgomery of MTV News wrote, "what stood out the most about Em's performance was the sheer tenacity with which he attacked it." News agency Associated Press said that "Bonnaroo's crowd may be a hippie enclave, but you wouldn't have known it Saturday night". HitFix blog's Katie Hasty considered the "Not Afraid" performance "triumphant, perhaps due to crowd buzz". Patrick Doyle of Rolling Stone wrote, "Eminem's hour-and-a-half set was a triumph, with the rapper constantly bouncing across the stage, performing hit after hit with the energy of a prizefighter."

Eminem performed the song as part of a set list on the second day of Chicago's Lollapalooza festival with Porter, in front of an audience of 90,000 people. The Hollywood Reporter's Steve Baltin wrote, "given the infrequency with which he tours, it's sometimes easy to forget just how dynamic a performer he is, but after a spectacular 90-minute show, there was no denying the rapper's power." Adam Graham of The Detroit News said that "Eminem delivered the goods to the huge throng of people". Gil Kaufman of MTV News felt that "Eminem came, saw and conquered his Lollapalooza debut." Eminem performed a 28-song set list at Virgin Group's V Festival (V2011) on August 20, 2011 and the following day, which included "Not Afraid" as the final song before the encore of "Lose Yourself". The first day took place in Chelmsford, Essex and the second day took place in Staffordshire. Chris Salmon of The Guardian called Eminem's performance of "Not Afraid" "majestic"; he went on to writing that "It's a set fit to close any festival, pop-centred or otherwise." BBC's Chi Chi Izundu noted that Eminem's performance was "fast-paced".

Eminem also performed "Not Afraid" at the Michigan Central Station reopening concert in Detroit on Thursday, June 6, 2024.

== Awards and nominations ==
Year	Ceremony	Award	Result
2010	BET Hip Hop Awards (2010)	Verizon People's Champ Award	Nominated
2010	MTV Video Music Awards (2010)	Video of the Year	Nominated
2010	MTV Video Music Awards (2010)	Best Male Video	Won
2010	MTV Video Music Awards (2010)	Best Hip-Hop Video	Won
2010	MTV Video Music Awards (2010)	Best Art Direction	Nominated
2010	MTV Video Music Awards (2010)	Best Cinematography	Nominated
2010	MTV Video Music Awards (2010)	Best Direction	Nominated
2010	MTV Video Music Awards (2010)	Best Editing	Nominated
2010	MTV Video Music Awards (2010)	Best Special Effects	Nominated
2011	BMI Urban Awards	Award-Winning Song	Won
2011	Grammy Awards (53rd)	Best Rap Solo Performance	Won
2011	Grammy Awards (53rd)	Best Rap Song	Nominated
2011	Billboard Music Awards (2011)	Top Streaming Song (Video)	Nominated
2011	MTV Video Music Awards Japan (2011)	Best Hip-Hop Video	Won
2011	Detroit Music Awards	Outstanding National Single	Won
2011	Detroit Music Awards	Outstanding Video / Major Budget (Over $10,000)	Won

== Track listings and formats ==
Digital download

No.	Title	Writer(s)	Producer(s)	Length
1.	"Not Afraid"	Marshall Mathers; Drake Cooper; Luis Resto; Matthew Samuels; Jordan Evans; Matthew Burnett	Boi-1da; Jordan Evans^{[a]}; Matthew Burnett^{[a]}; Eminem^{[a]}	4:10

CD single

No.	Title	Writer(s)	Producer(s)	Length
1.	"Not Afraid"	Marshall Mathers; Drake Cooper; Luis Resto; Matthew Samuels; Jordan Evans; Matthew Burnett	Boi-1da; Jordan Evans^{[a]}; Matthew Burnett^{[a]}; Eminem^{[a]}	4:10
2.	"Not Afraid" (instrumental)	Mathers; Cooper; Resto; Samuels; Evans; Burnett	Boi-1da; Evans^{[a]}; Burnett^{[a]}; Eminem^{[a]}	4:10
Total length:				8:20

Notes

- ^{^[a]} signifies an additional producer.

== Credits and personnel ==
The credits for "Not Afraid" are adapted from the liner notes of Recovery.

Recording

- Recorded at: Effigy Studios in Ferndale, Michigan, Encore Studios in Burbank, California, and Ajax, Ontario.

Personnel

- Eminem – vocals, audio mixing, additional production and songwriting
- Boi-1da – producer, recording, songwriting and drums
- Jordan Evans – songwriting, additional production and strings
- Matthew Burnett – songwriting, additional production and strings
- Luis Resto – songwriting and keyboards
- Mike Strange – recording and audio mixing
- Joe Strange – engineering assistant
- Robert Reyes – choir vocals recording
- Kip Blackshire – choir vocals
- Christal Garrick II – choir vocals
- Terry Dexter – choir vocals
- Rich King – choir vocals
- Kristen Ashley Cole – choir vocals
- Sly Jordan – choir vocals

== Charts ==
=== Weekly charts ===
Chart (2010)	Peak position
Australia (ARIA)	4
Austria (Ö3 Austria Top 40)	5
Belgium (Ultratop 50 Flanders)	13
Belgium (Ultratop 50 Wallonia)	14
Brazil (ABPD)	20
Canada Hot 100 (Billboard)	1
CIS Airplay (TopHit)	144
Czech Republic Airplay (ČNS IFPI)	10
Denmark (Tracklisten)	5
Finland (Suomen virallinen lista)	8
France (SNEP)	97
Germany (GfK)	9
Ireland (IRMA)	3
Italy (FIMI)	3
Japan Hot 100 (Billboard)	2
Netherlands (Dutch Top 40)	32
Netherlands (Single Top 100)	14
New Zealand (Recorded Music NZ)	8
Norway (VG-lista)	3
Poland (Polish Dance Chart)	46
Poland (Video Chart)	4
Scottish Singles Sales (Official Charts)	4
South Korean International Singles (GAON)	2
Spain (Promusicae)	29
Sweden (Sverigetopplistan)	5
Switzerland (Schweizer Hitparade)	2
UK Singles (Official Charts)	5
UK Hip Hop/R&B (Official Charts)	2
US Billboard Hot 100	1
US Hot R&B/Hip-Hop Songs (Billboard)	70
US Hot Rap Songs (Billboard)	8
US Pop Airplay (Billboard)	15
US Rhythmic Airplay (Billboard)	12

=== Year-end charts ===
Chart (2010)	Position
Australia (ARIA)	22
Australia Hip-Hop/R&B Singles (ARIA)	10
Austria (Ö3 Austria Top 40)	30
Belgium (Ultratop 50 Flanders)	73
Canada Hot 100 (Billboard)	27
Germany (GfK)	39
Italy (FIMI)	76
Sweden (Sverigetopplistan)	34
Switzerland (Schweizer Hitparade)	15
Taiwan (Hito Radio)	53
UK Singles (Official Charts)	34
US Billboard Hot 100	24
US Hot Rap Songs (Billboard)	30
US Rhythmic Airplay (Billboard)	41

== Certifications ==
Region	Certification	Certified units/sales
Australia (ARIA)	11× Platinum	770,000^{‡}
Austria (IFPI Austria)	2× Platinum	60,000^{*}
Brazil (Pro-Música Brasil)	2× Diamond	500,000^{‡}
Denmark (IFPI Danmark)	Platinum	90,000^{‡}
Germany (BVMI)	3× Gold	900,000^{‡}
Italy (FIMI)	Platinum	30,000^{*}
Japan (RIAJ)	Gold	100,000^{*}
Mexico (AMPROFON)	Gold	30,000^{*}
New Zealand (RMNZ)	3× Platinum	90,000^{‡}
South Korea (Gaon Chart)	—	567,119
Spain (Promusicae)	Platinum	60,000^{‡}
Switzerland (IFPI Switzerland)	Platinum	30,000^{^}
United Kingdom (BPI)	3× Platinum	1,800,000^{‡}
United States (RIAA)	11× Platinum	11,000,000^{‡}
^{*} Sales figures based on certification alone.^{^} Shipments figures based on certification alone.^{‡} Sales+streaming figures based on certification alone.

== Release and radio add history ==
Country	Date	Format	Label	Ref
United Kingdom	June 14, 2010	CD single	Polydor	
United States	July 6, 2010	CD single	Shady; Aftermath; Interscope	
United States	April 27, 2010	Urban contemporary radio	Shady; Aftermath; Interscope	
Worldwide	May 3, 2010	Digital download	Shady; Aftermath; Interscope	

== See also ==
- Grammy Award for Best Rap Solo Performance
- List of best-selling singles
- List of best-selling singles in the United States
- List of best-selling singles in Australia
- List of Hot 100 number-one singles of 2010 (Canada)
- List of Hot 100 number-one singles of 2010 (US)
