= Jordan Evans (music producer) =

Canadian record producer (born 1991)

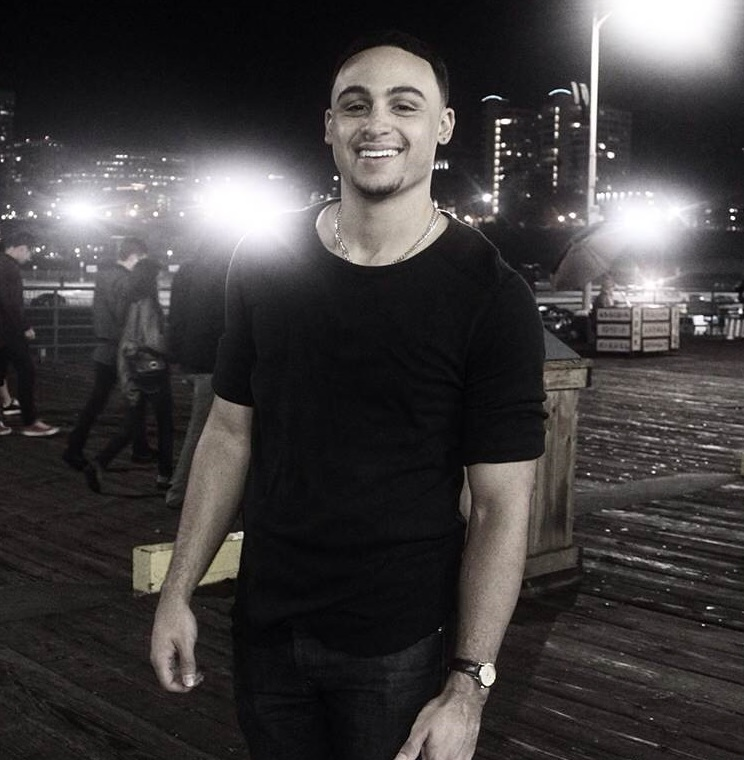
- Evans in 2011

Background information
- Born: Jordan D. C. Evans; January 22, 1991 (age 35); Toronto, Ontario, Canada
- Genres: Hip hop; R&B
- Occupations: Record producer; songwriter
- Instruments: Drum machine; sampler
- Years active: 2010–present
- Labels: Reclusive Music Inc.; Golden Child

Jordan D. C. Evans (born January 22, 1991) is a Canadian record producer. His production resume includes working with major recording artists like Jay-Z, Eminem, Drake, John Legend, Ellie Goulding, Chris Brown, and Daniel Caesar.

== Career ==
In June 2014, Eminem's 'Not Afraid' (co-produced by Jordan Evans) was certified Diamond by the Recording Industry Association of America (RIAA), surpassing 10 million copies.

The Instrumental for Drake's Single 'Pound Cake' (produced by Jordan Evans and Boi-1da) spawned a series of remixes and freestyles by many artists including Raekwon, Lupe Fiasco, the LOX, Meek Mill, Skeme, and Childish Gambino.

Evans, in collaboration with fellow producer Matthew Burnett and recording artist Daniel Caesar, founded Golden Child Recordings, an independent Canadian record label. Together, they achieved monumental success, marked by multiple sold out world tours and Platinum-selling singles, boasting billions of streams worldwide. Their visionary approach to music production and artistic expression earned them not only commercial acclaim but also critical recognition, with multiple Grammy and Juno awards & nominations.

In 2018 Evans won the Juno Award for R&B/Soul Recording of the Year for Caesar's debut studio album, Freudian.

In 2021, Evans won the Canadian Screen Award for Best Live Entertainment Special for his contribution as creative director to the 2021 Juno Awards televised broadcast.

In 2026, Evans won the Juno Award for Contemporary R&B/Soul Recording of the Year for Caesar's latest album, Son of Spergy.

Also in 2026, Evans won Billboard Canada's Manager of the Year award alongside Burnett.

== Discography ==
=== 2010 ===
Drake – Unreleased

- "Something"

Bun B – Trill OG

- "It's Been a Pleasure (feat. Drake)"

Eminem – Recovery

- "Not Afraid"

=== 2012 ===
Tyga – Careless World

- "I'm Gone" (feat. Big Sean)

Meek Mill – Dreams & Nightmares

- "Traumatized"

Kirko Bangz

- "Hold it Down" (feat. Young Jeezy)

Marsha Ambrosius

- "Get it Over With"

Childish Gambino – Royalty

- "Wonderful" (feat. John Osho)

=== 2013 ===
Drake – Nothing Was The Same

- "Pound Cake" (feat. Jay Z)

Rich Gang (Young Money) – Rich Gang

- "R.G." (feat. Mystikal)

Sean Leon – Ninelevenne, the Tragedy

- All production by Jordan Evans

Ben Stevenson

- "Opposites Attract"

Don Trip – Help Is On The Way

- "All On Me"

Doley Bernays – Just In Case

- "Drown"

Marsha Ambrosius – Friends and Lovers

- "Get It Over With"

=== 2014 ===
Game – Blood Moon: Year of the Wolf

- "Married To The Game" ft. (French Montana, Dubb & Sam Hook)

Freddie Gibbs

- "Hittaz"

G-Eazy – These Things Happen

- "Opportunity Costs"

Sean Leon – narcissus, THE DROWNING OF EGO

- All production by Jordan Evans

Daniel Caesar – Praise Break

- All Production by Jordan Evans

Chris Batson – Painless

* Produced with Chris Batson

=== 2015 ===
Jahkoy – Single

- "Vacay"

Daniel Caesar – Pilgrim's Paradise

- All production by Jordan Evans

Drake – If You're Reading This It's Too Late

- "How About Now"

Jamie Foxx – Hollywood: A Story of a Dozen Roses

- "You Changed Me" ft. (Chris Brown)

Kyle – Smyle

- "Remember Me?" ft. (Chance The Rapper)

PartyNextDoor

- "Some of Your Love"

Chris Batson

- '"Belong"

Various artists – Magic Mike XXL Original Motion Picture Soundtrack

- "How Does It Feel"

=== 2016 ===
PartyNextDoor

- "You Made It"

Ellie Goulding – Single

- "Just in Case"

SoMo – "The Answers"

- '"Control"

Daniel Caesar – Single

- "Won't Live Here"
- "Get You" (feat. Kali Uchis)
- "Japanese Denim"

=== 2017 ===
Chris Brown – Heartbreak on a Full Moon

- "Reddi Whip"

Daniel Caesar – Freudian (Executive Producer)

- "Get You"(feat. Kali Uchis)
- "Best Part"(feat. H.E.R)
- "Hold Me Down"
- "Neu Roses(Transgressor's Song)"
- "Loose"
- "We Find Love"
- "Blessed"
- "Take Me Away" (feat. Syd)
- "Transform" (feat. Charlotte Day Wilson)
- "Freudian"

H.E.R. – H.E.R.

- "Best Part" (feat. Daniel Caesar)

=== 2018 ===
Jessie Reyez – Single

- "Figures, a Reprise" (feat. Daniel Caesar)

Mez – Data Plan .001

- "The Shift"

Daniel Caesar – Single

- "Who Hurt You?"

=== 2019 ===
John Legend – Single

- "Preach" (Urban Radio Edit)

Daniel Caesar – CASE STUDY 01 (Executive Producer)

- "CYANIDE"
- "LOVE AGAIN" (Daniel Caesar & Brandy)
- "OPEN UP"
- "RESTORE THE FEELING" (feat. Sean Leon & Jacob Collier)
- "SUPERPOSITION" (feat. John Mayer) (additional production)

Daniel Caesar – Single

- "CYANIDE REMIX" (feat. Koffee)

Drake – Care Package

- "How Bout Now"

=== 2020 ===
Daniel Caesar – Spotify Singles

- "Made To Fall In Love"
- "Cyanide"

=== 2021 ===
Dylan Sinclair – Single

- "Black Creek Drive"

=== 2022 ===
Daniel Caesar – Single

- "Please Do Not Lean" (feat. BADBADNOTGOOD)

Giveon – Give or Take

- "Dec 11th"

=== 2023 ===
Daniel Caesar – NEVER ENOUGH

- "Ocho Rios"
- "Cool"
- "Homiesexual (feat. Ty Dolla $ign)"
- "Superpowers"
- "Please Do Not Lean (feat. BADBADNOTGOOD)"

=== 2024 ===
Charlotte Day Wilson - Cyan Blue

- "Dovetail"

=== 2025 ===
Daniel Caesar – Son of Spergy (Executive Producer with Mustafa)

- “Have A Baby (With Me)”
- “Call On Me”
- “Baby Blue” (feat. Norwill Simmonds)
- “Sins Of The Father” (feat. Bon Iver)

== Accolades ==
Evans has been nominated for multiple Grammy Awards and Juno Awards, among other accolades, as a songwriter and record producer. He won a Juno Award in 2018 for R&B/Soul Recording of the Year for Freudian.

=== Grammy Awards ===
| Year | Nominated work | Award | Result |
|---|---|---|---|
| 2011 - 53rd Grammy Awards | "Not Afraid" (Eminem) | Best Rap Song | Nominated |
| 2011 - 53rd Grammy Awards | "Not Afraid" (Eminem) | Best Rap Solo Performance | Won |
| 2013 - 56th Grammy Awards | "Nothing Was The Same" (Drake) | Best Rap Album | Nominated |
| 2018 - 60th Grammy Awards | "Freudian" (Daniel Caesar) | Best R&B Album | Nominated |

=== JUNO Awards ===
| Year | Nominated work | Award | Result |
|---|---|---|---|
| 2011 | "Recovery" (Eminem) | Best International Album | Nominated |
| 2013 | "Nothing Was the Same" (Drake) | Best Rap Album | Won |
| 2018 | Producer of the Year (Jordan Evans, Matthew Burnett) | Jack Richardson Producer of the Year | Nominated |
| 2018 | "Freudian" (Daniel Caesar) | R&B/Soul Recording of the Year | Won |
| 2026 | "Son of Spergy" (Daniel Caesar) | Contemporary R&B/Soul Recording of the Year | Won |

=== Canadian Screen Awards ===
| Year | Nominated work | Award | Result |
|---|---|---|---|
| 2021 | "Juno Awards of 2021" | Best Live Entertainment Special | Won |
