= Daniel Caesar discography =

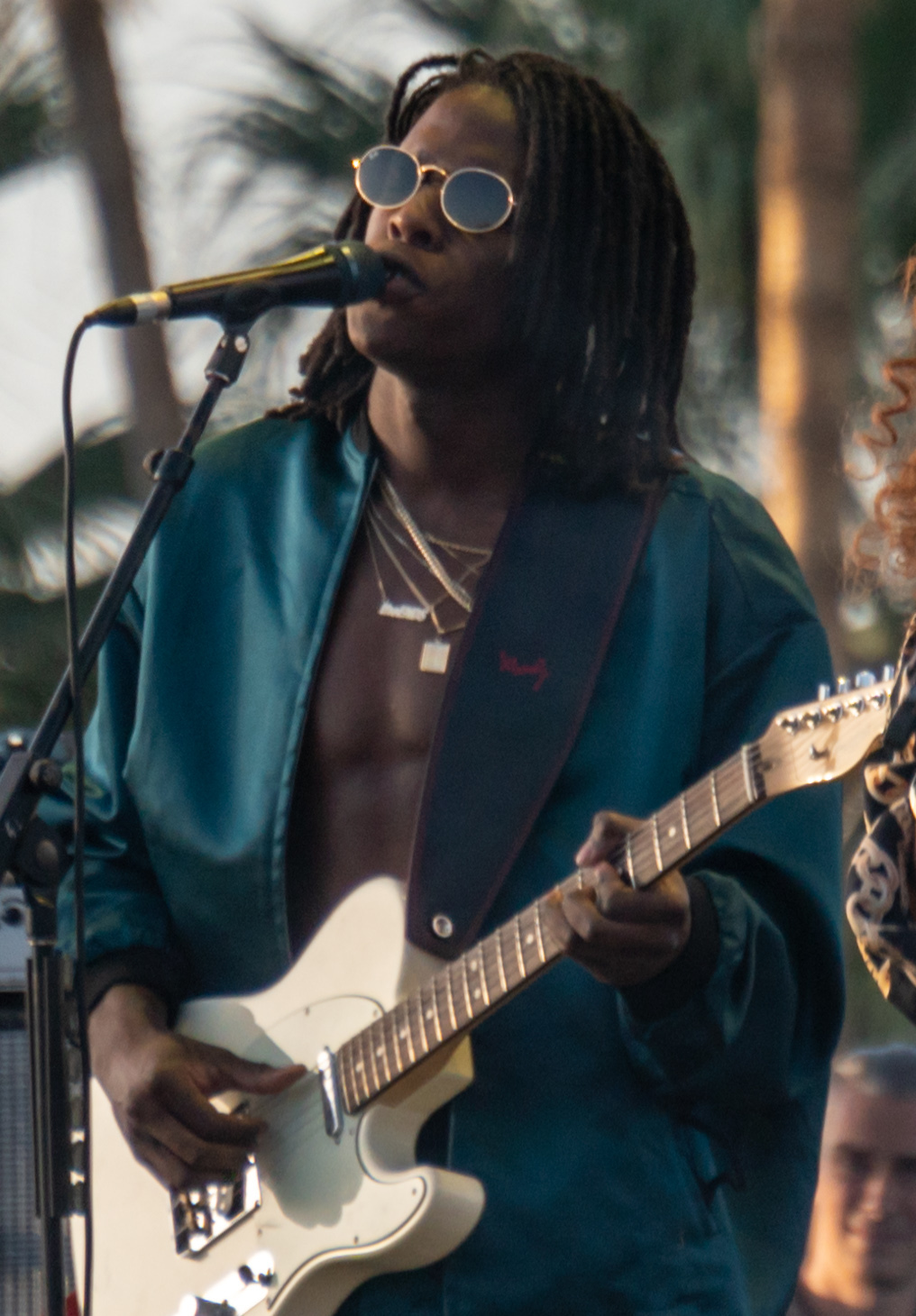
- Caesar at Coachella in 2018
- Studio albums: 4
- EPs: 5
- Singles: 23

Canadian musician Daniel Caesar has released four studio albums and one studio EP, among many singles including "Get You" featuring Kali Uchis and "Best Part" featuring H.E.R. As a featured artist, his most notable appearances are on the Justin Bieber RIAA 4-times platinum single "Peaches" and on the opening track on Tyler, the Creator's album Chromakopia, St. Chroma. He often collaborates with other Toronto-based artists such as BadBadNotGood, Charlotte Day Wilson, River Tiber, and Sean Leon.

== Albums ==
List of albums, with selected chart positions and sales figures
Title	Album details	Peak chart positions										Certifications
Title	Album details	CAN	AUS	BEL (FL)	NL	NZ	UK	UK R&B	US	US R&B/HH	US R&B	Certifications
Freudian	Released: August 25, 2017; Label: Golden Child Recordings; Formats: LP, digital download, streaming	16	—	192	127	39	—	15	25	16	6	MC: 2× Platinum; RIAA: Platinum; RMNZ: 3× Platinum
Case Study 01	Released: June 28, 2019; Label: Golden Child Recordings; Formats: CD, LP, digital download, streaming	6	26	186	39	—	89	—	17	10	3	MC: Gold
Never Enough	Released: April 7, 2023; Labels: Republic Records; Formats: CD, LP, digital download, streaming	8	43	193	—	15	60	4	14	6	2	MC: Gold; RIAA: Gold; BPI: Silver; RMNZ: Platinum
Son of Spergy	Released: October 24, 2025; Label: Republic Records; Formats: CD, LP, digital download, streaming	8	16	47	25	8	44	5	4	1	1	
"—" denotes items which were not released in that country or failed to chart.

== Extended plays ==
Title	Details
Birds of Paradise	Released: December 17, 2013; Label: Self-released; Format: Streaming
Praise Break	Released: September 22, 2014; Label: Self-released; Format: Streaming
Acoustic Break	Released: May 14, 2015; Label: Self-released; Format: Streaming
Pilgrim's Paradise	Released: November 12, 2015; Label: Golden Child Recordings; Formats: Digital download, streaming
Up Next Session: Daniel Caesar	Released: August 16, 2017; Label: Golden Child Recordings; Formats: Digital download, streaming

== Singles ==
=== As lead artist ===
List of singles as lead artist, with selected chart positions, showing year released and album name
Title	Year	Peak chart positions										Certifications	Album
Title	Year	CAN	NZ Hot	PHL Hot	POR	US	US R&B/ HH	US R&B	US R&B/HH Airplay	US Adult R&B	US Rock & Alt.	Certifications	Album
"Violet"	2014	—	—	—	—	—	—	—	—	—	—	RIAA: Gold	Praise Break
"Death and Taxes"	2015	—	—	—	—	—	—	—	—	—	—		Pilgrim's Paradise
"Streetcar"	2015	—	—	—	—	—	—	—	—	—	—	RMNZ: Gold; RIAA: Platinum	Pilgrim's Paradise
"Won't Live Here"	2016	—	—	—	—	—	—	—	—	—	—		Non-album singles
"Japanese Denim"	2016	—	—	—	—	—	—	—	—	13	—	MC: 2× Platinum; BPI: Silver; RIAA: 3× Platinum; RMNZ: 2× Platinum	Non-album singles
"Get You" (featuring Kali Uchis)	2016	—	—	34	—	93	41	5	7	1	—	MC: 4× Platinum; BPI: Platinum; RIAA: 7× Platinum; RMNZ: 4× Platinum	Freudian
"We Find Love"	2017	—	—	—	—	—	—	—	—	—	—	MC: Platinum; RIAA: Platinum; RMNZ: Platinum	Freudian
"Blessed"	2017	—	—	—	—	—	—	—	—	—	—	MC: Gold; RIAA: Platinum; RMNZ: Gold	Freudian
"Best Part" (with H.E.R.)	2017	—	—	21	184	75	32	4	11	1	— (Note: "Best Part" did not enter the Hot Rock & Alternative Songs chart, but peaked at number 33 on the Hot Alternative Songs chart.)	MC: 4× Platinum; BPI: Platinum; RIAA: 7× Platinum; RMNZ: 6× Platinum	Freudian
"Who Hurt You?"	2018	86	40	—	—	—	—	—	—	—	—	MC: Platinum; RIAA: Gold; RMNZ: Platinum	Non-album single
"Love Again" (with Brandy)	2019	95	15	—	—	— (Note: "Love Again" did not enter the Billboard Hot 100 chart, but peaked at number 24 on the Bubbling Under Hot 100 chart.)	—	13	21	1	—	MC: Gold; RIAA: Gold	Case Study 01
"Please Do Not Lean" (featuring BadBadNotGood)	2022	—	31	—	—	—	—	20	—	—	—		Never Enough (Bonus version)
"Do You Like Me?"	2023	83	10	—	—	—	—	24	—	—	—		Never Enough
"Let Me Go"	2023	—	15	—	—	—	—	16	50	18	—	RMNZ: Gold	Never Enough
"Valentina"	2023	—	28	—	—	—	—	17	—	—	—	RMNZ: Gold	Never Enough
"Unstoppable"	2023	—	—	—	—	—	—	—	—	—	—		Never Enough
"Waiting in Vain"	2024	—	—	—	—	—	—	—	—	—	—		Bob Marley: One Love (soundtrack)
"Rearrange My World" (with Rex Orange County)	2025	—	11	—	—	— (Note: "Rearrange My World" did not enter the Billboard Hot 100 chart, but peaked at number 11 on the Bubbling Under Hot 100 chart.)	—	—	—	—	14		Non-album singles
"There's a Field (That's Only Yours)" (with Rex Orange County)	2025	—	17	—	—	—	—	—	—	—	24		Non-album singles
"Have a Baby (With Me)"	2025	—	8	—	—	— (Note: "Have a Baby (With Me)" did not enter the Billboard Hot 100 chart, but peaked at number 11 on the Bubbling Under Hot 100 chart.)	31	12	26	6	—		Son of Spergy
"Call On Me"	2025	—	6	—	—	—	40	16	—	—	—		Son of Spergy
"Moon" (featuring Bon Iver)	2025	—	26	—	—	—	41	16	—	—	—		Son of Spergy
"Who Knows"	2026	50	8	11	—	52	13	6	—	27	—		Son of Spergy
"Indecision" (with Rex Orange County)	2026	—	16	—	—	—	—	—	—	—	49		Non-album single
"—" denotes items which were not released in that country or failed to chart.

=== As featured artist ===
List of singles as featured artist showing year released and album name
Title	Year	Peak chart positions										Certifications	Album
Title	Year	CAN	AUS	NL	NOR	NZ	POR	SWE	UK	US	US R&B/ HH	Certifications	Album
"West" (River Tiber featuring Daniel Caesar)	2016	—	—	—	—	—	—	—	—	—	—		Indigo
"Come Through" (Donnie featuring Daniel Caesar)	2016	—	—	—	—	—	—	—	—	—	—		Non-album single (Note: Originally released as a single on March 6, 2016, "Come Through" was later put on the 2019 From the Beginning to End album as "Life of the Party".)
"Matthew in the Middle" (Sean Leon featuring Daniel Caesar)	2016	—	—	—	—	—	—	—	—	—	—		I Think You've Gone Mad (Or the Sins of the Father)
"Tyrant (Remix)" (Kali Uchis featuring Daniel Caesar)	2017	—	—	—	—	—	—	—	—	—	—		Non-album singles
"Figures, a Reprise" (with Jessie Reyez)	2018	—	—	—	—	—	—	—	—	—	—		Non-album singles
"Forever Always" (Peter CottonTale featuring Rex Orange County, Chance the Rapper, Daniel Caesar, Madison Ryann Ward, and Yebba)	2018	—	—	—	—	—	—	—	—	—	—		Non-album singles
"Beauty & Essex" (Free Nationals featuring Daniel Caesar and Unknown Mortal Orchestra)	2018	—	—	—	—	—	—	—	—	—	—	RIAA: Gold; RMNZ: Gold	Free Nationals
"HER Love" (Common featuring Daniel Caesar)	2019	—	—	—	—	—	—	—	—	—	—		Let Love
"Time Alone With You" (Jacob Collier featuring Daniel Caesar)	2019	—	—	—	—	—	—	—	—	—	—		Djesse Vol. 3
"Peaches" (Justin Bieber featuring Daniel Caesar and Giveon)	2021	1	1	1	1	1	1	3	2	1	1	MC: 6× Platinum; ARIA: 5× Platinum; BPI: Platinum; GLF: 2× Platinum; RIAA: 4× Platinum; RMNZ: 5× Platinum	Justice
"Invincible" (Omar Apollo featuring Daniel Caesar)	2022	—	—	—	—	—	—	—	—	—	—		Ivory
"The Glade" (Sean Leon featuring Daniel Caesar)	2023	—	—	—	—	—	—	—	—	—	—		In Loving Memory
"St. Chroma" (Tyler, the Creator featuring Daniel Caesar)	2024	21	15	53	37	11	29	93	15	7	1	MC: Gold; BPI: Silver; RIAA: Platinum	Chromakopia
"The Field" (Blood Orange featuring The Durutti Column, Tariq Al-Sabir, Caroline Polachek and Daniel Caesar)	2025	—	—	—	—	38	—	—	—	—	—		Essex Honey
"Blue" (Millennium Parade featuring Saya Gray and Daniel Caesar)	2026	—	—	—	—	—	—	—	—	—	—		Non-album single; ED theme for the anime series The Ghost in the Shell
"—" denotes a recording that did not chart or was not released in that territory.

== Other charted and certified songs ==
List of other charted and certified songs, with selected chart positions, showing year released and album name
Title	Year	Peak chart positions										Certifications	Album
Title	Year	CAN	NZ Hot	PHL Hot	US	US R&B/ HH	US R&B	US R&B/HH Airplay	US Adult R&B	US Dance/ Elect.	US Rock & Alt.	Certifications	Album
"Hold Me Down"	2017	—	—	48	—	—	—	—	—	—	—	MC: Gold; RIAA: Platinum; RMNZ: Platinum	Freudian
"Loose"	2017	—	—	—	—	—	—	—	—	—	—	RMNZ: Platinum; RIAA: Platinum	Freudian
"Entropy"	2019	—	29	—	—	—	—	—	—	—	—		Case Study 01
"Cyanide" (Solo or the remix featuring Koffee)	2019	—	25	—	—	—	—	—	—	—	—	MC: Platinum; RIAA: Platinum; RMNZ: Platinum	Case Study 01
"Superposition" (featuring John Mayer)	2019	—	22	—	—	—	—	—	—	—	—		Case Study 01
"Careless" (FKA Twigs featuring Daniel Caesar)	2022	—	—	—	—	—	—	—	—	31	—		Caprisongs
"Reach the Sunshine" (Lil Yachty featuring Daniel Caesar)	2023	—	—	—	—	—	—	—	—	—	43		Let's Start Here
"Ocho Rios"	2023	—	28	—	—	—	—	—	—	—	—		Never Enough
"Toronto 2014" (with Mustafa)	2023	—	31	—	—	—	—	—	—	—	—		Never Enough
"Always"	2023	70	8	25	— (Note: "Always" did not enter the Billboard Hot 100 chart, but peaked at number 12 on the Bubbling Under Hot 100 chart.)	40	12	26	7	—	—	RIAA: Platinum; RMNZ: Platinum	Never Enough
"Superpowers"	2023	—	—	79	—	—	21	—	—	—	—	RIAA: Gold; RMNZ: Platinum	Never Enough
"Take Your Mask Off" (Tyler, the Creator featuring Daniel Caesar and LaToiya Williams)	2024	53	—	—	42	16	—	—	—	—	—	RIAA: Gold	Chromakopia
"Rain Down" (featuring Sampha)	2025	—	15	—	— (Note: "Rain Down" did not enter the Billboard Hot 100 chart, but peaked at number 24 on the Bubbling Under Hot 100 chart.)	38	14	—	—	—	—		Son of Spergy
"Baby Blue" (featuring Norwill Simmonds)	2025	—	20	—	— (Note: "Baby Blue" did not enter the Billboard Hot 100 chart, but peaked at number 23 on the Bubbling Under Hot 100 chart.)	37	13	—	—	—	—		Son of Spergy
"Root of All Evil"	2025	87	11	—	— (Note: "Root of All Evil" did not enter the Billboard Hot 100 chart, but peaked at number 6 on the Bubbling Under Hot 100 chart.)	28	11	—	—	—	—		Son of Spergy
"Touching God" (featuring Yebba and Blood Orange)	2025	—	—	—	—	46	18	—	—	—	—		Son of Spergy
"Sign of the Times"	2025	—	—	—	—	49	19	—	—	—	—		Son of Spergy
"Emily's Song"	2025	—	—	—	— (Note: "Emily's Song" did not enter the Billboard Hot 100 chart, but peaked at number 25 on the Bubbling Under Hot 100 chart.)	39	15	—	—	—	—		Son of Spergy
"No More Loving (On Women I Don't Love)" (featuring 646yf4t)	2025	—	—	—	—	—	23	—	—	—	—		Son of Spergy
"Sins of the Father" (featuring Bon Iver)	2025	—	—	—	—	—	22	—	—	—	—		Son of Spergy
"—" denotes items which were not released in that country or failed to chart.

== Guest appearances ==
List of non-single guest appearances, with other performing artists, showing year released and album name
Title	Year	Other artist(s)	Album
"Give Me Jesus"	2012	Norwill Simmonds — his father	Can You Feel His Love
"Pacific Coast Highway"	2013	Sean Leon	Ninelevenne, The Tragedy
"Track Ten"	2013	Sean Leon	Ninelevenne, The Tragedy
"Fucked Up"	2015	Jiin	Cult Hymns
"God"	2015	Jiin	Cult Hymns
"Fill the Void" (featuring Amir Obè)	2016	Stwo	D.T.S.N.T.
"The Drowning Man"	2017	Sean Leon	I Think You've Gone Mad (Or the Sins of the Father)
"My Reality"	2020	Aminé	Limbo
"Danny's Interlude"	2021	Charlotte Day Wilson	Alpha
"Careless"	2022	FKA Twigs	Caprisongs
"Rain" (featuring 070 Shake)	2022	KayCyy	Get Used To It
"Reach the Sunshine"	2023	Lil Yachty	Let's Start Here
"Leaving Toronto"	2024	Mustafa	Dunya
"Take Your Mask Off" (featuring LaToiya Williams)	2024	Tyler, the Creator	Chromakopia

== Songwriting credits ==
List of songs written or co-written for other artists, showing year released and album name
Title	Year	Artist	Album
"Suburbia (Heaven Or)"	2017	Sean Leon	I Think You've Gone Mad (Or the Sins of the Father)
"Telling the Truth" (featuring Kaytranada)	2017	Mary J. Blige	Strength of a Woman
"Broken Clocks"	2017	SZA	Ctrl
"Saturn" (featuring Kwabs)	2018	Nao	Saturn
"Mountains"	2019	Charlotte Day Wilson	Alpha
"Monster"	2020	Shawn Mendes and Justin Bieber	Wonder
"Up from the Ashes"	2021	Kanye West	Donda (Deluxe)
"If You Feel Like Leaving Me"	2022	Dylan Sinclair	No Longer in the Suburbs
"Alive!"	2023	Bakar	Halo
"I Killed You"	2024	Tyler, the Creator	Chromakopia
"Tomorrow"	2024	Tyler, the Creator	Chromakopia
"Balloon"	2024	Tyler, the Creator	Chromakopia
"I Hope You Find Your Way Home"	2024	Tyler, the Creator	Chromakopia
