= Daniel Caesar =

Canadian singer-songwriter (born 1995)

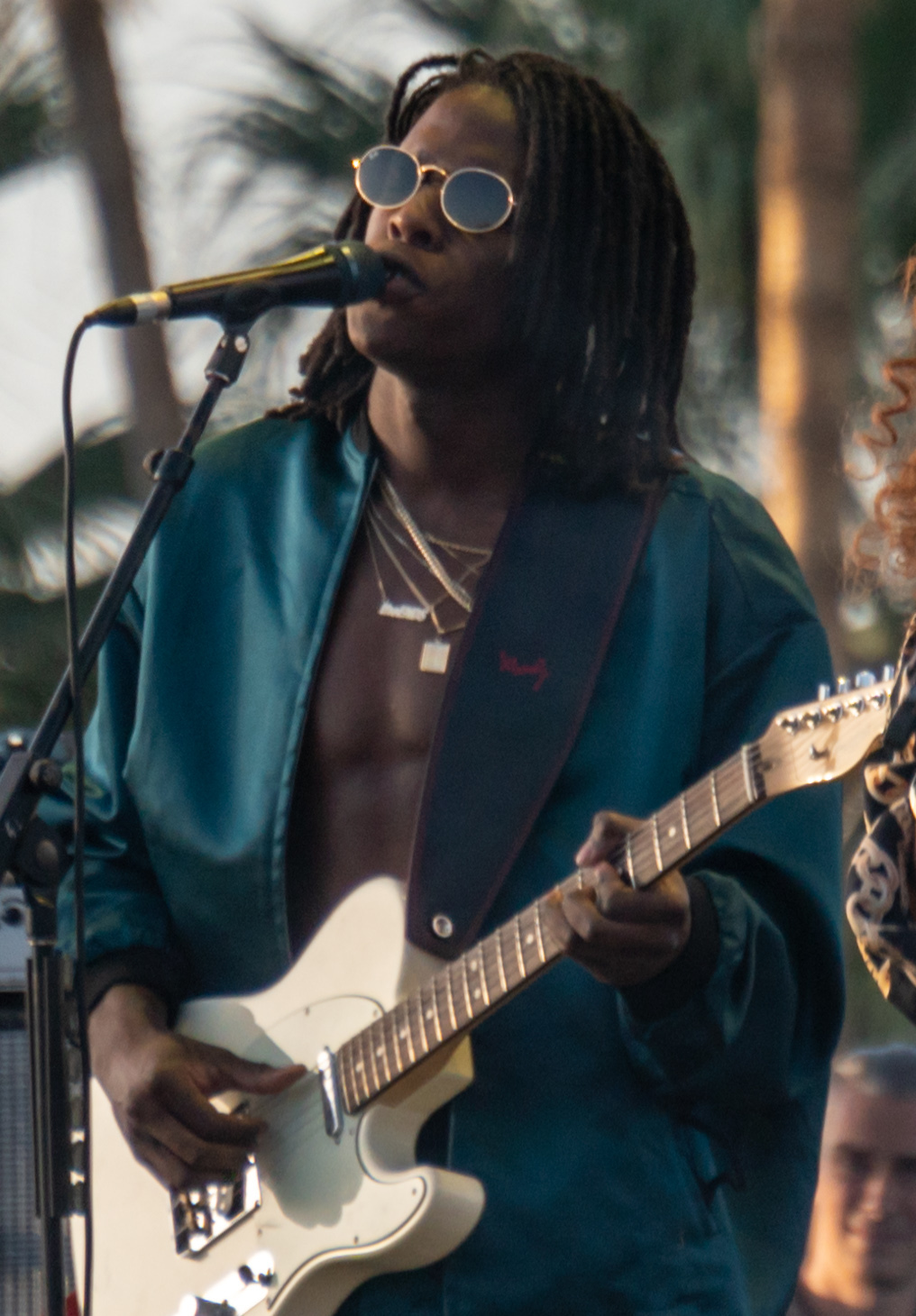
- Caesar performing in 2018

Background information
- Born: Ashton Dumar Norwill Simmonds; April 5, 1995 (age 31); Scarborough, Ontario, Canada
- Origin: Oshawa, Ontario, Canada
- Genres: R&B; neo soul
- Occupations: Singer; songwriter
- Instruments: Vocals; guitar
- Works: Discography
- Years active: 2012–present
- Labels: Republic; Golden Child
- Website: danielcaesar.com

Ashton Dumar Norwill Simmonds (born April 5, 1995), known professionally as Daniel Caesar, is a Canadian singer and songwriter. After independently building a following through the release of two EPs, Praise Break (2014) and Pilgrim's Paradise (2015), Caesar released his debut studio album, Freudian, in 2017, which received three Grammy Award nominations, winning for the collaboration with American singer H.E.R. "Best Part". In 2019 he released his second studio album, Case Study 01, longlisted for the 2020 Polaris Music Prize.

In 2021 Caesar featured alongside Giveon on Justin Bieber's single "Peaches", his first number-one song on the US Billboard Hot 100, and receiving four nominations at the 64th Annual Grammy Awards. In 2023 Caesar published his third studio album, Never Enough through Republic Records, winning his second Juno Award. In 2025, Caesar released his fourth studio album Son of Spergy, which became his third top-ten album on the Billboard Canadian Albums and first on the Billboard 200.

Through his career, Caesar has collaborated with several artists, including Brandy, Kali Uchis, Ty Dolla Sign, Summer Walker, Common, Omar Apollo, Bon Iver, and has written songs for Mary J. Blige, SZA, Tyler, the Creator, Shawn Mendes and Kanye West. He was also awarded with a total of four Juno Awards, two Soul Train Music Awards, a MTV Video Music Awards and an ASCAP Awards.

== Early life ==
Ashton Dumar Norwill Simmonds was born on April 5, 1995, in the Scarborough district of Toronto, Ontario, and raised in Oshawa. He is the second eldest of four children to his mother Hollace Burnett-Simmonds and father Norwill Simmonds, a gospel singer who released his first album as a high school student in Jamaica. Caesar attended the Seventh-day Adventist Church and private school in Oshawa. He is of Bajan and Jamaican descent. Caesar grew up in church, singing before his father's congregation in Oshawa. He was raised listening to soul and gospel delivered through musicality and religion, even though his parents were cautious of temptations that came with music. Caesar longed for the city, which was a one-hour drive from his home.

== Career ==
=== 2013–2017: Career beginnings and Freudian ===
At the age of 17, Caesar was kicked out of the house after a fight with his father on the weekend of his high school graduation; he was briefly homeless during this time. He felt no choice but to pursue his calling as a musician. After leaving his home, he began doing gigs. He connected with producers and future collaborators Jordan Evans and Matthew Burnett and began writing and recording what would be his debut EP Praise Break in 2014; it was No. 19 on the "20 Best R&B Albums of 2014" by Rolling Stone and the top projects of 2014 by Noisey Canada.

Caesar's career gained notability in 2015, with the release of his second EP, Pilgrim's Paradise. The album received positive critical acclaim and, while not immediately a commercial success, "Streetcar", the cover of Kanye West's 2008 song "Street Lights", became a fan favorite.

On August 25, 2017, Caesar released his debut album Freudian, which includes the singles "Get You", "We Find Love", and "Blessed". The album featured artists like Kali Uchis, H.E.R., Syd, and Charlotte Day Wilson. It also included uncredited vocals from the Cadaro Tribe. The album was a shortlisted finalist for the 2018 Polaris Music Prize. At the 60th Annual Grammy Awards, Caesar received two nominations for Best R&B Album and Best R&B Performance for "Get You". At the 61st Annual Grammy Awards, Caesar won Best R&B Performance for his single "Best Part".

=== 2018–2024: Case Study 01 and Never Enough ===
In March 2019, Caesar received backlash for defending his friend Julieanna Goddard via an Instagram live stream. Goddard had been criticized for her racist comments on Black people, particularly those regarding Black women. He later apologized for his comments.

Caesar released his sophomore studio album, Case Study 01 on June 28, 2019. The album featured guest appearances from Brandy, Pharrell Williams, John Mayer, Sean Leon and Jacob Collier. The record was supported by the single, "Love Again" with Brandy which received a nomination for Best R&B Performance at the 62nd Grammy Awards.

On March 19, 2021, Caesar appeared alongside Giveon on Justin Bieber's "Peaches" from Justice. The track marked Caesar's first to top both the Canadian Hot 100 and the Billboard Hot 100. It was later certified 6× platinum by Music Canada and 4× platinum by the RIAA. Alongside its commercial success, the track garnered four nominations at the 64th Annual Grammy Awards.

Caesar released his third studio album, Never Enough, through Republic Records on April 7, 2023. In October 2024, he appeared on Tyler, the Creator's eighth studio album Chromakopia, providing vocals for five tracks on the album, including opening track "St. Chroma" and "Tomorrow", which Caesar co-wrote and performed bass on. At the Juno Awards of 2024, Caesar received five nominations, winning for Contemporary R&B/Soul Recording of the Year.

=== 2025–present: Son of Spergy ===
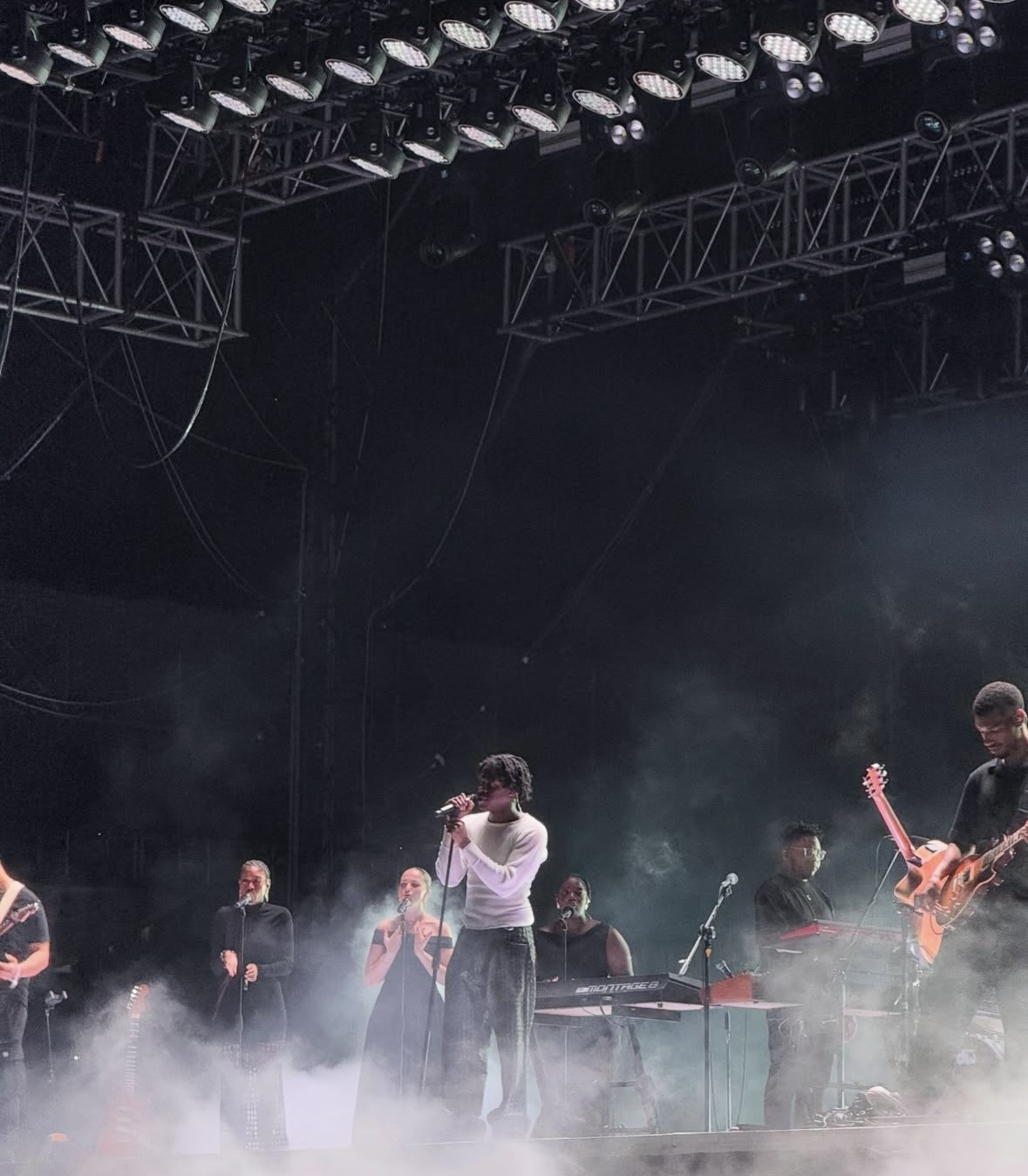
Caesar performing at Wanderland in Manila in 2025

On Valentine's Day, Caesar collaborated with Rex Orange County, creating a two-track release titled “Rearrange My World / There's a Field (That's Only Yours)”. In mid-July, Caesar announced a new album titled Son of Spergy, which was released on October 24, 2025. In an interview with Clash music magazine, Caesar said that the album was born from the spirit of reconciliation with his parents, and that "Spergy" is his father's nickname. In the album, he confronts masculinity, faith, and the sense of self-importance. The album features collaborations with Sampha, Bon Iver, Yebba, Blood Orange, up-and-coming artist 646yf4t, and his father Norwill Simmonds, who is a gospel singer. NME magazine also notes the strong gospel influence in the album and the presence of recordings of muffled chatter, which reflect Caesar's family.

== Inspirations and artistry ==
Caesar's stage name derives from a combination of the Roman dictator Julius Caesar and the biblical figure Daniel, showing recognition to the topics he explores through his music. His music draws from his childhood experiences and integrates them with R&B and electronics, while his lyrics explore subjects of religion, philosophy and unrequited love. In his music, he often references concepts of philosophy. Caesar heavily influenced by soul and gospel, his singing voice reshapes itself on each track, often veering into a hushed, introspective lilting style. According to Caesar, "In my religious surroundings growing up, the point is to be still, to direct as little attention to yourself as possible and instead, direct all attention to what you’re saying. Now, it’s kind of the opposite." Caesar cites Frank Ocean, D’Angelo, Kanye West, Beyoncé, Stevie Wonder, and The Doors frontman Jim Morrison as musical and stylistic inspirations.

Caesar works in close collaboration with producers Matthew Burnett and Jordan Evans, with whom he co-founded his independent label, Golden Child Recordings, and has co-produced almost all of his music with since 2015. Caesar is also part of an informal collaborative of Toronto-based musicians and songwriters that includes River Tiber, BadBadNotGood, and Charlotte Day Wilson, among others.

== Discography ==
- Freudian (2017)
- Case Study 01 (2019)
- Never Enough (2023)
- Son of Spergy (2025)

== Awards and nominations ==
Award	Year (Note: Indicates the year of ceremony. Each year is linked to the article about the awards held that year, wherever possible.)	Work	Category	Result	Ref.
American Music Awards	2021	"Peaches" (with Justin Bieber and Giveon)	Collaboration of the Year	Nominated	
American Music Awards	2026	Daniel Caesar	Best Male R&B Artist	Pending	
BET Awards	2017	Daniel Caesar	International Viewers' Choice Award	Nominated	
BET Awards	2018	Daniel Caesar	Best Male R&B/Pop Artist	Nominated	
BET Awards	2018	Daniel Caesar	Best New Artist	Nominated	
Billboard Music Awards	2022	"Peaches"	Top Collaboration	Nominated	
Billboard Music Awards	2022	"Peaches"	Top R&B Song	Nominated	
Grammy Awards	2018	Freudian	Best R&B Album	Nominated	
Grammy Awards	2018	"Get You" (with Kali Uchis)	Best R&B Performance	Nominated	
Grammy Awards	2019	"Best Part" (with H.E.R)	Best R&B Performance	Won	
Grammy Awards	2020	"Love Again" (with Brandy)	Best R&B Performance	Nominated	
Grammy Awards	2022	Justice (as featured artist and songwriter)	Album of the Year	Nominated	
Grammy Awards	2022	"Peaches"	Record of the Year	Nominated	
Grammy Awards	2022	"Peaches"	Song of the Year	Nominated	
Grammy Awards	2022	"Peaches"	Best R&B Performance	Nominated	
Grammy Awards	2022	"Peaches"	Best Music Video	Nominated	
iHeartRadio MuchMusic Video Awards	2017	Daniel Caesar	Best New Canadian Artist	Nominated	
iHeartRadio Music Awards	2019	Daniel Caesar	R&B Artist of the Year	Nominated	
iHeartRadio Music Awards	2022	"Peaches"	Song of the Year	Nominated	
iHeartRadio Music Awards	2022	"Peaches"	Best Collaboration	Nominated	
iHeartRadio Music Awards	2022	"Peaches"	Best Music Video	Nominated	
Juno Awards	2017	Pilgrim's Paradise	R&B/Soul Recording of the Year	Nominated	
Juno Awards	2018	Daniel Caesar	Artist of the Year	Nominated	
Juno Awards	2018	Freudian	R&B/Soul Recording of the Year	Won	
Juno Awards	2020	"Case Study 01"	R&B/Soul Recording of the Year	Nominated	
Juno Awards	2022	"Peaches"	Single of the Year	Nominated	
Juno Awards	2023	"Please Do Not Lean" (feat. BadBadNotGood)	Traditional R&B/Soul Recording of the Year	Nominated	
Juno Awards	2024	Daniel Caesar	Artist of the Year	Nominated	
Juno Awards	2024	Daniel Caesar	Fan Choice Award	Nominated	
Juno Awards	2024	Never Enough	Album of the Year	Nominated	
Juno Awards	2024	Never Enough	Contemporary R&B/Soul Recording of the Year	Won	
Juno Awards	2024	"Always"	Single of the Year	Nominated	
Juno Awards	2026	Daniel Caesar	Artist of the Year	Nominated	
Juno Awards	2026	Daniel Caesar	Songwriter of the Year	Won	
Juno Awards	2026	Son of Spergy	Contemporary R&B/Soul Recording of the Year	Won	
Juno Awards	2026	"Have a Baby (With Me)"	Traditional R&B/Soul Recording of the Year	Nominated	
MTV Europe Music Awards	2021	"Peaches"	Best Song	Nominated	
MTV Europe Music Awards	2021	"Peaches"	Best Video	Nominated	
MTV Video Music Awards	2021	"Peaches"	Best Pop	Won	
MTV Video Music Awards	2021	"Peaches"	Best Collaboration	Nominated	
MTV Video Music Awards	2021	"Peaches"	Best Editing	Nominated	
MTV Video Music Awards	2021	"Peaches"	Song of Summer	Nominated	
People's Choice Awards	2021	"Peaches"	The Song of 2021	Nominated	
People's Choice Awards	2021	"Peaches"	The Music Video of 2021	Nominated	
People's Choice Awards	2021	"Peaches"	The Collaboration Song of 2021	Nominated	
Soul Train Music Awards	2018	Daniel Caesar	Best New Artist	Won	
Soul Train Music Awards	2018	Daniel Caesar	Best R&B/Soul Male Artist	Nominated	
Soul Train Music Awards	2018	"Broken Clocks" (as songwriter)	The Ashford And Simpson Songwriter's Award	Nominated	
Soul Train Music Awards	2018	"Best Part" (featuring H.E.R.)	The Ashford And Simpson Songwriter's Award	Nominated	
Soul Train Music Awards	2018	"Best Part" (featuring H.E.R.)	Best Collaboration Performance	Won	
Soul Train Music Awards	2019	Daniel Caesar	Soul Train Certified Award	Nominated	
Soul Train Music Awards	2019	Daniel Caesar	Best R&B/Soul Male Artist	Nominated	
Soul Train Music Awards	2026	"Who Knows"	R&B/Soul Song of The Year	Pending	

=== Other awards ===
Year	Ceremony	Nominee / work	Award	Result	Ref.
2016	Polaris Music Prize	Pilgrim's Paradise	–	Longlisted	
2018	Polaris Music Prize	Freudian	–	Shortlisted	
2020	Polaris Music Prize	Case Study 01	–	Longlisted	
2023	Polaris Music Prize	Never Enough		Shortlisted	
2016	SOCAN Songwriting Prize	"Paradise" (featuring BADBADNOTGOOD)	–	Nominated	
2017	SOCAN Songwriting Prize	"Won't Live Here"	–	Nominated	
2021	MTV Millennial Awards	"Peaches"	Global Hit	Nominated	
2021	MTV Millennial Awards Brazil	"Peaches"	Global Hit	Nominated	
2021	MTV Video Play Awards	"Peaches"	Winning Videos	Won	
2021	NRJ Music Awards	"Peaches"	International Song of the Year	Nominated	
2022	ASCAP Awards	"Peaches"	Winning Songwriters & Publishers	Won	

== Concert tours ==
Headlining

- Freudian, a World Tour (2017–2018)
- Case Study 01: Tour (2019)
- Almost Enough: The Intimate Sessions (2023)
- Superpowers World Tour (2023)
- Son of Spergy Tour (2026)
