= Get You (Daniel Caesar song) =

- Original digital download cover. It later served as the cover for the re-release of "Japanese Denim".

Single by Daniel Caesar featuring Kali Uchis

from the album Freudian
- Written: 2015
- Released: October 20, 2016
- Studio: Coalition Recording (Toronto); Studio 69 (Toronto)
- Genre: R&B
- Length: 4:37
- Label: Golden Child
- Songwriters: Daniel Caesar; Kali Uchis
- Producers: Jordan Evans; Matthew Burnett

Daniel Caesar singles chronology
"Get You" (2016)	"We Find Love" "Blessed" (2017)

Kali Uchis singles chronology
"Only Girl" (2016)	"Get You" (2016)	"Tyrant" (2017)

Music video
- "Get You" on YouTube

"Get You" is a song by Canadian singer and songwriter Daniel Caesar, featuring Colombian-American singer and songwriter Kali Uchis. It was released on October 20, 2016, as the lead single from Caesar's debut studio album, Freudian (2017), with the b-side, "Japanese Denim". "Get You" was written by Caesar and Uchis, with production of both tracks handled by Jordan Evans and Matthew Burnett in collaboration with BadBadNotGood.

"Get You" was nominated for Best R&B Performance at the 60th Annual Grammy Awards.

== Background ==
In an interview with Billboard, Caesar said: "I met a girl and got very involved. She brought things and feelings out of me that I didn't know I had. 'Get You' is a song of praise to a love I didn't even feel I deserved at the time. Being with someone you truly adore and being present enough in the moment that the world literally slows down and you ask yourself how did I stumble into this? I'm always shooting myself in the foot, but I'm in here." Talking about his collaborator on the song, Kali Uchis, he said: "Kali is great and very sweet. There's no ego between us so it makes for great chemistry. We have very different backgrounds and have different world views and I think we perceive music differently because of that, but it blends well. It's lots of fun to work with Kali. We've only just started." Reflecting on the song, he told Essence: "I'm absent minded and daydream a lot. It just felt like the song was already there and I was just lucky enough to find it."

== Release and reception ==
"Get You" was released via Caesar's Golden Child Recordings on October 20, 2016, as the lead single from Caesar's debut studio album, Freudian (2017). It premiered on Billboard magazine and Beats 1.

Caesar played an acoustic version of it in a trailer of this documentary on Apple Music. A music video for the song was released on December 1, 2016. The song was nominated for Best R&B Performance at the 60th Annual Grammy Awards.

On August 16, 2017, Caesar made his late-night television debut by performing "Get You" live on The Late Late Show with James Corden, backed by a band and eight background vocalists. He also performed "We Find Love" alongside, as part of Apple Music's "Up Next" segment. Zane Lowe, who presented Caesar along with James Corden, said of the performance, "It's been amazing to witness Daniel Caesar's journey up to this point. He has one of the most exciting and tasteful voices in modern music."

At the time of its release, both the commercial and promotional version of the single of were backed by "Japanese Denim". The track was a sleeper hit, gaining popularity despite not appearing on Freudian; in February 2021, it was simultaneously certified by RIAA as a gold and platinum record.

In early 2023, the song was sent to rhythmic contemporary stations, reaching the top 20 of the radio charts in US.

== Track listing ==
Digital download
No.	Title	Producer(s)	Length
1.	"Get You" (featuring Kali Uchis)	Jordan Evans; Matthew Burnett; BADBADNOTGOOD	4:37
2.	"Japanese Denim"	Evans; Burnett	4:30
Total length:			9:07

== Personnel ==
Credits adapted from "Get You"/"Japanese Denim" radio sampler credits and YouTube.

- Daniel Caesar – songwriting
- Kali Uchis – additional vocals, songwriting ("Get You")
- Jordan Evans – production, engineering; drum programming, mixing ("Get You")
- Matthew Burnett – production, keys
- BADBADNOTGOOD – music; production ("Japanese Denim")
  - Chester Hansen – keys; bass ("Japanese Denim")
  - Alexander Sowinski – drums, drum programming
  - Matthew Tavares – engineering; mixing, additional production ("Get You")
- Ian Culley – guitars
- Wes Allen – bass ("Get You")
- Riley Bell – mixing, mastering

== Charts ==
Chart (2017–2018)	Peak position
US Billboard Hot 100	93
US Hot R&B/Hip-Hop Songs (Billboard)	41
US Adult R&B Songs (Billboard)	1
US Hot R&B Songs (Billboard)	5
Canada Emerging Artist (Billboard)	8

Chart (2025)	Peak position
Philippines (Philippines Hot 100)	34

== Certifications ==
=== "Get You" ===
Region	Certification	Certified units/sales
Canada (Music Canada)	4× Platinum	320,000^{‡}
Denmark (IFPI Danmark)	Gold	45,000^{‡}
New Zealand (RMNZ)	4× Platinum	120,000^{‡}
United Kingdom (BPI)	Platinum	600,000^{‡}
United States (RIAA)	7× Platinum	7,000,000^{‡}
^{‡} Sales+streaming figures based on certification alone.

=== "Japanese Denim" ===
Region	Certification	Certified units/sales
Canada (Music Canada)	2× Platinum	160,000^{‡}
United States (RIAA)	3× Platinum	3,000,000^{‡}
^{‡} Sales+streaming figures based on certification alone.
