= Brandy discography =

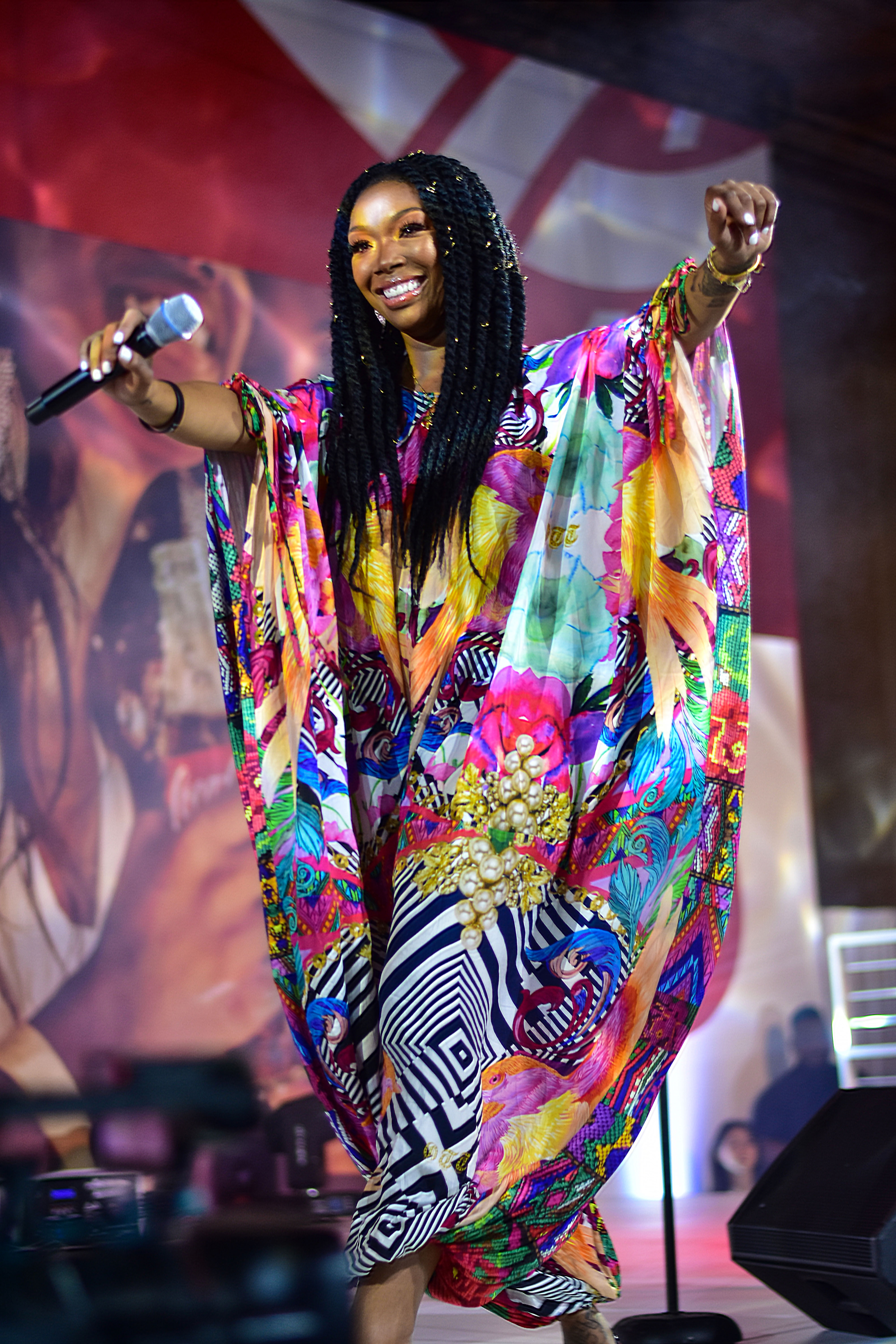
- Brandy performing in 2019
- Studio albums: 8
- Extended plays: 1
- Compilation albums: 1
- Singles: 51
- Album appearances: 47
- Soundtrack appearances: 28

American singer Brandy Norwood entered the music business as a backing vocalist for R&B boy bands such as Immature, prior to launching her own career in 1994. Her discography, as a solo artist, includes eight studio albums, one compilation album, one extended play, 51 singles, 47 album appearances and 28 soundtrack appearances. Norwood has sold over 10.5 million albums in the United States, and has won over 100 awards as a recording artist. In 1999, Billboard ranked Norwood among the top 20 of the Top Pop Artists of the 1990s.

Originally signed to Atlantic Records, Norwood's self-titled debut album, a collection of street-oriented R&B with a hip-hop edge, was released in September 1994, and produced the three top 10 singles "I Wanna Be Down", "Baby" and "Brokenhearted", of which two reached the top of the Hot R&B/Hip-Hop Songs chart and were certified gold and platinum, respectively. A fourth single released from the album, "Best Friend", became another top 10 hit on the US R&B chart. The following year, Norwood contributed songs to the soundtracks of the films Batman Forever (1995) and Waiting to Exhale (1995), with the single "Sittin' Up in My Room" becoming another top 10 success in the US and first top 30 entry in the United Kingdom. In 1996, she collaborated with Tamia, Chaka Khan and Gladys Knight on the single "Missing You", released from the Set It Off soundtrack, which became her major success in New Zealand, reaching number two.

Norwood's second album Never Say Never was released in 1998 and achieved international chart success, establishing her as one of the most successful of the new breed of R&B female vocalists to emerge during the mid-to late 1990s. It included the number-one singles "The Boy Is Mine", a duet with Monica, and "Have You Ever?". The album was certified five times platinum by the Recording Industry Association of America (RIAA), becoming Norwood's best-selling album to date with over 17 million records sold worldwide. Her third album Full Moon was released in 2002 and was certified platinum by the RIAA. It spawned the top 10 hit "What About Us?", alongside two other singles. Norwood's fourth album Afrodisiac was released in 2004 and was certified Gold. It also achieved international success, being certified Gold in Japan and other markets.

Following another hiatus and a label shift to Epic Records, her fifth album Human was released in December 2008. The album spawned two singles "Right Here (Departed)" and "Long Distance", of which both reached the top of the Billboard Hot Dance Club Play chart. Norwood's sixth album Two Eleven was released in October 2012 and debuted at number three on the US Billboard 200, and number one on the Top R&B/Hip-Hop Albums chart. Its lead single, "Put It Down", featuring Chris Brown and reached number three of the US Hot R&B/Hip-Hop Songs chart, becoming Norwood's 10th top 10 single on the chart and her first in a decade. A second single, "Wildest Dreams", was released in August 2012. In 2015, Norwood made guest appearances on numerous singles, including "Magic" with Mystery Skulls and "The Girl Is Mine" with 99 Souls. The latter song, a funky house mash-up of "The Boy Is Mine", marked her highest-charting single in a decade in Australia and the United Kingdom.

On July 31, 2020, Norwood released her seventh album, B7, preceded by the lead single "Baby Mama" featuring Chance The Rapper. The official second single, "Borderline", coincided with the album's release. In May 2021, Norwood collaborated with Disney on the single "Starting Now". In June 2022, Norwood announced her major label return after signing with Motown Records. Norwood's eighth album, Christmas with Brandy was released on November 10, 2023, with a preceding single, "Christmas Party for Two", released on November 3, 2023.

== Albums ==
=== Studio albums ===
List of albums, with selected chart positions, sales figures and certifications
Title	Album details	Peak chart positions										Certifications	Sales
Title	Album details	US	US R&B	AUS	CAN	FRA	GER	JPN	NL	SWI	UK	Certifications	Sales
Brandy	Released: September 27, 1994; Label: Atlantic (#82610); Format: LP, Cassette, CD	20	6	26	20	—	86	—	—	—	119	RIAA: 4× Platinum; MC: Gold; BPI: Silver	US: 2,100,000; UK: 60,000; World: 6,000,000
Never Say Never	Released: June 9, 1998; Label: Atlantic (#83039); Formats: LP, Cassette, CD	2	2	13	3	12	10	14	5	11	19	RIAA: 5× Platinum; ARIA: Platinum; MC: 4× Platinum; SNEP: Gold; RIAJ: Platinum; BPI: Platinum	US: 4,600,000 (Note: As of July 2012, Never Say Never has sold 4,600,000 copies in the US according to Nielsen SoundScan, with additional 665,000 copies sold at BMG Music Clubs. Nielsen SoundScan does not count albums sold through clubs like the BMG Music Service, which were significantly popular in the 1990s.); UK: 260,000; World: 16,000,000
Full Moon	Released: February 25, 2002; Label: Atlantic (#83493); Formats: LP, CD, digital download	2	1	13	8	12	8	15	23	7	9	RIAA: Platinum; MC: Gold; RIAJ: Gold; BPI: Gold	US: 1,100,000; UK: 148,000
Afrodisiac	Released: June 28, 2004; Label: Atlantic (#83633); Formats: LP, CD, digital download	3	4	53	34	57	44	10	45	26	32	RIAA: Gold; RIAJ: Gold; BPI: Silver	US: 416,000
Human	Released: December 5, 2008; Label: Knockout, Epic (#727271); Formats: CD, digital download	15	5	—	—	129	—	37	—	—	— (Note: Human did not enter the UK Albums Chart, but peaked at number 34 on the Official UK Hip Hop and R&B Albums Chart Top 40.)		US: 214,000
Two Eleven	Released: October 12, 2012; Label: Chameleon, RCA; Formats: CD, digital download	3	1	—	—	173	—	103	—	—	87		US: 186,000
B7	Released: July 31, 2020; Label: Brand Nu, Entertainment One; Formats: CD, vinyl, digital download	12	1	—	—	—	—	—	—	67	— (Note: B7 did not enter the UK Albums Chart, but peaked at number 2 on the Official UK Hip Hop and R&B Albums Chart Top 40.)		US: 25,200
Christmas with Brandy	Released: November 10, 2023; Label: Brand Nu, Motown; Formats: Vinyl, CD, digital download, streaming	— (Note: Christmas with Brandy did not enter the Billboard 200, but peaked at number 50 on the Top Current Album Sales chart.)	—	—	—	—	—	—	—	—	—		
"—" denotes a title that did not chart, or was not released in that territory.

=== Compilation albums ===
List of compilation albums, with selected chart positions
Title	Album details	Peak chart positions					Certifications
Title	Album details	US	US R&B	AUS	JPN	UK	Certifications
The Best of Brandy	Released: March 28, 2005; Label: Rhino Atlantic (#812274); Formats: CD, digital download	27	11	25	28	24	BPI: Gold

=== Live albums ===
Title	Album details	Peak chart positions						Certifications
Title	Album details	US	US R&B	FRA	GER	NL	SWI	Certifications
VH1 Divas 1999	Released: November 2, 1999; Label: Arista; Formats: Cassette, CD	90	78	42	60	41	14	RIAA: Gold

== Singles ==
=== As lead artist ===
List of singles, with selected chart positions
Title	Year	Peak chart positions										Certifications	Album
Title	Year	US	US R&B	AUS	CAN	FRA	GER	NL	NZ	SWI	UK	Certifications	Album
"I Wanna Be Down"	1994	6	1	12	—	—	—	—	11	—	36	RIAA: Platinum; RMNZ: Platinum	Brandy
"Baby"	1994	4	1	16	68	—	—	—	4	—	174	RIAA: Platinum	Brandy
"Best Friend"	1995	34	7	—	—	—	—	—	11	—	—		Brandy
"Brokenhearted" (solo or featuring Wanya Morris of Boyz II Men)	1995	9	2	—	—	—	—	—	6	—	—	RIAA: Gold	Brandy
"Sittin' Up in My Room"	1996	2	2	99	31	—	—	— (Note: "Sittin' Up in My Room" did not enter the main Dutch singles chart but peaked at number 14 on the Single Top 100 Tipparade.)	6	—	30	RIAA: Platinum	Waiting to Exhale: Original Soundtrack Album
"Missing You" (with Tamia, Gladys Knight and Chaka Khan)	1996	25	10	—	35	—	—	—	2	—	—	RMNZ: Platinum	Set It Off: Music From the New Line Cinema Motion Picture
"The Boy Is Mine" (with Monica)	1998	1	1	3	1	2	5	1	1	3	2	RIAA: 2× Platinum; ARIA: Platinum; SNEP: Platinum; BVMI: Gold; RMNZ: 2× Platinum; IFPI SWI: Gold; BPI: Platinum	Never Say Never
"Top of the World" (featuring Mase)	1998	—	—	39	22	39	42	52	11	42	2	BPI: Silver	Never Say Never
"Have You Ever?"	1998	1	2	8	13	85	58	23	1	—	13	ARIA: Platinum; RMNZ: Platinum	Never Say Never
"Almost Doesn't Count"	1999	16	16	—	34	—	88	—	13	—	15		Never Say Never
"U Don't Know Me (Like U Used To)"	1999	79	25	—	—	—	—	—	—	—	180		Never Say Never
"(Everything I Do) I Do It for You"	1999	—	—	65	—	—	—	—	28	—	—		Never Say Never
"Another Day in Paradise" (with Ray J)	2001	—	—	11	—	11	2	6	29	3	5	ARIA: Gold; SNEP: Silver; BVMI: Gold; IFPI SWI: Gold; BPI: Silver	Urban Renewal and Full Moon
"What About Us?"	2002	7	3	6	16	24	13	11	8	8	4	ARIA: Gold	Full Moon
"Full Moon"	2002	18	16	43	—	27	54	51	—	72	15		Full Moon
"He Is"	2002	—	72	—	—	—	—	—	—	—	—		Full Moon
"Talk About Our Love" (featuring Kanye West)	2004	36	16	28	—	—	89	25	—	42	6		Afrodisiac
"Who Is She 2 U"	2004	85	43	99	—	—	— (Note: "Who Is She 2 U" did not enter the main German singles chart but peaked at number 7 on the Deutsche Urban Charts.)	— (Note: "Who Is She 2 U" did not enter the main Dutch singles chart but peaked at number 61 on the Urban Top 100.)	—	—	50		Afrodisiac
"Afrodisiac"	2004	—	—	31	—	25	— (Note: "Afrodisiac" did not enter the main German singles chart but peaked at number 1 on the Deutsche Urban Charts.)	—	—	36	11		Afrodisiac
"Right Here (Departed)"	2008	34	22	—	39	7	39	—	—	54	—		Human
"Long Distance"	2008	— (Note: "Long Distance" did not enter the Billboard Hot 100, but peaked at number 24 on the Bubbling Under Hot 100 chart.)	38	—	—	—	—	—	—	—	—		Human
"Talk to Me" (with Ray J and Willie Norwood)	2010	—	— (Note: "Talk to Me" did not enter the Hot R&B/Hip-Hop Songs, but peaked at number 37 on the Adult R&B Songs chart.)	—	—	—	—	—	—	—	—		A Family Business (soundtrack)
"It All Belongs to Me" (with Monica)	2012	—	23	—	—	—	—	— (Note: "It All Belongs to Me" did not enter the main Netherlands singles chart but peaked at number 84 on the Urban Top 100.)	—	—	—		New Life
"Put It Down" (featuring Chris Brown)	2012	65	3	—	—	—	— (Note: "Put It Down" did not enter the main German singles chart, but peaked at number 5 on the Deutsche Urban Charts.)	— (Note: "Put It Down" did not enter the main Netherlands singles chart but peaked at number 17 on the Urban Top 100.)	—	—	—		Two Eleven
"Wildest Dreams"	2012	—	68	—	—	—	—	—	—	—	—		Two Eleven
"Beggin & Pleadin"	2016	—	— (Note: "Beggin & Pleadin" did not enter the Hot R&B/Hip-Hop Songs, but peaked at number 17 on the R&B Digital Songs chart.)	—	—	—	—	—	—	—	—		Non-album single
"Love Again" (with Daniel Caesar)	2019	— (Note: "Love Again" did not enter the Billboard Hot 100, but peaked at number 24 on the Bubbling Under Hot 100 chart.)	— (Note: "Love Again" did not enter the Hot R&B/Hip-Hop Songs, but peaked at number 1 for two weeks on the Adult R&B Airplay chart.)	—	95	—	—	—	— (Note: "Love Again" did not enter the main New Zealand singles chart but peaked at number 15 on the New Zealand Hot Singles Chart.)	—	—	RIAA: Gold; MC: Gold	B7
"Freedom Rings"	2019	—	— (Note: "Freedom Rings" did not enter the Hot R&B/Hip-Hop Songs, but peaked at number 7 on the R&B Digital Songs chart.)	—	—	—	—	—	—	—	—		Non-album single
"Baby Mama" (featuring Chance the Rapper)	2020	—	— (Note: "Baby Mama" did not enter the Hot R&B/Hip-Hop Songs, but peaked at number 7 on the Adult R&B Songs chart.)	—	—	—	— (Note: "Baby Mama" did not enter the main German singles chart but peaked at number 9 on the Deutsche Urban Charts.)	—	—	—	—		B7
"Borderline"	2020	—	— (Note: "Borderline" did not enter the Hot R&B/Hip-Hop Songs, but peaked at number 7 on the Adult R&B Songs chart.)	—	—	—	—	—	—	—	—		B7
"No Tomorrow, Pt. 2" (featuring Ty Dolla Sign)	2020	—	—	—	—	—	—	—	—	—	—		Non-album singles
"Starting Now"	2021	—	—	—	—	—	—	—	—	—	—		Non-album singles
"Christmas Party for Two"	2023	—	—	—	—	—	—	—	—	—	—		Christmas with Brandy
"The Boy Is Mine" (remix) (with Ariana Grande and Monica)	2024	— (Note: "The Boy Is Mine (Remix)" did not enter the US Billboard Hot 100 chart, but peaked at number 21 on the US Digital Song Sales chart.)	—	—	—	—	—	—	40	—	—		Eternal Sunshine (Slightly Deluxe and Also Live)
"Intention" (with Ty Dolla $ign)	2026	—	—	—	—	—	—	—	—	—	—		Girl Music vol. 1
"A Different World"	2026	—	—	—	—	—	—	—	—	—	—		A Different World
"Hit the Road Jack" (with Pynk Beard)	2026	—	—	—	—	—	—	—	—	—	—		By Any Means: The Album
"My Best Friend" (with Matt Sassari & Giacobbi)	2026	—	—	—	—	—	—	—	—	—	—		Non-album single
"—" denotes a title that did not chart, or was not released in that territory.

=== As featured artist ===
Title	Year	Peak chart positions									Certifications	Album
Title	Year	US	US R&B	AUS	CAN	IRE	NL	NZ	SWE	UK	Certifications	Album
"Wake Up Everybody" (with Various Artists)	2004	—	—	—	—	—	—	—	—	—		Non-album singles
"We Are the World 25 for Haiti" (with Artists for Haiti)	2010	2	—	18	8	9	—	8	5	50		Non-album singles
"Magic" (Mystery Skulls featuring Nile Rodgers and Brandy)	2015	—	—	—	—	—	—	—	—	—		Forever
"The Girl Is Mine" (99 Souls featuring Destiny's Child and Brandy)	2015	— (Note: "The Girl Is Mine" did not enter the US Billboard Hot 100 but peaked at number 1 on the Billboard Dance Club Songs)	—	33	—	8	—	—	—	5	ARIA: Gold; BPI: 2× Platinum	Non-album single
"Optimistic" (August Greene featuring Brandy)	2018	—	—	—	—	—	—	—	—	—		August Greene
"I Could Be Wrong" (Lucas & Steve with Brandy)	2018	—	—	—	—	—	55	—	—	—		Non-album singles
"Right on Time" (Ray J featuring Designer Doubt, Brandy and Flo Rida)	2018	—	—	—	—	—	—	—	—	—		Non-album singles
"Sleep" (Camper featuring Brandy)	2020	—	—	—	—	—	—	—	—	—		Non-album singles
"Somebody's Son" (Tiwa Savage featuring Brandy)	2021	—	— (Note: "Somebody's Son" did not enter the US R&B chart, but peaked at number 20 on the Billboard's Adult R&B Airplay chart.)	—	—	—	—	—	—	— (Note: "Somebody's Son" did not enter the UK Top 100 Singles chart, but peaked at number 6 on the UK Afrobeats Top 20 chart.)		Water & Garri
"Say It" (Remix) (Josh Levi featuring Brandy)	2026	—	—	—	—	—	—	—	—	—		Non-album single
"—" denotes a title that did not chart, or was not released in that territory.

=== Promotional singles ===
List of promotional singles, with selected chart positions, showing year released and originating album
Title	Year	Peak chart positions		Album
Title	Year	US	US R&B	Album
"Angel in Disguise"	1998	72	17	Never Say Never
"Never Say Never"	2000	—	—	Never Say Never
"Rather Be"	2022	—	—	B7

== Other charted songs ==
List of non-single charting songs, with selected chart positions
Title	Year	Peak chart positions							Album
Title	Year	US	US R&B/HH Air.	US Rap Dig.	US Gospel Dig.	US Jazz Dig.	GER Urban	KOR (Int.)	Album
"Rock with You" (Quincy Jones featuring Brandy and Heavy D)	1996	—	74	—	—	—	—	—	Q's Jook Joint
"Turn It Up"	2003	—	—	—	—	—	2	—	Afrodisiac
"Scared of Beautiful"	2012	—	—	—	—	—	—	48	Two Eleven
"Do You Know What You Have"	2012	—	61	—	—	—	—	—	Two Eleven
"Wish Your Love Away"	2012	—	66	—	—	—	—	—	Two Eleven
"What Are We Doing" (Robert Glasper featuring Brandy)	2013	—	—	—	—	15	—	—	Black Radio 2
"God on My Mind" (The Walls Group featuring Brandy)	2014	—	—	—	23	—	—	—	Fast Forward
"LA" (Ty Dolla Sign featuring Kendrick Lamar, Brandy and James Fauntleroy)	2015	—	—	38	—	—	—	—	Free TC
"I Need You" (Kehlani featuring Brandy)	2026	— (Note: "I Need You" did not enter the Billboard Hot 100, but peaked at number 4 on the Bubbling Under Hot 100 chart.)	—	—	—	—	—	—	Kehlani

== Album appearances ==
List of album appearances by Brandy
Title	Year	Other artist(s)	Album
"Jook Joint Intro"	1995	Quincy Jones	Q's Jook Joint
"Rock with You"	1995	Quincy Jones, Heavy D	Q's Jook Joint
"Stuff like That"	1995	Quincy Jones, Charlie Wilson, Ray Charles, Chaka Khan, Ashford & Simpson	Q's Jook Joint
"Brokenhearted (Soulpower Groove Mix)"	1995	Wanya Morris of Boyz II Men	The Remix Collection
"Thank You"	1997	Ray J	Everything You Want
"(Everything I Do) I Do It for You"	1999	Faith Hill	VH1 Divas Live 1999
"Have You Ever?"/"Almost Doesn't Count"	1999	—N/a	VH1 Divas Live 1999
"I'm Every Woman	1999	Whitney Houston, Chaka Khan, Faith Hill, Mary J. Blige, LeAnn Rimes	VH1 Divas Live 1999
"Love Is All That Matters"	1999	Diana Ross	Every Day Is a New Day
"A Love Shared"	2001	Willie Norwood, Kirk Whalum	Bout It
"Top of the World (Remix), Part II"	2001	Big Pun, Fat Joe	Endangered Species
"N 2 Da Music"	2003	Timbaland & Magoo	Under Construction, Part II
"Fall Back"	2003	Lloyd Banks, Fabolous	Mo Money in the Bank, Part 2
"Bring Me Down"	2005	Kanye West	Late Registration
"War Is Over"	2005	Ray J	Raydiation
"Thought You Said"	2006	Diddy	Press Play
"Somethin' Bout You"	2007	Carl Thomas	So Much Better
"Please Come to Boston"	2007	Babyface	Playlist
"Quickly"	2008	John Legend	Evolver
"Bridge to Love"	2009	Ginuwine	A Man's Thoughts
"Meet in tha Middle"	2009	Timbaland	Shock Value II
"Symphony"	2009	Timbaland, Attitude	Shock Value II
"Special"	2009	Snoop Dogg, Pharrell Williams	Malice n Wonderland
"Tell Me"	2009	Sho	Sho & Tell (Thug & A Gentleman)
"Family Business"	2011	Ray J, Willie Norwood, Sonja Norwood	A Family Business
"Talk to Me"	2011	Ray J, Willie Norwood	A Family Business
"Lifeguard"	2011	—N/a	A Family Business
"I Don't Care"	2011	—N/a	A Family Business
"Conquer the World"	2013	Jessie J	Alive
"What Are We Doing"	2013	Robert Glasper	Black Radio 2
"God On My Mind"	2014	The Walls Group	Fast Forward
"Do Better"	2014	Chris Brown	X
"Number 1"	2014	Mystery Skulls, Nile Rodgers	Forever
"Magic"	2014	Mystery Skulls, Nile Rodgers	Forever
"The Rest of Our Lives"	2015	Tyrese	Black Rose
"Silent Night"	2015	India Arie, Joe Sample	Christmas with Friends
"LA"	2015	Ty Dolla Sign, Kendrick Lamar	Free TC
"Deliver Me"	2017	Sir the Baptist	Saint or Sinner
"Ascension"	2017	Jhené Aiko	Trip
"Lullaby"	2018	Todrick Hall	Forbidden
"Smack On God"	2018	Lil Keed	Keed Talk To 'Em
"Jet Black"	2019	Anderson Paak	Ventura
"Love Again"	2019	Daniel Caesar	Case Study 01
"Even More"	2019	MAJOR.	Non-album single
"Plan B"	2020	Ro James	Mantic
"Dynamite"	2021	Gallant	Neptune
"Click Clack"	2021	Todrick Hall	Femuline
"The Wave"	2021	Amorphous, James Fauntleroy	Things Take Shape
"Euphoric"	2021	Eric Bellinger	New Light
"F.A.I.T.H.F.U.L."	2022	Nick Cannon	The Explicit Tape: Raw & B
"The Roof (When I Feel the Need)"	2022	Mariah Carey	Butterfly: 25th Anniversary Expanded Edition
"Folded" (Remix)	2025	Kehlani	Folded Homage Pack
"Back and Forth"	2026	Camper	Campilation
"I Need You"	2026	Kehlani	Kehlani

== Soundtrack appearances ==
List of soundtrack appearances by Brandy
Title	Year	Other artist(s)	Film/Series
"Where Are You Now?"	1995	—N/a	Batman Forever
"Sitting Up in My Room"	1995	—N/a	Waiting to Exhale
"Missing You"	1996	(with Tamia, Gladys Knight and Chaka Khan)	Set It Off (soundtrack)
"Baby"	1996	—N/a	All That
"Moesha Theme Song"	1996	—N/a	Moesha
"A Lovely Night"	1997	Bernadette Peters, Veanne Cox, Natalie Desselle-Reid	Cinderella
"Do I Love You Because You're Beautiful"	1997	Paolo Montalban	Cinderella
"Impossible"	1997	Whitney Houston	Cinderella
"In My Own Little Corner"	1997	—N/a	Cinderella
"It's Possible"	1997	Whitney Houston	Cinderella
"Ten Minutes Ago"	1997	Paolo Montalban	Cinderella
"The Sweetest Sounds"	1997	Paolo Montalban	Cinderella
"Almost Doesn't Count"	1999	—N/a	Double Platinum
"Happy"	1999	—N/a	Double Platinum
"Have You Ever?"	1999	—N/a	Double Platinum
"Love Is All That Matters"	1999	Diana Ross	Double Platinum
"Open"	2001	—N/a	Osmosis Jones
"Dance with Us"	2002	Diddy featuring Bow Wow	The Wild Thornberrys Movie
"Beginning Together"	2005	—N/a	Sesame Beginnings: Beginning Together
"Dig This"	2008	—N/a	Meet the Browns
"A Love Shared"	2011	Willie Norwood, Kirk Whalum	Fathers of the Sport
"Ohhh Lord"	2018	Queen Latifah, Patti LaBelle	Star
"All I Need"	2018	—N/a	Star (Season 3)
"Spotlight"	2018	Queen Latifah	Star (Season 3)
"Family Affair"	2019	Queen Latifah, Brittany O'Grady, Patti LaBelle, Ryan Destiny, and Miss Lawrence	Star (Season 3)
"Only God Knows"	2019	Queen Latifah	Star (Season 3)
"Nasty Girl"	2021	Eve, Naturi Naughton, Nadine Velazquez	Queens
"The Introduction"	2021	Eve, Naturi Naughton, Nadine Velazquez	Queens
"Belly of the Bitch"	2021	Eve, Naturi Naughton, Nadine Velazquez	Queens
"Heart of Queens"	2021	Eve, Naturi Naughton, Nadine Velazquez	Queens
"Girls Gonna Run That"	2021	Eve, Naturi Naughton, Nadine Velazquez	Queens
"All Rise (The Supreme Court)"	2021	Eve, Naturi Naughton, Nadine Velazquez	Queens
"Hear Me"	2021	—N/a	Queens
"Wrecking Ball"	2021	—N/a	Queens
"Ain't No Sunshine"	2021	—N/a	Queens
"Until My Final Breath"	2021	—N/a	Queens
"Lady Z Strikes Back (Can't Stop You)"	2022	Remy Ma	Queens
"Tomorrow's Another Day"	2022	—N/a	Queens
"Nothing Without You"	2022	Sy'rai	Cheaper by the Dozen
"Love Ain't It"	2024	Rita Ora, Kylie Cantrall, Malia Baker	Descendants: The Rise of Red soundtrack
"So This Is Love"	2024	Paolo Montalban	Descendants: The Rise of Red soundtrack
"A Different World"	2026	—N/a	A Different World

== See also ==
- Brandy videography
- List of songs recorded by Brandy
