= Brandy videography =

Videography about Brandy Norwood

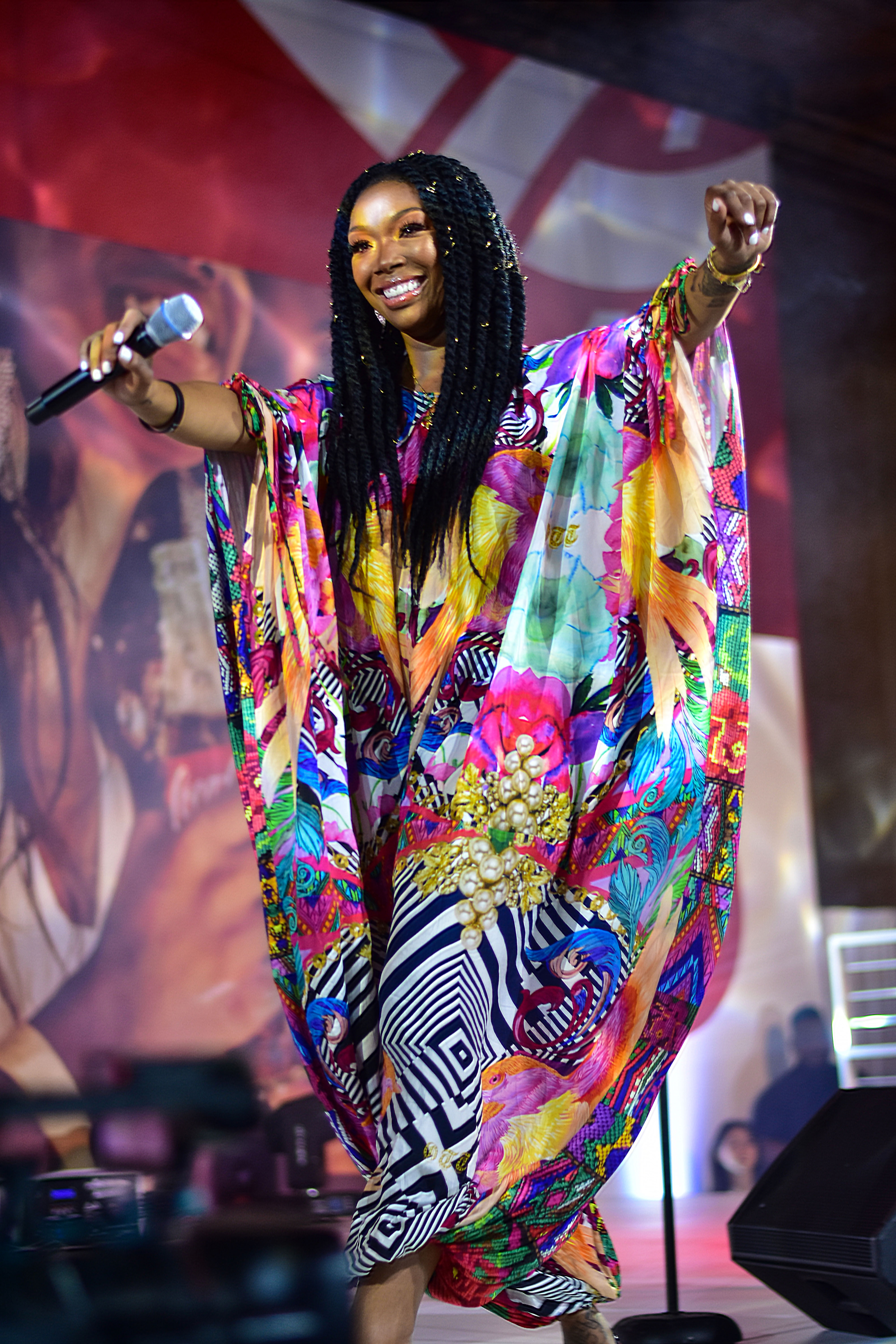
Brandy in 2019

Brandy Norwood, an American singer, songwriter and actress, has released various music videos. She first appeared in the music video for her debut single "I Wanna Be Down (1994). The Keith Ward-directed clip won the Billboard Music Award for Best New Clip, R&B/Urban. A second version, shot alongside female rappers MC Lyte, Queen Latifah, and Yo-Yo for the Human Rhythm Hip Hop Remix of "I Wanna Be Down", earned Norwood her first MTV Video Music Award nomination in the Best Rap Video at the 1995 ceremony, and received Billboard Music Award and Billboard Music Video Award nods. Norwood's video for follow-up "Baby", a collaboration with director Hype Williams, garnered a Best Choreography nomination at the 1995 MTV Video Music Awards. Other videos from the album included for the singles "Best Friend", and "Brokenhearted".

In 1995, Norwood contributed the song "Sittin' Up in My Room" to the soundtrack of the film Waiting to Exhale (1995). Its accompanying video was nominated for Best Video from a Film at the 1996 MTV Awards. Her second album Never Say Never (1998), was preceded by the music video for "The Boy Is Mine" with fellow R&B singer Monica, which was nominated for several awards, including two MTV Video Music Awards for including Video of the Year and Best R&B Video. The video for single "Have You Ever?", directed by Kevin Bray, received another Best R&B Video nomination at the 1999 MTV Video Music Awards. Never Say Never produced several more music videos, including visuals for "Top of the World", and "Almost Doesn't Count", as well as "U Don't Know Me (Like U Used To)" and its remix with female rappers Shaunta and Da Brat.

In 2002, the highly animated, futuristic Dave Meyers-directed video for "What About Us?", the lead single from Norwood's third album Full Moon (2002), was nominated for the Viewer's Choice Award. Filmed several weeks before the birth of her daughter Sy'rai, a heavily pregnant Norwood produced one more clip from Full Moon for its title track. The release of Norwood's fourth album Afrodisiac (2004) was preceded by the music video for the single "Talk About Our Love". Norwood re-teamed with director Dave Meyers to work on the visuals which earned her another Best R&B Video at the MTV Video Music Awards. Directors Jake Nava and Matthew Rolston were consulted to work with Norwood on the videos for the singles "Who Is She 2 U" and "Afrodisiac".

== Music videos ==
=== 1990s ===
Year	Title	Director(s)	Description	Ref(s)
1994	"I Wanna Be Down"	Keith Ward	The video portrays Norwood in her tomboy image, dancing in front of a jeep near a forest, flanked by several dancers.	
1994	"I Wanna Be Down"	Hype Williams	An in-studio video featuring Norwood singing along with MC Lyte, Queen Latifah, and Yo-Yo against black and white backgrounds.	
1995	"Baby"	Hype Williams	The video portrays Norwood and her company dancing at the New York Times Square, wearing skiing outfits.	
1995	"Best Friend"	Matthew Rolston	A partially black and white, partially colored video featuring Brandy and her backup troupe displaying their hip hop dancing skills in front of a garage.	
1995	"Brokenhearted"	Hype Williams	Norwood dreams about doing a duet with Wanya Morris on various settings of an empty mansion.	
1995	"Sittin' Up in My Room"	Hype Williams	Norwood is swimming in thoughts of a guy, keeping herself penned up in a trippy retro, cartoonish room after her friend told her that her love interest is joining the party, which is going on downstairs.	
1996	"Missing You"	F. Gary Gray	Norwood, Tamia, Chaka Khan and Gladys Knight performing in different landscapes each. The video includes scenes from the 1996 film Set It Off for whose soundtrack the track was recorded.	
1998	"The Boy Is Mine"	Joseph Kahn	Norwood and Monica portray both neighbours and challengers, fighting over the same boy, only to end up as allies who amicably settle on dumping their unfaithful lover, played by Mekhi Phifer.	
1998	"Top of the World"	Paul Hunter	A surrealistic clip built on digital effects, the video features different sequences of Norwood floating in the air, flipping and balancing vertically and horizontally alongside New York City skyscrapers and other buildings.	
1998	"Have You Ever?"	Kevin Bray	Norwood looks after her best friend's empty house, waiting for his return while watching videos of the two of them.	
1999	"Almost Doesn't Count"	Kevin Bray	The video depicts Norwood as a wedding guest and singer whose oldtimer suffers from a breakdown in the middle of Mojave Desert prior to the wedding ceremony in the evening. An alternative cut was later included on the home release of Double Platinum.	
1999	"U Don't Know Me (Like U Used To)"	Martin Weisz	A Matrix-themed clip, the video begins with people walking in front of a building and later on a sidewalk. They pause periodically and speed up as Norwood sings.	
1999	"U Don't Know Me (Like U Used To)" (remix)	Martin Weisz	The music video features Norwood and rappers Shaunta, and Da Brat singing as people walk by on a pedestrian walk.	

=== 2000s ===
Year	Title	Director(s)	Description	Ref(s)
2000	"(Everything I Do) I Do It for You"	Unknown	The video features Norwood as she is singing on a darkened stage under purplish lights, using clips from her Never Say Never World Tour. A compilation of video clips from her music videos play throughout.	
2001	"Another Day In Paradise"	Nick Quested, Gil Green	The video follows a homeless woman wandering the streets being chastised by various people, including a waitress, a businessman, and a police officer. The video is intercut with scenes of Norwood and Ray J who follow the woman and taking photographs of each incident with a camera. A version of the video with the Stargate Remix was also released.	
2002	"What About Us?"	Dave Meyers	Entirely shot in front of a greenscreen, the video features Brandy in a highly digitalized, futurtistic environment, where enslaved men are treated as objects such as providing the foundation of a human pyramid. It concludes with her sitting in the passenger's seat in a lowrider, amid a sea of lowriders, next to brother Ray J.	
2002	"Full Moon"	Chris Robinson	While stargazing through a telescope on her Los Angeles balcony at full moon, Brandy turns her attention to a house party where she catches the eye of a longhaired male. As the video progresses, she decides to crash the shindig in hopes of meeting him. A version of the video with the Cutfather & Joe Remix was also released. Norwood was nearly six months pregnant at the time of the shoot.	
2004	"Talk About Our Love"	Dave Meyers	Based on a treatment by producer Kanye West, the video portrays Brandy and West as a couple who is frequently disturbed by nosy friends and neighbours, who keep on popping in and out of their house to find out about their affairs.	
2004	"Who Is She 2 U"	Jake Nava	Brandy plays an all-knowing narrator, who gives the central male character pause with her wicked glances that let him know she's watching his every move throughout Los Angeles. She follows him from a bus to a construction site to a barbershop to a bus stop, all the while catching him in the act with various women, sometimes before his girlfriend does.	
2004	"Afrodisiac"	Matthew Rolston	A simple dance video, set in a water-flooded outtrack world where the sung-about afrodisiac is visualized in various forms of liquid.	
2004	"Wake Up Everybody"	Mark Young	Compilation video of Brandy, Mary J. Blige, Missy Elliott, Eve, Ashanti, Wyclef Jean, Monica, Fabolous, Akon, Jamie Foxx, Babyface, and many more recording their vocals in the booth.	
2008	"Right Here (Departed)"	Little X	The concept of the video depicts Brandy as an angel, who is crossing over to the other side and coming back into her family and friend's lives, comforting them just with her singing. The art direction for the video was loosely inspired by the 2007 science-fiction film I Am Legend.	
2008	"Long Distance"	Chris Robinson	Black-and-white video depicting Brandy a singer who deals with the circumstances of a long-distance relationship. Towards the end of the video, it changes to color as it starts to rain.	

=== 2010s ===
Year	Title	Director(s)	Description	Ref(s)
2010	"We Are the World 25"	Paul Haggis	Compilation video of Brandy, Mary J. Blige, Wyclef Jean, Akon, Jennifer Hudson, Janet Jackson, Enrique Iglesias, and many more recording their vocals in the booth.	
2012	"It All Belongs to Me"	Chris Robinson	Inspired by the films Thelma & Louise (1991) and Waiting to Exhale (1995), the music video portrays Brandy and Monica in dysfunctional relationships and helping in both situations.	
2012	"Put It Down"	Hype Williams	The video features interactions with Brown, as well as scenes including Norwood dancing in front of both blue-lit industrial backdrops and artful Jackson Pollock-esque green screens.	
2012	"Wildest Dreams"	Matthew Rolston	A stylized performance video, "Wildest Dreams" features Norwood performing the song onstage in front of cheering fans inside a warehouse, flanked by three back-up singers. Intercut with black-and-white solo shots, Norwood wears skimp blue-jean shorts with red boots in the visuals.	
2015	"Magic"	Double Ninja	A gold-dipped CGI-clip, inspired by the ceremony scene in American film director Stanley Kubrick's final film, the erotic thriller Eyes Wide Shut (1999), the video tells a tale of love and creation.	
2015	"The Girl Is Mine"	Sandl	The video features a man travelling backwards and forwards in time.	
2016	"Beggin & Pleadin"	Mike Ho	Inspired by the coming-of-age period drama film The Color Purple (1985), Norwood, wearing a sparkly fire-red dress with sequined embellishments, plays a Shug Avery-inspired blues singer and protagonist in a Harlem-themed club. Shot in Los Angeles, the video features cameo appearances by Ray J, Princess Love, and girl group Glamor.	
2018	"Optimistic"	Brian "B+" Cross	The video plays with the concept of optimism in several literal ways, with viewers being introduced to people of the Jackson, Mississippi community through images of children playing, a woman tending crops, teenagers hanging out, and people wrapped in the African American flag. Images are intertwined with shots of the four musicians recording in a dark studio lit.	
2018	"Lullaby"	Todrick Hall	Released as part of Hall's visual album Forbidden (2018) that was accompanied by a ninety-one-minute film, which tells the story of the life of Nolan Renner. In the excerpt, Norwood is portrayed singing "Lullaby" for her baby boy Nolan, who is forcefully taken from her and given up for adoption.	
2018	"All I Need"	N/A	Released as part of Star show.	

=== 2020s ===
Year	Title	Director(s)	Description	Ref(s)
2020	"Baby Mama"	Derek Blanks, Frank Gatson Jr.	Inspired by the 1969 musical film Sweet Charity and Fosse-style choreography, the video features Norwood and several dancers performing under bright colors inside a warehouse. Norwood and Chance the Rapper interact throughout the video.	
2020	"Borderline"	Derek Blanks, Frank Gatson Jr.	The video sees Norwood performing "Borderline" in a nightclub, intercut by scenes in which she is forced into a padded room and straight-jacket. The clip ends with a message showing support for all who need assistance in the US with regards to mental health issues. Norwood's nightclub scenes were inspired by Diana Ross's portrayal of Billie Holiday in Lady Sings the Blues.	
2021	"Cinderella Medley by Todrick - Starring Brandy"	Todrick Hall	Todrick begins singing "The Sweetest Sounds" and is joined by Brandy to begin singing a medley of songs from Cinderella including "In My Own Little Corner" and "Impossible". The ballroom scene shows Brandy wearing a replica of her blue dress, crown and necklace from the film singing "A Lovely Night" and "Ten Minutes Ago".	
2021	"Dynamite"	Bennett Johnson	Gallant and Brandy unite atop of a Los Angeles skyscraper, with their backs resting on each other, singing fearlessly amid catastrophic circumstances when a thunderstorm rages on over the city after a volcano explodes in the distance.	
2021	"Starting Now"	—N/a	Dressed in a white ball gown, Brandy is seen walking gracefully through the South Coast Botanic Garden. Intercut are sequences of young people who aspire to realize their individual dreams as well as flashbacks of a young Brandy and scenes from several Disney films.	
2021	"Nasty Girl"	Tim Story	Along with Eve, Naturi Naughton and Nadine Velazquez as their characters of the TV series Queens	
2021	"Somebody's Son"	Meja Alabi	The video starts with Tiwa Savage, dressed on gold, striking commanding poses, while Brandy gets her flowing hair braided by Savage. The two later assemble again for a joint scene where they share glamour and performance shots.	
2023	"Christmas Party for Two"	William Sikora		

== See also ==
- Brandy Norwood discography
- List of Brandy Norwood songs
