= Kimberly "Kaydence" Krysiuk =

American songwriter

Background information
- Genres: Pop; R&B; hip-hop
- Labels: BMG; Roc Nation

Kimberly "Kaydence" Krysiuk is an American songwriter based in Florida, United States, formerly of Connecticut. She has written hit songs for Beyoncé, Ariana Grande, Alina Baraz, Daniel Caesar, H.E.R, Brandy, and more.

Kaydence's works have been nominated for several awards. At the 62nd Annual Grammy Awards, her works were nominated for Record of the Year (Ariana Grande - "7 Rings"), Album of the Year (Ariana Grande - Thank U, Next and H.E.R - I Used to Know Her), and Best R&B Performance (Daniel Caesar feat. Brandy - "Love Again"). She won "Best Pop Vocal Album" for Ariana Grande's Sweetener, and won Best R&B Performance for Beyoncé Black Parade.

At the 2020 BMI Pop Awards, she was recognized for Songwriter of the Most-Performed Songs of the Year ("7 Rings", "Thank U, Next").

== Discography ==
| Artist | Year | Title | Album |
|---|---|---|---|
| Trey Songz | 2025 | "History" | History |
| Mary J. Blige | 2024 | "I Got Plans" Feat. Ferg | Gratitude |
| Mary J. Blige | 2024 | "Never Give Up On Me" | Gratitude |
| Jennifer Lopez | 2024 | "Greatest Love Story Never Told" | This is Me...Now |
| Jennifer Lopez | 2024 | "Hummingbird" | This is Me...Now |
| Jennifer Lopez | 2024 | "This is Me...Now" | This is Me...Now |
| 6LACK | 2023 | "Spirited Away" | Since I Have a Lover |
| 6LACK | 2023 | "Mean It" | Homicide |
| 6LACK | 2021 | "Rent Free" | Since I Have a Lover Rent Free/By Any Means |
| Leon Bridges | 2021 | "Why Don't You Touch Me" | Gold-Diggers Sound |
| Katlyn Nichol | 2021 | "Liar" | Liar |
| ZAYN | 2021 | "Unfuckwitable" | Nobody is Listening |
| Alina Baraz | 2020 | "Until I Met You" (feat. Nas) | It Was Divine |
| Beyoncé | 2020 | "Black Parade" | The Lion King: The Gift (Deluxe) |
| Brandy | 2020 | "Baby Mama" (feat. Chance The Rapper) | B7 |
| Brandy | 2020 | "Borderline" | B7 |
| Brandy | 2020 | "High Heels" | B7 |
| Brandy | 2020 | "Unconditional Oceans" | B7 |
| Brandy | 2020 | "All My Life pt. 1, 2 & 3" | B7 |
| Brandy | 2020 | "Lucid Dreams" | B7 |
| Brandy | 2020 | "All My Life" | B7 |
| Brandy | 2020 | "Bye BiPolar" | B7 |
| Timbaland | 2020 | "Dumb Thingz" (feat. Kaydence) | Beat Saber |
| Daniel Caesar & Brandy | 2019 | "Love Again" | Case Study 01 and B7 |
| H.E.R. | 2019 | "Something Keeps Pulling Me Back" | I Used To Know Her |
| Tiwa Savage & Mr. Eazi | 2019 | "Keys to the Kingdom" | The Lion King: The Gift |
| Jennifer Lopez | 2019 | "Medicine" (feat. French Montana) | Medicine |
| Ariana Grande | 2019 | "7 Rings" | Thank U, Next |
| Ariana Grande | 2018 | "Thank U, Next" | Thank U, Next |
| Ariana Grande | 2018 | "Better Off" | Sweetener |
| Cassie | 2017 | "Don't Play it Safe" (feat. KAYTRANADA) | Don't Play it Safe |
