= No Tomorrow =

No Tomorrow may refer to:

== Film and TV ==
- No Tomorrow (1957 film), a Swedish film directed by Arne Mattsson
- No Tomorrow (2016 film), a South Korean film
- No Tomorrow (TV series), an American romantic fantasy dramedy series
- "No Tomorrow" (How I Met Your Mother), a 2008 episode of How I Met Your Mother

== Literature ==
- Killing Eve: No Tomorrow, a 2019 spy thriller novel by Luke Jennings

== Music ==
- "No Tomorrow" (Orson song), 2006
- "No Tomorrow" (Brandy song), 2020
- "No Tomorrow", by Gotthard from Human Zoo
- "No Tomorrow", by Suede from Night Thoughts
- "No Tomorrow", by Dark Angel from We Have Arrived

== See also ==
- "Not Tomorrow", by Living Colour from The Chair in the Doorway
- "Not Tomorrow Yet", a 2016 episode of The Walking Dead
