= Nothing Without You =

Nothing Without You may refer to:

== Albums ==
- Nothing Without You (Mel Tormé and Cleo Laine album), 1991
- Nothing Without You (Smokie Norful album) or the title song, 2004
- Nothing Without You (EP), by the Narrative, 2010

== Songs ==
- "Nothing Without You" (song), by Ami Suzuki, 1999
- "Nothing Without You", by AB6IX from 6ixense, 2019
- "Nothing Without You", by Boyzone from Brother, 2010
- "Nothing Without You", by Brandy and Sy'rai from the film Cheaper by the Dozen, 2022
- "Nothing Without You", by Fleetwood Mac from Time, 1995
- "Nothing Without You", by Mando Diao from Give Me Fire!, 2009
- "Nothing Without You", by Olly Murs from Never Been Better, 2014
- "Nothing Without You", by Simon Webbe from Smile, 2017
- "Nothing Without You", by the Weeknd from Starboy, 2016
