= Freedom Rings =

Single by Brandy

from the album B7
- Released: September 27, 2019
- Length: 3:46
- Label: Brand Nu, Inc.; eOne
- Songwriters: Jeff "Gitty" Gitelman; Sebastian Kole; Brandy Norwood; Ryan M. Tedder
- Producers: Ryghteous; Gitelman

Brandy singles chronology
"Love Again" (2019)	"Freedom Rings" (2019)	"Baby Mama" (2020)

Audio video
- "Freedom Rings" on YouTube

"Freedom Rings" is a song by American singer Brandy. Conceived during recording sessions for her seventh studio album B7 (2020), it was written by Norwood, Ryan "Ryghteous" M. Tedder, Sebastian Kole, and Jeff "Gitty" Gitelman, while production was helmed by Gitelman and Tedder. A bluesy mid-tempo track that is built on heavy guitar riffs and a foot-stomping groove, its lyrics have been described as a "declaration of independence."

Its standalone release through Norwood's newly founded label, Brand Nu Inc., and eOne Music on September 27, 2019 commenced with the 25th anniversary of her eponymous debut album Brandy in 1994. Her first release since 2016's "Beggin & Pleadin, it earned generally positive reviews from music critics, particularly for its vocal performance, and peaked at number seven on the US Billboard R&B Digital Songs in the week of October 12, 2019.

== Conception ==
"Freedom Rings" was written by Norwood, Jeff "Gitty" Gitelman, Sebastian Kole, and Ryan "Ryghteous" M. Tedder, while production on the song was overseen by Gitelman and Tedder. A musical declaration of independence, it was recorded in Los Angeles in mid-2019 during creative sessions alongside songwriter and producer Kole with whom Norwood shared deep conversations about her freedom and what she went through. In a behind-the-scenes video of the song's creation which she later released on her YouTube account, Norwood commented on their collaboration: "I lived 'Freedom Rings.' I lived every word in this song [...] [Kole] was really able to put together a poetic to this life life I've lived so long of not being free, coming to the realization that I've been free the whole time. I just needed to click my heals three times and just realize that I had it the whole time."

== Critical reception ==
"Freedom Rings" earned generally positive reviews from music critics. Mike Wass from Idolator wrote that "Freedom Rings” is "a triumphant anthem about perseverance [...] that clearly means a lot to the enduring hitmaker." Rap-Up found that the song had Norwood showing "off her powerful pipes while sharing her testimony on the soulful rock-tinged track," while Vibe noted that "Freedom Rings" appears "to show the R&B legend shedding light on her time away from the spotlight, rediscovering what made her fall in love with music and exorcising her demons." YouKnowIGotSoul felt that the song "is very different compared to what we’ve heard from Brandy in terms of production, but vocally Brandy is bringing her A game." SoulBounce remarked that "Brandy's taking a more soulful approach than her earlier fare. The track starts with bluesy guitar riffs and a foot-stomping groove as Brandy makes her own declaration of independence."

== Chart performance ==
"Freedom Rings" peaked at number seven on the US Billboard R&B Digital Songs in the week of October 12, 2019. As of 2020, this marks Norwood's highest-charting release on the chart.

== Charts ==
Chart performance for "Freedom Rings"
Chart (2019)	Peak position
US R&B Digital Songs (Billboard)	7

== Release history ==
List of release dates, showing region, release format, label, and reference
Region	Date	Format	Label	Ref.
Various	September 27, 2019	digital download; streaming	Brand Nu, Inc.; eOne	
