= B7 (album) =

Studio album by Brandy
- Released: July 31, 2020
- Recorded: 2018–2020
- Studios: Brandon's Way; Conway; NRG; Paramount; Westlake (Los Angeles); Encore (Burbank); 11 Street (Atlanta); Platinum Sound (New York City)
- Genre: R&B
- Length: 45:49
- Labels: Brand Nu; Entertainment One
- Producers: Matthew Burnett; Darhyl "DJ" Camper; LaShawn Daniels; Jordan Evans; Hit-Boy; Brandy Norwood; Cory Rooney; Alonzo "Lonnie" Smalls II; Joshua "YXSH" Thomas

Brandy chronology
Two Eleven (2012)	B7 (2020)	Christmas with Brandy (2023)

Singles from B7
- 1. "Love Again" Released: July 5, 2019; 2. "Baby Mama" Released: May 1, 2020; 3. "Borderline" Released: July 31, 2020

B7 is the seventh studio album by American singer Brandy. It was released on July 31, 2020, through her own label Brand Nu, Inc. and Entertainment One. Her first studio album since Two Eleven (2012), the album features production from Darhyl Camper, Jr. and LaShawn Daniels, among others. B7 is an R&B album exploring themes such as self-love, tumultuous romantic relationships, mental health and single motherhood. Brandy's daughter Sy'Rai features on the song "High Heels" while Chance the Rapper features on "Baby Mama".

The album received generally positive reviews from critics, who praised the album's authenticity and cohesiveness, as well as Norwood's vocals. B7 debuted at number 12 on the US Billboard 200 chart, earning 25,000 album-equivalent units in its first week. The album and its songs were nominated for various awards, including a Grammy Award. It spawned two singles: "Baby Mama" and "Borderline". Furthermore, "No Tomorrow, Pt. 2" featuring Ty Dolla Sign, a remix of the album track "No Tomorrow" was also released in promotion of the album.

== Background and development ==
"I didn't know the world was going to be in the place that it's in right now, but I mean, everybody needs music right now. Everybody needs to feel uplifted so it's a good time and R&B is in a great place right now as well."

— Brandy during an interview with the HuffPost.

B7 is Brandy's first independent release on her own record label Brand Nu, Inc. in partnership with eOne. During an interview with the HuffPost's Taryn Finley, Brandy said she was letting her "authentic experiences inform [her] music". Despite feeling vulnerable and in relation to the global COVID-19 pandemic, Brandy said "It all aligned... I didn't plan it like this, but it just happened to fall in the same space so I'm happy about that." When asked to elaborate on why the time was right for new music, Brandy said "well, I felt like I'm in a great place in my music. I feel very strong about my music, confident about where I am with it. I believe in it, and I just felt like this was the time." Describing the album as authentic and her most personal to date, Brandy said that fans could expect her "entire heart" on the album, with themes of "love and heartache and coming into [her] own and finding [her] own self love".

== Recording and production ==
In an interview with Rolling Stone, she revealed the album had been three years in the making: "I feel like it started about three years ago. I was balancing television and studio time. I put everything I could into this project. It was so freeing for me, because I did get a chance to really dig in and write from my heart of hearts. I was able to really get a lot of things off of my chest, really use music as a way to escape and heal." Speaking about the process of making the album, Brandy was clear about the dedication she put into the project: "I've dedicated the last couple of years of my life to new music, my new project. It's taken me a while, but I'm so happy about the focus and work ethic I've put into this project." This concept was expanded upon during her interview with Apple Music, where she stated: "I felt like I wanted to just be as honest as possible with this new project. I wanted to approach this project like if this was my last chance, if this was my last shot at creating music, what would this project be about? What would it sound like? Would I just bare it all? Would I tell my story as deep as I could tell it? And I wanted to, of course, stay true to R&B but at the same time go outside of the box." Similarly, when talking to Entertainment Weekly, Brandy said that she treated the album like it was her last: "I went into this album thinking, 'If this were my last project, if this were the last time I would ever sing…what would I do?' I used that [mindset] as a way to give my all. You can hear my entire heart on this. It took a while because I didn't want to rush."

When asked why Brandy chose Darhyl "DJ" Camper, Jr. to helm the project, she shared: "His tracks were so different, but still connected to me in a way where it didn't feel so different from what I’ve done. It was almost like a continuation. When I would hear his music it was like, 'This is what Never Say Never would sound like in the future.'" Norwood co-wrote and co-produced 14 of the 15 songs on the album and, alongside Camper, worked with the likes of LaShawn Daniels and Kimberly "Kaydence" Krysiuk, touching on a number of themes, including self-love, tumultuous romantic relationships, mental health and single motherhood. Krysiuk contributed to nine of the album's 15 songs, and commented on the process of developing the songs alongside Norwood: "when we wrote these records, we didn't follow a 'formula' or song structure [...] we followed a feeling [...] That alone really gave us the room to express our emotions without being confined to an industry standard."

Partway through the making of the album, Daniels, an early career mentor for Norwood, died. During an interview with British newspaper The Guardian, Norwood said that "music [was her] therapy" and she "[wouldn't] know what life would be without it." Elaborating on being able to work with Daniels on the project, she said "it's a little scary because I had to finish it without him [...] I just wonder: would he be proud of what I was able to put together?". In the interview, it was also confirmed that she had co-written every song on the album, wanting to stop "placating egos", "chasing commercial expectations" and not have her experiences "distilled into other people's words."

== Music and lyrics ==
B7 opens with the "warm and sincere" track "Saving All My Love" which opens with the line "Sorry for my tardy," addressing the eight year period since Brandy's previous album Two Eleven (2012). Interpreted by some critics as an "apology," it has her explaining her absence from music following the break-up of her relationship with music executive Ryan Press. Brandy can be heard referring to her mentor, Whitney Houston as the "goat" — a common acronym attributed to singer Houston, meaning "the greatest of all time." The album's third track "Rather Be" was co-written with Victoria Monét and sees Brandy return to the distinctive smooth, sultry balladry of previous albums. Brandy can be heard to be warmly wearing her heart on her sleeve as her love interest plays hard-to-get.

"Borderline" sees Brandy confront her own insecurities and weaknesses within relationships, with her professing to be "the most jealous girl" and ultimately illustrating the darker, emotional loneliness that can take over a romantic relationship Of the song, Brandy stated that "if another artist were to have that song, were to sing that song, I would wish that song was my song." In an interview with the New York Post, she shared the story behind the single, "I loved someone that was not available to be loved by me, and so that drove me crazy," adding, "I wanted to use my music as a way to start more conversations about mental health and how that's something that we all need to work on every day."

On "I Am More", Brandy references rapper Eminem's lyrics from The Notorious B.I.G.'s posthumous single, "Dead Wrong" (1999). Additionally on "High Heels", she duets with her daughter Sy'rai and also raps one of the verses. Brandy previously introduced her rapping skills under the alter-ego Bran'Nu. The album closes with "Bye BiPolar" —- a piano-led ballad which utilises a metaphor that Brandy has been using for her own love life, discussing the way that her mental health struggles have been exacerbated by toxic relationships. Lyrically, in freeing herself from them, the singer discusses how her own mental health has improved. Brandy told the New York Post: "I have not been diagnosed as bipolar [...] but I’ve had moments where trauma has caused me to not be myself, and I felt at a point that I could've experienced moments of that." Mental illness is a recurring lyrical theme on the album as is heard in "Unconditional Oceans" which addresses her past of "self-sabotaging" behaviour, and "Lucid Dreams" where Brandy openly confesses to having "wanted to die". B7 ends on "Bye BiPolar"'s bold lyric — "Never add your last name to mine. I'm saying never", a reference to her 1998 album Never Say Never, while also marking Brandy's personal growth and transition since then.

== Title and artwork ==
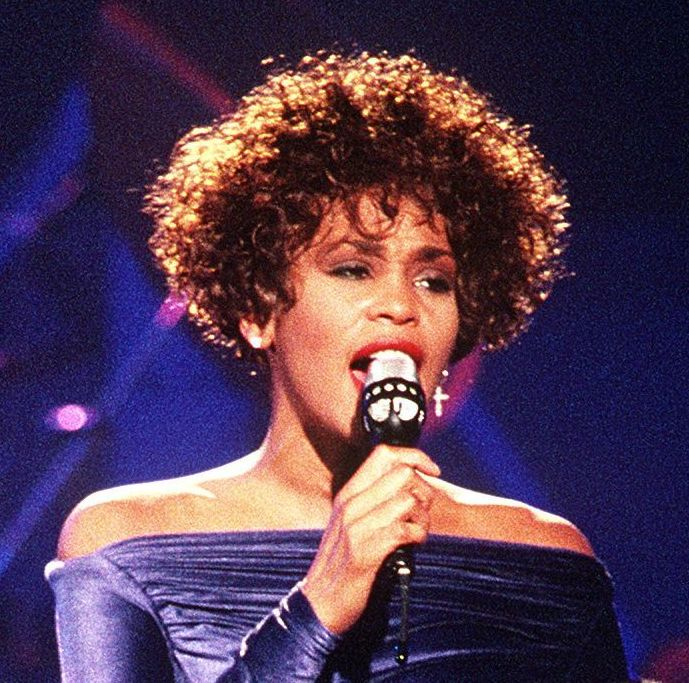
Norwood's look on B7's cover artwork was compared to American singer and Norwood's idol Whitney Houston.

The album's cover artwork and title were unveiled on May 7, 2020. The title stands for "Brandy seven", as the album is her seventh studio effort, while the album cover pays homage to Whitney Houston's looks from the 1992 film The Bodyguard. In the photo, Brandy is pictured face forward towards the camera with "beads cascading down her forehead". Glennisha Morgan from KISS 95.1 FM commented that the cover featured Brandy's signature braids, and the choice of gold beads complimented the gold eye shadow in the photo. In writing for Essence, Jennifer Ford called the album's cover nostalgic, and noted that although Brandy had "countless memorable braid moments", the micro braids chosen for the B7 cover "may be the greatest of all time". The look was designed and styled by celebrity hairstylist Kim Kimble. Meanwhile, Morgan also pointed out that the font used on the cover and its typeface were the same as Brandy's first three studio albums' covers: Brandy (1994), Never Say Never (1998) and Full Moon (2002). Comparisons were also drawn to singer-songwriter Syreeta Wright, who often wore her hair in braids too. The cover art received positive comments from 107.5 FM, who declared that they "loved" the cover. Idolator's Mike Wass agreed, saying that the "orange-and-gold-hued cover art" shows that Brandy was "back and she really means business this time around".

== Release and promotion ==
Prior to the album's release, Norwood appeared on Good Morning America on May 7, 2020, to perform its lead single "Baby Mama" live during the 2020 Spring Concert Series, where she would also announce her seventh studio album and reveal the album cover. On July 21, the album was made available for pre-order, which included instant downloads for "Baby Mama", duet with Daniel Caesar "Love Again", and a new song "Rather Be". B7 was released on July 31 by Norwood's own label Brand Nu, Inc. in collaboration with eOne Music.

The album's second single "Borderline" was performed as part of Brandy's Verzuz battle against fellow R&B singer Monica on August 31, 2020 at Tyler Perry Studios in Atlanta. "Borderline" was also performed at the 2020 Billboard Music Awards, alongside Norwood's song "Almost Doesn't Count" (1998) and B7's third and final single "No Tomorrow, Pt. 2" with Ty Dolla Sign, at the Dolby Theatre in Los Angeles on October 14. Norwood also performed "Borderline" as a part of a medley alongside her song "Say Something" at the 2020 Soul Train Music Awards. Norwood also performed songs from B7 and past singles at Dick Clark's New Year's Rockin' Eve 2021. Norwood performed "Rather Be" on COLORS video series A Colors Show which premiered on the COLORS YouTube on June 24, 2022.

== Singles ==
In March 2020, it was announced that Norwood would release the album's lead single "Baby Mama", featuring American recording artist Chance the Rapper, on the American talk show The Talk. However, due to the COVID-19 pandemic, the single was postponed and instead released on May 1, 2020. "Baby Mama" failed to chart on the US Billboard Hot 100, becoming Norwood's first lead single to do so, but managed to find success within other Billboard charts, debuting at number 23 on the US Adult R&B Songs in the week ending May 9, 2020 and eventually going on to peak at number seven on July 20, 2020. An accompanying music video was directed by Derek Blanks and Frank Gatson Jr., the latter of whom Norwood had frequently collaborated with throughout her career, including for music videos for "I Wanna Be Down" (1994) and "Put It Down" (2012). Filmed in the week of January 29, 2020, prior to the COVID-19 pandemic, the video premiered on BET outlets on May 4, 2020.

The music video for the second single "Borderline" premiered on July 31, 2020, the same day it was released as a single and that B7 was released. Like "Baby Mama", the video for "Borderline" was directed by Blanks and Gatson Jr. On August 19, 2020, she released a behind-the-scenes look at the making of the "Borderline" video. The song peaked at number 30 on the US R&B/Hip-Hop Airplay chart.

On October 14, Norwood announced that singer Ty Dolla Sign was to be featured on a remix of "No Tomorrow". The collaboration, titled "No Tomorrow, Pt. 2", was released in promotion of the album the same day. On the collaboration, Brandy said: "I'm a huge fan of Ty Dolla $ign. I think he's a brilliant artist. He's always shown a lot of respect for my music so I just felt like the sound of our voices would be great [sic]."

== Critical reception ==
Professional ratings
Aggregate scores
Source	Rating
AnyDecentMusic?	7.3/10
Metacritic	78/100
Review scores
Source	Rating
Albumism	4.5/5 stars
AllMusic	4.5/5 stars
Clash	8/10
Exclaim!	7/10
NME	3/5 stars
The Observer	4/5 stars
Pitchfork	6.8/10
Tom Hull – on the Web	B+

B7 was met with generally positive reviews. At Metacritic, which assigns a normalized rating out of 100 to reviews from professional critics, the album received an average score of 78, based on 6 reviews. Aggregator AnyDecentMusic? gave the album 7.3 out of 10, based on their assessment of the critical consensus. Teodor Zetko, writing for Exclaim!, found that with B7 "Brandy has returned to her roots and the aesthetics that helped popularize her [...]. Authenticity is present on this album; she confidently steers her own ship by taking a new approach by writing every song on the album to create something personal [...] She was the moment in the '90s, and now she is the moment in 2020." The Chicago Defender journalist Kimberly M. Dobine felt that "This album is a vibe, very reminiscent of what we have come to expect from Brandy, yet so distinctly different then what we are used to [...] I believe this is the Brandy that she's always wanted to be and always wanted us to experience [...] It's cohesive, and the most honest reflection of who she is as an artist today. She is back and better than ever." In an interview with Brandy published July 31, 2020, Brittany Spanos for Rolling Stone referred to the album as "Brandy Norwood at her purest: an eclectic mix of modern and classic R&B sounds strung together by her distinctive, powerful voice."

Michigan Chronicle critic Ashley Stevenson wrote that "throughout the album, Brandy toys with techno undertones without losing her iconic sultriness bending her voice to each track, even doing some rapping. Although the album is met with mild moments of mediocrity, it never lacks enticement." Similarly, Mike Weiss from Idolator wrote that "this project shows new facets of her wonderful instrument as she muses on matters of the heart over multi-layered, often mid-tempo production. In short, B7 is a mood. This is the kind of album that needs to be listened to from beginning to end (a couple of times), in order to fully appreciate the very personal journey that Brandy takes us on." In her review for The Observer, Kadish Morris was critical with Brandy's rapping effort on songs such as "High Heels" but praised the album's "familiar acrobatic vocals and sublime harmonies." Will Lavin from NME gave a positive review, stating that although the album "could probably benefit from an injection of tempo from time to time [...] it mostly thrives, thanks to her unwavering resilience, the unique texture of her vocals and the stellar production courtesy of DJ Camper, Lonnie Smalls II and the late LaShawn Daniels." Lavin added the new album had been worth the wait, "because it has helped one of R&B's most revered talents find her smile again." Joel Campbell from The Voice called the album a "first masterpiece as an independent artist", whilst Danielle Brissett for Rated RnB praised the project for the "Sonorous harmonies, potent backgrounds and ad-libs, and an influential delivery that true connoisseurs can detect. Clash editor Robin Murray called the album "a triumph. A record worth savouring, it sits alongside NewGen R&B talent [...] while retaining that classic touch." However, Murray also picked out "Borderline", stating the track is "no more than nice – pleasing on the ear, tugging at the heartstrings, but fail[s] to match the gravitational pull of the record's true highlights." Stephen Kearse for Pitchfork gave the album 6.8 out of 10, feeling that Brandy sounded "poised and warm but lack[ed] some spark". Kearse added "There's a strong sense of distance to B7, as if Brandy is recounting stories secondhand despite them ostensibly being her own. She's described the record [...] as "freeing," but she generally feels more withdrawn than liberated."

== Accolades ==
=== Awards ===
List of award nominations and wins for B7
Year	Award	Category	Nominee(s)	Result	Ref.
2020	Grammy Award	Best R&B Performance	"Love Again"	Nominated	
2020	Soul Train Music Award	Best R&B/Soul Female Artist	Brandy	Nominated	
2020	Soul Train Music Award	Soul Train Certified Award	Brandy	Won	
2020	Soul Train Music Award	Best Album of the Year	B7	Nominated	
2021	NAACP Image Award	Outstanding Album	B7	Nominated	

=== Year-end awards ===
B7 was featured on several 2020 year-end listings, including Rated R&B's "The 30 Best R&B Albums of 2020: Staff Picks", AllMusic's "Best of 2020", The Boston Globe's "Top 12 Best Pop Albums of 2020" and HipHopDX's "Best R&B Albums of 2020".

Year-end rankings for B7
Publication	Accolade	Rank	Ref.
Albumism	The 100 Best Albums of 2020	12	
Billboard	The 10 Best R&B Albums of 2020	10	
Billboard	The 50 Best Albums of 2020	42	
Houston Chronicle	Joey Guerra's favorite albums of 2020	3	
Rated R&B	The 30 Best R&B Albums of 2020	1	
Uproxx	The Best R&B Albums of 2020	19	

== Commercial performance ==
B7 debuted at number 12 on the US Billboard 200 chart, moving 25,200 album-equivalent units, including 15,000 in pure sales, in its first week. The album was the highest debut of the week and Brandy's eighth Billboard 200 chart entry. The album also debuted at number 9 on the US Top R&B/Hip-Hop Albums, becoming her seventh top-ten album on the chart. Additionally, B7 debuted at number one on the US Independent Albums chart.

In the United Kingdom, B7 debuted at number two on the UK R&B Albums chart, marking Brandy's highest debut on any UK chart since Full Moon debuted atop the same chart in March 2002. Additionally, the album debuted at numbers seven and nine on the UK Independent and UK Digital Albums, respectively.

== Track listing ==
B7 track listing
No.	Title	Writer(s)	Producer(s)	Length
1.	"Saving All My Love"	Brandy Norwood; Darhyl Camper, Jr.	Camper, Jr.; Alonzo "Lonnie" Smalls II; Norwood; Aaron Smith^{[a]}	4:42
2.	"Unconditional Oceans"	Norwood; Kim "Kaydence" Krysiuk; Akil "Fresh" King	Camper, Jr.; Smalls II; Norwood; LaShawn Daniels^{[b]}	3:52
3.	"Rather Be"	Norwood; Antonio "Tony" Dixon; Victoria McCants; Camper, Jr.	Camper, Jr.; Daniels; Norwood; Dixon^{[b]}	2:50
4.	"All My Life, Pt. 1"	Norwood; Krysiuk; King; Camper, Jr.		0:40
5.	"Lucid Dreams"	Norwood; Krysiuk; King; Camper, Jr.	Camper, Jr.; Daniels; Norwood	3:41
6.	"Borderline"	Norwood; Krysiuk; Camper, Jr.; Al Sherrod Lambert; Charles McAllister	Camper, Jr.; Daniels; Norwood	5:12
7.	"No Tomorrow"	Norwood; Joshua "YXSH" Thomas	Thomas; Norwood; Cory Rooney; Camper, Jr.^{[c]}	3:01
8.	"Say Something"	Norwood; Camper, Jr.; Vania "Nia V" Khaleh-Pari; Larry Lee "Price" Jacks, Jr.; "Sean 1da" Wander	Camper, Jr.; Norwood	3:04
9.	"All My Life, Pt. 2"	Norwood; Krysiuk; King; Camper, Jr.		0:40
10.	"I Am More"	Norwood; Krysiuk; King	Camper, Jr.; Daniels; Norwood	3:15
11.	"High Heels" (with Sy'Rai)	Norwood; Sy'rai Smith; Krysiuk; King; Camper, Jr.	Camper, Jr.; Norwood	2:38
12.	"Baby Mama" (featuring Chance the Rapper)	Norwood; Krysiuk; King; Chancelor Bennett; Chauncey Alexander Hollis; Smith	Hit-Boy; Daniels; Norwood	3:14
13.	"All My Life, Pt. 3"	Norwood; Krysiuk; King; Camper, Jr.		0:39
14.	"Love Again" (with Daniel Caesar)	Norwood; Ashton D. Simmonds; Edward Blackmon; Matthew Burnett; Camper, Jr.; Jordan Evans; Matthew Leon	Evans; Burnett; Camper, Jr.^{[a]}	3:34
15.	"Bye Bipolar"	Norwood; Krysiuk; Camper, Jr.	Camper, Jr.; Daniels; Norwood	4:47
Total length:				45:49

Notes

- ^{^[a]} denotes additional production
- ^{^[b]} denotes vocal producer
- ^{^[c]} denotes co-producer

== Personnel ==
Credits adapted from the liner notes of B7.

- Benard Alexander – production coordinator
- Andy Barnes – engineer
- Riley Bell – mixing
- Todd Bergman – engineer
- Derek Blanks – art direction, photography, packaging design
- Paul Boutin – recording
- Matthew Burnett – producer, drum programming
- Daniel Caesar – lead vocals (Note: Daniel Caesar is co-credited as a lead artist on "Love Again"; the song was released as the lead single from Caesar's second studio album Case Study 01 (2019).)
- Darhyl Camper, Jr. – producer, executive producer, additional producer (keys and programming), co-producer
- Chance the Rapper – featured vocals
- LaShawn Daniels – producer, executive producer, vocal producer, vocal arranger
- Antonio "Tony" Dixon – additional vocal producer, engineer
- Morning Estrada – recording
- Jordan Evans – producer, drum programming, recording
- Frank Gatson, Jr. – creative direction
- Chauncey Alexander "Hit-Boy" Hollis – producer
- Jaycen Joshua – mixing, mastering
- Kim Kimble – hair
- Tim McClain – engineer
- Brandy Norwood – lead vocals, producer, executive producer, mixing
- Willie Norwood Sr. – vocal coach, music consultant
- Cory Rooney – producer, co-executive producer
- Christopher Ruff – production co-ordinator
- Alonzo "Lonnie" Smalls II – producer
- Sy'rai Smith – lead vocals, (Note: Sy'rai Smith is co-credited as a lead artist on "High Heels".) background vocals
- Courtney Snowden – production manager
- Tasha Stoute – PR, marketing
- Ashley Sean Thomas – wardrobe
- Joshua "YXSH" Thomas – producer
- Gabriela Torell – make-up
- Earl "Ejay" Washington – engineer

== Charts ==
=== Weekly charts ===
Weekly chart performance for B7
Chart (2020)	Peak position
Swiss Albums (Schweizer Hitparade)	67
UK Album Downloads Chart	9
UK Albums Sales (OCC)	34
UK Independent Albums (Official Charts)	7
UK R&B Albums (Official Charts)	2
US Billboard 200	12
US Independent Albums (Billboard)	1
US Top R&B/Hip-Hop Albums (Billboard)	9

=== Year-end charts ===
2020 year-end chart performance for B7
Chart (2020)	Position
US Top Current Album Sales (Billboard)	165

== Release history ==
Release dates and formats for B7
Region	Date	Format(s)	Label(s)	Ref.
Various	July 31, 2020	CD; digital download; streaming; vinyl	Brand Nu; eOne (Note: B7 was released in Japan by Victor Entertainment and in Europe by SPV GmbH.)	
