= H.E.R. (album) =

Compilation album by H.E.R.
- Released: October 20, 2017
- Genre: R&B
- Length: 71:50
- Label: RCA
- Producers: Ant B; Knox Brown; Daniel Caesar; Darhyl "Hey DJ" Camper Jr.; Grades; David "Swagg R'celious" Harris; H.E.R.; Lophiile; MNEK; Qreamy Beats; Mike "Scribz" Riley; Syk Sense

H.E.R. chronology
H.E.R. Volume 2, The B Sides (2017)	H.E.R. (2017)	I Used to Know Her: The Prelude (2018)

Singles from H.E.R.
- 1. "Focus" Released: September 8, 2016

H.E.R. is the first compilation album by American singer and songwriter H.E.R. It was released through RCA Records on October 20, 2017. The album comprises songs from the singer's EPs H.E.R., Vol. 1 (2016) and H.E.R., Vol. 2 (2017), and includes six additional songs. The album won Best R&B Album, as well as Best R&B Performance for the song, "Best Part" (with Daniel Caesar) and received four other nominations at the 61st Grammy Awards, including Album of the Year and Best New Artist for H.E.R.

At the age of 14, Gabi Wilson signed a recording contract with RCA Records, after performing covers of Alicia Keys songs on the television shows such as Maury, Today and The View. Her first EP, H.E.R., Vol. 1, was released on September 9, 2016, and peaked at number 28 on Billboard's Top R&B/Hip-Hop Albums chart. Her second EP, H.E.R., Vol. 2, was released on June 16, 2017. It peaked at number 49 on the all-genre Billboard 200 and number 22 on Top R&B/Hip-Hop Albums.

The compilation album, H.E.R., released on October 20, 2017. The record includes the songs from the two prior EPs, along with six new tracks, including the duet song, "Best Part", in which also includes on Daniel Caesar's, Freudian (2017). The six new songs were also released on a third EP, H.E.R., Vol. 2: The B-Sides, on October 20, 2017. This EP peaked at number 139 on the Billboard 200.

== Awards ==
It won the Album/Mixtape of the Year at the 2018 Soul Train Music Awards. The album won Best R&B Album, as well as Best R&B Performance for the song "Best Part" with Daniel Caesar at the 61st Grammy Awards and also received a nomination for Album of the Year.

== Commercial performance ==
H.E.R. peaked at number 23 on the US Billboard 200 and number 14 on the US Top R&B/Hip-Hop Albums chart. On January 16, 2020, the album was certified platinum by the Recording Industry Association of America (RIAA) for combined sales and album-equivalent units of over a million units in the United States.

Until the week of February 24, 2024, the compilation held the record of being the longest-charting compilation album by a female artist in the history of the Billboard 200 at 181 weeks, before Whitney Houston's I Will Always Love You: The Best of Whitney Houston replaced it at 182 weeks on that chart. On the Top R&B Albums chart, it spent 208 weeks and holds second place behind Houston's compilation as the longest-charting female compilation on that chart as well.

== Track listing ==
Credits adapted from Spotify.

No.	Title	Writer(s)	Producer(s)	Length
1.	"Losing"	Gabriella Wilson; Darhyl Camper Jr.; Hue "SoundzFire" Strother	H.E.R.; DJ Camper	3:46
2.	"Avenue"	Wilson; Tiara Thomas; Tyler Acord	Lophiile	3:34
3.	"Let Me In"	Wilson; Andrew Knox Brown	Knox Brown	4:57
4.	"Lights On"	Wilson; Daniel Traynor; Michael Orabiyi; Talay Riley	H.E.R.; Scribz Riley; GRADES	3:40
5.	"Say It Again"	Wilson; Camper; Strother	H.E.R.; Camper	2:52
6.	"Facts"	Wilson; Camper; Strother; Jermaine Elliott	H.E.R.; Camper	3:39
7.	"Focus"	Wilson; Camper; Justin Love	H.E.R.; Camper	3:20
8.	"U"	Wilson; Ambré Perkins; David "Swagg R'celious" Harris	H.E.R.; Swagg R'celious	2:59
9.	"Every Kind of Way"	Wilson; Camper; Strother	Camper	2:40
10.	"Best Part" (featuring Daniel Caesar)	Wilson; Ashton Simmonds; Jordan Evans; Matthew Burnett; Riley Bell	H.E.R.; Daniel Caesar	3:29
11.	"Changes"	Wilson; Keithen Foster; Perkins; Harris; J. "Grip" Jordan-Jones; Gabriel Garzón-Montano	H.E.R.; Swagg R'celious	3:34
12.	"Jungle"	Anthony Jefferies; Aubrey Graham; Carlo Montagnese; Garzón-Montano; Ilsey Juber; Jordan Ullman; Majid Al-Maskati; Noah Shebib	H.E.R.; Swagg R'celious	5:05
13.	"Free"	Wilson; Camper; Elijah Dias	H.E.R.; Camper	3:18
14.	"Rather Be"	Wilson; Alja Jackson; Harris; Keithen Foster	H.E.R.; Swagg Rcelious	3:09
15.	"2"	Wilson; Ryan Cecil Campbell; Uzoechi Emenike	H.E.R.; MNEK; Ryan Ashley	3:09
16.	"Hopes Up"	Wilson; Anthony Bryant; Harris; Dias	Swagg R'celious; Ant B	3:06
17.	"Still Down"	Wilson; Camper; Strother; Lolo Zouai	H.E.R.; Camper	2:49
18.	"Wait for It"	Wilson; Andre Harris; Camper; Strother; Marsha Ambrosius; Natalie Stewart	H.E.R.; Camper	2:16
19.	"Pigment"	Wilson; Maurice-Brandon Ferguson; Robert Glasper; Shafiq Husayn	H.E.R.; Qreamybeats	2:59
20.	"Gone Away"	Wilson; Anesha Birchett; Antea Shelton; Christopher McClenney; Joshua Scruggs	H.E.R.; Syk Sense	4:10
21.	"I Won't"	Wilson; Camper; Jordan-Jones; Strother	H.E.R.; Camper	3:31

== Charts ==
=== Weekly charts ===
Weekly chart performance for H.E.R.
Chart (2017–19)	Peak position
Belgian Albums (Ultratop Wallonia)	46
Canadian Albums (Billboard)	58
French Albums (SNEP)	28
Japanese Download Albums (Billboard Japan)	76
Swiss Albums (Schweizer Hitparade)	30
US Billboard 200	23
US Top R&B/Hip-Hop Albums (Billboard)	14

=== Year-end charts ===
Chart (2018)	Position
US Billboard 200	68
US Top R&B/Hip-Hop Albums (Billboard)	39
Chart (2019)	Position
US Billboard 200	82
US Top R&B/Hip-Hop Albums (Billboard)	70
Chart (2020)	Position
US Billboard 200	145

== Certifications ==
Region	Certification	Certified units/sales
Canada (Music Canada)	Gold	40,000^{‡}
France (SNEP)	Gold	50,000^{‡}
United Kingdom (BPI)	Silver	60,000^{‡}
United States (RIAA)	Platinum	1,000,000^{‡}
^{‡} Sales+streaming figures based on certification alone.
