= Focus (H.E.R. song) =

2016 song by H.E.R.

Single by H.E.R.

from the album H.E.R.
- Released: September 8, 2016
- Genre: R&B
- Length: 3:20
- Songwriters: Gabriella Wilson; Darhyl Camper Jr.; Justin Love; Andre Sims
- Producers: H.E.R.; Camper; Andre Sims

H.E.R. singles chronology
"Something to Prove" (2014)	"Focus" (2016)	"Best Part" (2017)

"Focus" is a song by American singer H.E.R. released on September 8, 2016. It was included on her self-titled album released in 2017. A remix with Chris Brown, hosted by DJ Envy, was released on May 1, 2018, with Brown and H.E.R. exchanging verses.

== Background ==
Justin Love, an artist from New Jersey who co-wrote the song, revealed that "Focus" is about his mother.

Pianist/Composer Andre Sims created composition Endless Minds in 2004, which the hit song Focus, performed by H.E.R, is derived from.

== Commercial performance ==
"Focus" topped the Adult R&B Songs airplay chart in October 2018, becoming H.E.R.'s first number one on a Billboard songs chart.

== Accolades ==
"Focus" was nominated for the Soul Train Music Award for The Ashford & Simpson Songwriter's Award at the 2018 Soul Train Music Awards and for the Grammy Award for Best R&B Song at the 61st Annual Grammy Awards but lost both to "Boo'd Up" by Ella Mai.

== Charts ==
Chart (2017)	Peak position
US Billboard Hot 100	100
US Hot R&B/Hip-Hop Songs (Billboard)	45
US Hot R&B Songs (Billboard)	7
US R&B/Hip-Hop Airplay (Billboard)	15
US Adult R&B Songs (Billboard)	1

== Certifications ==
Region	Certification	Certified units/sales
New Zealand (RMNZ)	Platinum	30,000^{‡}
United Kingdom (BPI)	Silver	200,000^{‡}
United States (RIAA)	2× Platinum	2,000,000^{‡}
^{‡} Sales+streaming figures based on certification alone.
