= No Tomorrow, Pt. 2 =

2020 single by Brandy featuring Ty Dolla Sign

Single by Brandy featuring Ty Dolla Sign^{[a]}
- Released: October 14, 2020
- Studio: Conway Recording Studios (Los Angeles, CA)
- Length: 3:05
- Label: Brand Nu; eOne
- Songwriters: Brandy Norwood; Joshua "YXSH" Thomas; Tyrone Griffin, Jr.
- Producers: Norwood; Thomas; Cory Rooney; DJ Camper

Brandy singles chronology
"Borderline" (2020)	"No Tomorrow, Pt. 2" (2020)	"Starting Now" (2021)

Ty Dolla Sign singles chronology
"Oops (I'm Sorry)" (2020)	"No Tomorrow, Pt. 2" (2020)	"Spicy" (2020)

Audio video
- "No Tomorrow, Pt. 2" on YouTube

"No Tomorrow, Pt. 2" is a song by American singer Brandy Norwood, featuring fellow American singer Ty Dolla Sign. It is a remix of the song "No Tomorrow" taken from Norwood's seventh studio album, B7 (2020). "No Tomorrow" is a minimalist mid-tempo track with instrumentation from synthesizers, a piano, bass kicks, and finger snaps. It was written by Norwood and Joshua "YXSH" Thomas, while production was handled by Norwood, Thomas and Cory Rooney, with co-production by Darhyl "DJ" Camper.

The remix was released on October 14, 2020. "No Tomorrow" was part of Norwood's set lists of her performances at the Billboard Music Awards and on Dick Clark's New Year's Rockin' Eve in 2020.

== Background ==
Brandy Norwood and Joshua "YXSH" Thomas wrote the lyrics of "No Tomorrow", while its production was handled by Norwood, Thomas, and Cory Rooney, with additional production from Darhyl "DJ" Camper. Additional lyrics for the remix were penned by singer Ty Dolla Sign. On the collaboration, Norwood said: "I'm a huge fan of Ty Dolla $ign. I think he's a brilliant artist. He's always shown a lot of respect for my music so I just felt like the sound of our voices would be great."

== Critical reception ==
"No Tomorrow" received generally positive reviews from music critics. Adi Mehta, writing for Entertainment Voice, called the song "effortlessly catchy". He found that it "features a memorable chorus full of priceless lines like "I'm gon' blow your phone up / In case there is no tomorrow," and is stunning in the way jagged pieces fall into elegant arrangements of vocals, resolving when Brandy finally declares, "I feel so beautiful"." The Chicago Defender journalist Kimberly M. Dobine cited "No Tomorrow" as one of her favorite songs on B7. She remarked that "the clever vocal arrangements [on the track] show us that she is proudly embracing who she is as an artist, and the "Vocal Bible", we have come to admire."

Teodor Zetko, writing for Exclaim!, found that the song "smoothly — and slightly nihilistically — celebrates a romance and the immediacy of indulging in infatuation, to reduce regret as if life will cease tomorrow." AllMusic editor Andy Kellman called the song a "dizzied love song" and ranked it along with "Rather Be" among "the sweetest songs in her catalog". Pitchfork's Stephen Kearse complimented Camper, Daniels, and Norwood's joint production on the track and wrote: "The propulsive finger snaps and bass kicks of “No Tomorrow” contrast the song's grim subject matter about the end of a relationship."

== Live performances ==
On October 14, 2020, Norwood performed "No Tomorrow, Pt. 2" live for the first time as part of a medley, also consisting of previous single "Borderline" and her 1999 single "Almost Doesn't Count", at the Billboard Music Awards. Her first performance at the awards ceremony in twenty-five years, she performed without a live audience due to COVID-19 protocols, wearing black pants and a lacy white top with long jacket, with her hair braided in various top knots. Ty Dolla $ign joined her only for the "No Tomorrow" portion of the medley. The pair sang to each other while maintaining their distance on stage. Norwood received generally positive reviews, with Stephen Daw from Billboard calling it "a stunning medley". In his review for TVLine's Andy Swift declared the performance a "triumphant return".

== Credits and personnel ==
Credits lifted from the liner notes of B7.

- Andy Barnes – engineer
- DJ Camper – co-producer
- Jaycen Joshua – mastering, mixing
- Brandy Norwood – producer, vocals, writer
- Cory Rooney – producer
- Joshua "YXSH" Thomas – producer, writer
- Ty Dolla Sign – vocals, writer (Part 2)

== Release history ==
List of release dates, showing region, release format, label and reference
Region	Date	Version	Format	Label	Ref.
Various	July 31, 2020	Album version	Digital download; streaming	Brand Nu, Inc.; eOne	
Various	October 14, 2020	Single version	Digital download; streaming	Brand Nu, Inc.; eOne	

== Notes ==
^{^[a]} The version featured on B7 is a solo version of the song. The Ty Dolla Sign version is a remix of the album version.
