= 99 Souls =

British house duo

- Origin: United Kingdom
- Genre: House
- Years active: 2014–present
- Members: Soul; Jo

99 Souls are a British house duo. They are best known for their 2015 single "The Girl Is Mine", a mash-up of Destiny's Child's "Girl" and Brandy and Monica's "The Boy Is Mine". The single peaked at number five on the UK Singles Chart in January 2016.

== Career ==
In 2014, they released the single "The Girl Is Mine", which is a mash-up of Destiny's Child's "Girl" and Brandy and Monica's "The Boy Is Mine". The song was re-released on 6 November 2015 with Beyoncé's consent and a re-recorded vocal from Brandy. The song peaked at number five on the UK Singles Chart.

== Discography ==
=== Singles ===
Title	Year	Peak chart positions		Certifications	Album
Title	Year	UK	AUS	Certifications	Album
"The Girl Is Mine" (featuring Destiny's Child and Brandy)	2015	5	33	BPI: 2× Platinum; IRMA: Platinum; ARIA: Gold	TBA

== Awards and nominations ==
Year	Award	Category	Work	Result
2016	MTV Video Music Awards	Best Electronic Video	"The Girl Is Mine" (featuring Destiny's Child and Brandy)	Nominated
