= Love Again (Brandy and Daniel Caesar song) =

2019 song by Brandy & Daniel Caesar

Single by Brandy and Daniel Caesar

from the album Case Study 01 and B7
- Released: July 5, 2019
- Recorded: 2018
- Studio: Paramount Studios (Los Angeles, CA); Brandon's Way Recording Studios (Los Angeles, CA)
- Genre: R&B
- Length: 3:34
- Label: Brand Nu; Golden Child; eOne
- Songwriters: Brandy Norwood; Ashton Simmonds; Jordan Evans; Matthew Burnett; Mathew Leon; Darhyl Camper, Jr.; Edward Blackmon
- Producers: Evans; Burnett

Brandy singles chronology
| "I Could Be Wrong" (2018) | "Love Again" (2019) | "Freedom Rings" (2019) |

Daniel Caesar singles chronology
| "Who Hurt You?" (2018) | "Love Again" (2019) | "Peaches" (2021) |

Audio video
- "Love Again" on YouTube

"Love Again" is a song by American recording artist Brandy and Canadian recording artist Daniel Caesar from Caesar's second album Case Study 01 and Brandy's seventh album B7. It was released to streaming and digital outlets as a single on July 5, 2019.

== Background ==
In 2018, it was revealed that Daniel Caesar and Brandy Norwood were in the recording studio together. Both Norwood and Caesar were working on their respective albums at the time, and rumors of a duet began to arise. On June 28, 2019, Caesar released his second album Case Study 01, which featured the song. Norwood recorded a solo version of the song and released it as an online lyric video on June 19, 2020, as promotion for her seventh studio album, B7.

== Critical reception ==
The song received generally positive reviews from music critics upon its release. Gil Kaufman from Billboard noted that the song "perfectly blends Brandy's signature breathy, sultry vocals and Caesar's soulful singing." The Daily Californian praised the song in its review of Caesar's album, comparing it to Caesar's duet with R&B singer H.E.R., calling the song "sweet and sanguine," while noting that vocally "Caesar's siren cadence melds delectably into Brandy's low, riff-filled croons." Robin Murray for Clash Music also praised the song, calling it the "perfect collaboration" and a "neat balance between raw youth and experience." Holly Gordon of the Canadian Broadcasting Corporation also gave the song a positive review, calling it a "slow burn of an earworm that is begging for a smooth set of repeats."

In a dissatisfied review of Caesar's album, Vice gave the song a positive review, specifically praising Brandy's vocals and contribution, noting Brandy's "growling passion," saying that she sounds "as youthful as she did [on albums like 1998's Never Say Never]. Overall, Vice concluded that the song "is a great reminder for anyone who had ever discounted her legacy in R&B". Now regarded the song "one of the simplest songs on the album," but also referred to it as "one of the best [songs on the album]."

== Release and impact ==
"Love Again" debuted on June 28, 2019, with worldwide premiere on iHeartRadio, playing on the hour every on the hour. Following its release, the song debuted at number 24 on the US Bubbling Under Hot 100 Singles chart and was the most added song at Urban AC radio format for three consecutive weeks. Internationally, it debuted at number 95 on the Canadian Hot 100, and at number 15 on the New Zealand Hot 40 Singles chart. The song was then released as a single via digital download and streaming on July 5, 2019.

== Promotion ==
An official lyric video was released on August 20, 2019. The visual was created by Charles Johnson Jr.

== Accolades ==
"Love Again" received a nomination for Best R&B Performance at the 62nd Grammy Awards. It lost to Anderson Paak and André 3000's "Come Home" (2019).

== Credits and personnel ==
Credits lifted from the liner notes of B7.

- Riley Bell – mixing, mastering
- Edward Blackmon – writer
- Paul Boutin – recording engineer
- Matthew Burnett – writer, producer, instruments, programming
- Daniel Caesar – performer, writer
- Darhyl Camper, Jr. – writer, additional keyboards
- Jordan Evans – writer, producer, instruments, programming
- Morning Estrada – recording engineer
- Matthew Leon – writer
- Brandy Norwood – performer, writer
- Gabriel Placentia – assistant engineer

== Charts ==
=== Weekly charts ===
Weekly chart performance for "Love Again"
| Chart (2019) | Peak position |
|---|---|
| New Zealand Hot Singles (RMNZ) | 15 |
| Canada Hot 100 (Billboard) | 95 |
| US Bubbling Under Hot 100 (Billboard) | 24 |
| US Adult R&B Songs (Billboard) | 1 |
| US R&B/Hip-Hop Airplay (Billboard) | 21 |
| US Rolling Stone Top 100 | 98 |

=== Year-end charts ===
2019 year-end chart performance for "Love Again"
| Chart (2019) | Position |
|---|---|
| US Adult R&B Songs (Billboard) | 20 |

2020 year-end chart performance for "Love Again"
| Chart (2020) | Position |
|---|---|
| US Adult R&B Songs (Billboard) | 44 |

== Certifications and sales ==
| Region | Certification | Certified units/sales |
|---|---|---|
| Canada (Music Canada) | Gold | 40,000^{‡} |
| United States (RIAA) | Gold | 500,000^{‡} |
^{‡} Sales+streaming figures based on certification alone.

== Release history ==
List of release dates, showing region, release format, label, and reference
| Region | Date | Format | Label | Ref. |
|---|---|---|---|---|
| Various | July 5, 2019 | digital download; streaming | Brand Nu, Inc.; eOne; Golden Child Recordings | |
