= The Girl Is Mine (99 Souls song) =

Single by 99 Souls featuring Destiny's Child and Brandy
- Released: 6 November 2015
- Recorded: 1997; 2004; 2015
- Genre: House
- Length: 3:33
- Label: Resilience
- Songwriters: Angela Beyincé; Beyoncé Knowles; Brandy Norwood; Donald Davis; Edward Robinson; Fred Jerkins III; Kelendria Rowland; LaShawn Daniels; Patrick Douthit; Rodney Jerkins; Japhe Tejeda; Tenitra Williams
- Producer: 99 Souls

Brandy singles chronology
"Magic" (2015)	"The Girl Is Mine" (2015)	"Beggin & Pleadin" (2016)

Destiny's Child singles chronology
"Stand Up for Love" (2005)	"The Girl Is Mine" (2015)

Music video
- "The Girl Is Mine" on YouTube

"The Girl Is Mine" is a song by British electronic music duo 99 Souls. A mash-up of Destiny's Child's "Girl" (2004) and Brandy and Monica's "The Boy Is Mine" (1998), the funky house track was released on 6 November 2015 with a re-recorded vocal from Brandy. The song peaked at number five on the UK Singles Chart, while also reaching the top ten in Ireland.

== Background ==
99 Souls, composed of UK-based producers Soul and Jo, spent around two to three months refining "The Girl Is Mine", creating roughly 60 different versions before settling on the final cut. The track, which samples from Destiny's Child's "Girl" (2004) and Brandy and Monica's "The Boy Is Mine" (1998), initially began as a promotional release to help the duo gain recognition and first appeared on SoundCloud in December 2014. Although 99 Souls initially expected little attention, the mash-up quickly gained popularity, amassing 2.9 million streams within its first year. It was eventually removed from the platform due to copyright issues.

Seeking clearance for a commercial release, the duo approached the original creators of both songs. Their track was well received, and all members of Destiny's Child approved; however, Beyoncé's father, Matthew Knowles, initially objected because it featured only his daughter's vocals. They maintained contact over several months and eventually secured his approval. A separate issue involved "The Boy Is Mine". The label required that one of their rappers also receive the track and offered £50,000 for a remix of another song, which did not fit the duo's plans. To resolve this, Brandy re-recorded the song, despite her Broadway commitments, completing the session in Los Angeles after careful scheduling. Though Brandy agreed to record new vocals for the mash-up track, Monica declined, stating that the original should be preserved to honor its historical significance and the personal memories associated with their Grammy Award win.

== Commercial performance ==
"The Girl Is Mine" experienced widespread commercial success, topping several international dance charts. It reached number one on Hungary's Dance Top 40, the UK Dance Chart, the US Dance Club Songs chart, and Mexico's Ingles Airplay chart. On mainstream charts, it peaked at number five on both the UK Singles Chart and the Scottish Singles Chart, number eight in Ireland, number 17 on Sweden's Heatseeker chart, and number 20 on the US Hot Dance/Electronic Songs chart. The song received multiple certifications for sales and streaming. It was certified Gold in Australia (35,000 units), Denmark (45,000 units), New Zealand (15,000 units), and Poland (10,000 units); 3× Platinum plus Gold in Mexico (210,000 units); and 2× Platinum in the United Kingdom (1,200,000 units).

== Music video ==
A music video for "The Girl Is Mine" was released on 99 Souls' Vevo account on 20 November 2015, and was directed by Sandl.

== Charts ==
=== Weekly charts ===
Weekly chart performance for "The Girl Is Mine"
Chart (2015–16)	Peak position
Australia (ARIA)	33
Belgium (Ultratip Bubbling Under Flanders)	5
Czech Republic Airplay (ČNS IFPI)	25
Hungary (Dance Top 40)	1
Hungary (Rádiós Top 40)	31
Hungary (Single Top 40)	24
Ireland (IRMA)	8
Mexico Ingles Airplay (Billboard)	1
Poland (Polish Airplay Top 100)	57
Scotland Singles (OCC)	5
Slovakia Airplay (ČNS IFPI)	38
Sweden Heatseeker (Sverigetopplistan)	17
UK Singles (OCC)	5
UK Dance (OCC)	1
US Dance Club Songs (Billboard)	1
US Hot Dance/Electronic Songs (Billboard)	20

=== Year-end charts ===
Year-end chart performance for "The Girl Is Mine"
Chart (2016)	Position
Hungary (Dance Top 40)	4
UK Singles (Official Charts Company)	59
US Dance Club Songs (Billboard)	38
US Hot Dance/Electronic Songs (Billboard)	78

== Certifications ==
Certifications for "The Girl Is Mine"
Region	Certification	Certified units/sales
Australia (ARIA)	Gold	35,000^{‡}
Denmark (IFPI Danmark)	Gold	45,000^{‡}
Mexico (AMPROFON)	3× Platinum+Gold	210,000^{‡}
New Zealand (RMNZ)	Gold	15,000^{‡}
Poland (ZPAV)	Gold	10,000^{‡}
United Kingdom (BPI)	2× Platinum	1,200,000^{‡}
^{‡} Sales+streaming figures based on certification alone.

== See also ==
- List of number-one dance singles of 2016 (U.S.)
