= Borderline (Brandy song) =

2020 song by Brandy

Single by Brandy

from the album B7
- Released: July 31, 2020
- Length: 5:12
- Label: Brand Nu; eOne
- Songwriters: Brandy Norwood; Darhyl "DJ" Camper; Kimberly "Kaydence" Krysiuk; Al Sherrod Lambert; Charles McAllister
- Producers: Norwood; LaShawn Daniels; DJ Camper

Brandy singles chronology
"Baby Mama" (2020)	"Borderline" (2020)	"No Tomorrow, Pt. 2" (2020)

Music video
- "Borderline" on YouTube

"Borderline" is a song by American singer Brandy Norwood. It was written by Norwood along with Darhyl "DJ" Camper, Kimberly "Kaydence" Krysiuk, Al Sherrod Lambert and Charles McAllister for her seventh studio album B7 (2020), with production handled by Norwood, Camper and LaShawn Daniels. Norwood's favorite song on the album, "Borderline" channels the song "Angel in Disguise" from her 1998 album Never Say Never. A dark and moody downtempo R&B ballad, it features Norwood voice over a ticking hi-hat. Lyrically, the song addresses borderline personality disorder at its emotional brink, examining the mental-health side effects of an unrequited love.

The song was generally praised by music critics who complimented its very sparse production and personal nature. Some of them also called it one of Norwood's finest vocal performances and cited it as the highlight of the record. "Borderline" was released by Brand Nu, Inc and eOne as the album's second single on July 31, 2020. It peaked at number 30 on the US R&B/Hip-Hop Airplay, also reaching number seven on the Adult R&B Songs chart. Norwood reteamed with Derek Blanks and Frank Gatson to produce a music video for the song which depicts her in a straitjacket. "Borderline" was part of Norwood's set list for her performances at the Billboard Music Awards and Soul Train Awards in 2020.

== Background ==
"Borderline" was written by Norwood, producer Darhyl "DJ" Camper, and songwriters Kimberly "Kaydence" Krysiuk, Al Sherrod Lambert, and Charles McAllister, while production was handled by Norwood, Camper, and LaShawn Daniels. The song is built upon ticking hi-hat pattern which Norwood described as a "magical, kind of a dark beat" that Camper had created for B7. After hearing the track, the singer felt motivated to write a song about an unrequited love that she had experienced. Lyrically, "Borderline" sees Norwood confront her own insecurities and weaknesses within relationships, with her professing to be "the most jealous girl" and ultimately illustrating the darker, emotional loneliness that can take over a romantic relationship. In an interview with the New York Post, she shared the story behind the song, "I loved someone that was not available to be loved by me, and so that drove me crazy," adding, "I wanted to use my music as a way to start more conversations about mental health and how that's something that we all need to work on every day." In an interview with The Grio, Norwood discussed her struggles with mental health, "I've dealt with depression in the most severe…like severe depression. I've dealt with trauma. I've dealt with PTSD. I've gone through a lot and I had to overcome a lot, but I had to overcome everything that I've overcame by doing the work," revealing that she had turned to therapy, prayer, journaling and meditation. In a June 2020 interview, Norwood remarked that "if another artist were to have that song, were to sing that song, I would wish that song was my song."

== Critical reception ==
"Borderline" was acclaimed by critics. Antwane Folk from Rated R&B called the song an "inescapable composition and the album's biggest song [...] Marked by ghost vocals, fine-tuned and stacked to perfection by the late LaShawn Daniels, Brandy's unhinged tone here is as complex as the cognitive disorder." Jennifer Gonsalves for MEA Worldwide wrote that the album felt "like an out-of-body experience, with Brandy's whispery vocals being the magic carpet that gently guides you through a journey from pain and loss to self-discovery and love," specifically picking out "Borderline" as "probably one of the best representations of this form of storytelling." Urban Bridgez also praised "Borderline", stating that Norwood was "showing her full vulnerability and truth on one track".

In his review for The Voice, Joel Campbell complimented the "hypnotic, downtempo groove" on "Borderline". Soul Bounce called the song a "standout", adding that the track would "definitely [be] going to get many repeat spins". Quentin Harrison for Albumism described the song as one of "three vibrant performances that will go down as some of Brandy's finest". Less impressed, Clash editor Robin Murray stated in his review for parent album B7 that "Boderline" was "no more than nice – pleasing on the ear, tugging at the heartstrings, but fail[s] to match the gravitational pull of the record's true highlights". AllMusic editor Andy Kellman ranked the song among the album's highlights along with "Rather Be", "Lucid Dreams", Borderline", "Say Something" and "Baby Mama".

== Music video ==
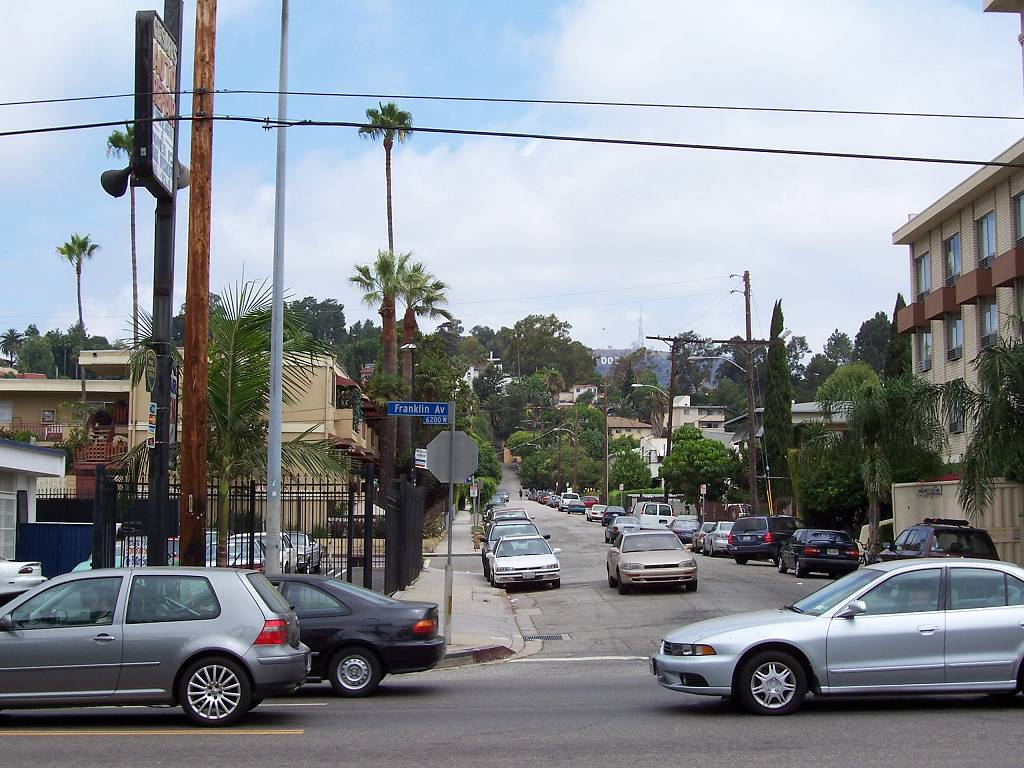
The music video for "Borderline" was filmed at Yucca Corridor in Hollywood, Los Angeles.

Norwood reteamed with Derek Blanks and Frank Gatson to produce a music video for "Borderline". Filming took place at the vintage-style Parlour Room bar at Yucca Street in the Hollywood neighborhood of Los Angeles, California in July 2020. Due to the ongoing COVID-19 pandemic in the United States, the video was shot socially-distanced, with a doctor on-set regularly testing people's temperatures. Norwood's friend Tasha Smith worked as her acting coach throughout the shoot. The nightclub scenes in the video were inspired by Diana Ross's portrayal of singer Billie Holiday in the biographical drama film Lady Sings the Blues (1972). The premiere of the video online coincided with B7's release on July 31, 2020.

The video sees Norwood performing "Borderline" in a nightclub, intercut by scenes in which she is forced into a straight-jacket and padded room, representing a psychiatric facility. Within these scenes, critics have suggested that Norwood has been stylised as Medusa, with her hair intended to depict the snakes for hair as is commonly portrayed within Greek mythology, illustrating the destructive power of jealousy and unhealthy thoughts as is consistent with the song's lyrics. The clip ends with a message showing support for all who need assistance in the US with regards to mental health issues. Norwood commented on the video that she "wanted to do a video that could show the change that I could make if I'm hurt or disturbed [...] I overcame that. I'm in a better space now."

== Live performances ==
Norwood sang along when the track was played as part of her Verzuz battle against fellow R&B singer Monica on August 31, 2020 at Tyler Perry Studios in Atlanta, Georgia. On October 14, 2020, she performed "Borderline" live for the first time as part of a medley, also consisting of her 1999 single "Almost Doesn't Count" and follow-up single "No Tomorrow (Part 2)" featuring rapper Ty Dolla Sign, at the Billboard Music Awards. Norwood's first performance at the awards ceremony since 1995, she performed without a live audience due to COVID-19 protocols, wearing black pants and a lacey white top with long jacket that critics compared to a "straightjacket". Norwood received generally positive reviews, with Stephen Daw from Billboard calling it "a stunning medley". In his review for TVLine's Andy Swift declared the performance a "triumphant return". On November 29, 2020, Norwood performed "Borderline" as a part of a medley at the 2020 Soul Train Music Awards, accompanied by her song "Say Something". It was her first performance at the Soul Train Music Awards since she received the Lady of Soul Award in 2016.

== Credits and personnel ==
Credits lifted from the liner notes of B7.

- Andy Barnes – engineer
- DJ Camper – producer, writer
- LaShawn Daniels – producer
- Kimberly "Kaydence" Krysiuk – writer
- Al Sherrod Lambert – writer
- Jaycen Joshua – mastering, mixing
- Charles McAllister – writer
- Brandy Norwood – producer, vocals, writer
- Earl "Ejay" Washington – engineer

== Charts ==
=== Weekly charts ===
Weekly chart performance for "Borderline"
Chart (2020)	Peak position
US R&B/Hip-Hop Airplay (Billboard)	30

=== Year-end charts ===
2020 year-end chart performance for "Borderline"
Chart (2020)	Position
US Adult R&B Songs (Billboard)	43

2021 year-end chart performance for "Borderline"
Chart (2021)	Position
US Adult R&B Songs (Billboard)	41

== Release history ==
"Borderline" release history
Region	Date	Format	Label	Ref.
Various	July 31, 2020	Digital download; streaming	Brand Nu, Inc.; eOne	
