= Darhyl Camper =

American singer-songwriter and record producer

Darhyl "DJ" Camper
- Also known as: DJ Camper; Hey DJ; Camper
- Born: May 25, 1990 (age 36); Atlantic City, New Jersey, U.S.
- Genres: R&B; hip-hop
- Occupations: Record producer; rapper; singer; songwriter; disc jockey

Darhyl "DJ" Camper Jr. (born May 25, 1990), also known by his stage name Camper, is an American singer-songwriter, rapper and record producer.

== Career ==
Camper was born May 25, 1990, in Atlantic City, New Jersey. At the age of six, he began playing the piano. Raised in the Mays Landing section of Hamilton Township, Atlantic County, New Jersey, Camper graduated from Oakcrest High School in 2008.

In 2011 Camper, co-produced the Big Sean single "Marvin & Chardonnay" which reached number one on the US Billboard Hot R&B/Hip-Hop Songs. In 2012, he received a Grammy Award nomination for co-producing singer Elle Varner's "Refill." Subsequently, Camper worked with artists such as Tamar Braxton, John Legend, Nicki Minaj, and Jay-Z. In 2017, Camper collaborated with Mary J. Blige on her single "Thick of It" which topped the US Adult R&B Songs chart. The following year, he executive produced on English singer Jessie J’s album R.O.S.E.. In 2019, Brandy consulted Camper to executive produce her album B7.

Camper has been a resident of New Brunswick, New Jersey.

On January 23, 2026, Camper released him first album, Campilation

== Songwriting & production credits ==
Year	Song	Artist	Album
2012	"Trust and Believe"	Keyshia Cole	Woman To Woman
2012	"Refill"	Elle Varner	Perfectly Imperfect
2012	"Pretty Girl's Lie"	Trey Songz	Chapter V
2013	"Fire"	Big Sean	Hall of Fame
2013	"Guap"	Big Sean	Hall of Fame
2013	"Love and War"	Tamar Braxton	Love and War
2013	"Open Your Eyes"	John Legend	Love in the Future
2013	"Dreams"	John Legend	Love in the Future
2013	"Angel (Interlude)" (Featuring Stacy Barthe)	John Legend	Love in the Future
2014	"Dedicated" (feat. Nas)	Mariah Carey	Me. I Am Mariah... The Elusive Chanteuse
2014	"Self Love"	Mary J. Blige	Think Like A Man Too
2014	"Lady In A Glass Dress"	Chris Brown	X
2014	"Flawed Beautiful Creatures (Summer Version)"	Stacy Barthe	BEcoming
2015	"Me Versus Me"	Stacy Barthe	BEcoming
2015	"Whatever"	Lalah Hathaway	Lalah Hathaway Live!
2015	"Raise the Bar"	Tamar Braxton	Calling All Lovers
2015	"Integrity" (Featuring Charisse Mills)	Ne-Yo	Non-Fiction
2015	"Make It Easy"	Ne-Yo	Non-Fiction
2016	"Already Knew That"	Ro James	Eldorado
2016	"Focus"	H.E.R.	H.E.R., Vol. 1
2017	"Love Yourself"	Mary J. Blige	Strength of a Woman
2017	"Set Me Free"	Mary J. Blige	Strength of a Woman
2017	"Thick of It"	Mary J. Blige	Strength of a Woman
2017	"Alert"	K. Michelle	Kimberly: The People I Used to Know
2017	"Kim K"	K. Michelle	Kimberly: The People I Used to Know
2017	"Jump Out the Window"	Big Sean	I Decided
2018	"Good Man"	Ne-Yo	Good Man
2018	"Apology"	Ne-Yo	Good Man
2018	"Real Deal"	Jessie J	R.O.S.E.
2018	"Think About That"	Jessie J	R.O.S.E.
2018	"Oh Lord"	Jessie J	R.O.S.E.
2018	"Dopamine"	Jessie J	R.O.S.E.
2018	"Easy On Me"	Jessie J	R.O.S.E.
2018	"Petty"	Jessie J	R.O.S.E.
2018	"Not My Ex"	Jessie J	R.O.S.E.
2018	"Four Letter Word"	Jessie J	R.O.S.E.
2018	"Queen"	Jessie J	R.O.S.E.
2018	"One Night Lover"	Jessie J	R.O.S.E.
2018	"Dangerous"	Jessie J	R.O.S.E.
2018	"Glory"	Jessie J	R.O.S.E.
2018	"Rose Challenge"	Jessie J	R.O.S.E.
2018	"Someone's Lady"	Jessie J	R.O.S.E.
2018	"I Believe in Love"	Jessie J	R.O.S.E.
2019	"Love Again"	Daniel Caesar & Brandy	Case Study 01 & B7
2020	"Saving All My Love"	Brandy	B7
2020	"Unconditional Oceans"	Brandy	B7
2020	"Rather Be"	Brandy	B7
2020	"Lucid Dreams"	Brandy	B7
2020	"Borderline"	Brandy	B7
2020	"No Tomorrow"	Brandy	B7
2020	"Say Something"	Brandy	B7
2020	"I Am More"	Brandy	B7
2020	"High Heels" (with Sy'rai)	Brandy	B7
2020	"Bye BiPolar"	Brandy	B7
2020	"All My Life" (Pts. 1, 2 & 3)	Brandy	B7
2020	"Still I Rise" (Featuring Dom Kennedy)	Big Sean	Detroit 2
2020	"Always"	John Legend	Bigger Love
2023	"Somebody's Waiting"	Brandy	Christmas with Brandy
2024	"Stars"	¥$ (Kanye West and Ty Dolla Sign)	Vultures 1
2024	"Talking / Once Again"	¥$ (Kanye West and Ty Dolla Sign)	Vultures 1
2024	"Hoodrat"	¥$ (Kanye West and Ty Dolla Sign)	Vultures 1
2024	"Do It"	¥$ (Kanye West and Ty Dolla Sign)	Vultures 1
2024	"Problematic"	¥$ (Kanye West and Ty Dolla Sign)	Vultures 1
2024	"Acknowledge Me"	Doja Cat	Scarlet 2 Claude
2024	"Sucia" (featuring Jill Scott and Young Miko)	Kehlani	Crash
2024	"Vegas"	Kehlani	Crash
2024	"My Soul"	¥$	Vultures 2
2024	"Boom Bap"	Doechii	Alligator Bites Never Heal
2024	"Soft"	FLO	Access All Areas
2024	"Bending My Rules"	FLO	Access All Areas
2026	"Overdramatic"	Tinashe	Popstar

== Guest appearances ==
List of guest appearances, with other performing artists, showing year released and album name
Title	Year	Other performer(s)	Album
"I'm Ready"	2020	John Legend	Bigger Love
