= Beggin & Pleadin =

Single by Brandy
- Released: January 21, 2016
- Recorded: 2015
- Genre: Blues; trap
- Length: 2:48
- Label: Slayana
- Songwriters: Ronald Colson; Warren "Oak" Felder; John Lee Hooker; Kirby Lauryen; Steve Mostyn; Brandy Norwood; Andrew "Pop" Wansel
- Producers: Pop & Oak; Flippa; Mostyn

Brandy singles chronology
"The Girl Is Mine" (2015)	"Beggin & Pleadin" (2016)	"Optimistic" (2018)

Music video
- "Beggin & Pleadin" on YouTube

"Beggin & Pleadin" is song by American recording artist Brandy. It was written by Ronald Colson, Warren "Oak" Felder, Kirby Lauryen, Steve Mostyn, Andrew "Pop" Wansel, and Brandy, while production was helmed by Pop & Oak, Mostyn, and Colson. "Beggin & Pleadin'" is influenced by 1950s blues, particularly the music of Ray Charles. The song is unconventionally built on a modern trap beat, and samples John Lee Hooker's song "Boom Boom". Autobiographical in nature, the lyrics are a point of view account of a female protagonist, who sings cathartically about her mercurial temperament, following an inflammatory argument with her fiancé.

"Beggin & Pleadin" was generally praised by music critics who complimented Brandy's vocals as well as the progressive elements and retro sound of the song. Not initially intended to be a marketed single, it was eventually released independently by Brandy, to coincide with the premiere of her BET television sitcom Zoe Ever After in January 2016. "Beggin & Pleadin" performed moderately on charts, peaking atop the US Billboard Blues Digital Songs chart. The single's accompanying music video was directed by Mike Ho and inspired by actress Margaret Avery's appearance as blues singer Shug Avery in Steven Spielberg's period drama The Color Purple (1985).

== Background ==
In August 2012, Norwood released the single "Wildest Dreams", her final single from her sixth studio album Two Eleven. It reached number 68 on the US Billboard Hot R&B/Hip-Hop Songs. Soon after, during The BET Honors in February 2013, "Without You" was introduced as Norwood's new single and she performed the song live for the first time. It remained unreleased however. Promotion for Two Eleven from RCA Records ended shortly after its release. However, Norwood continued to do spot-date performances in the US, Japan, and London throughout 2013. She also continued acting, starring in BET's The Game for five seasons, as well as the feature film Temptation: Confessions of a Marriage Counselor. In 2014, Norwood released a rerecorded version of Coldplay's song "Magic" to her TwitMusic account; it peaked at number one on Billboard's Trending 140 chart.

After finishing the filming of the final season of The Game, Norwood made her Broadway debut in the musical Chicago, where she played the lead role of Roxie Hart, beginning in April 2015. Although initially a six-week run, her engagement was extended until August 2015. In January 2016, Norwood debuted her new sitcom Zoe Ever After, which she stars and co-produces.

== Conception and release ==
"Beggin & Pleadin" was written by Norwood, Ronald "Flippa" Colson, Warren "Oak" Felder, Kirby Lauryen, Steve Mostyn, and Andrew "Pop" Wansel. Production on the song was handled by Colson and Mostyn as well as Felder and Wansel under their production team name Pop & Oak. The track heavily samples "Boom Boom" by John Lee Hooker. Recorded in December 2015, "Beggin & Pleadin" was conceived during an unconventional but creative brainstorm session with Pop & Oak and their frequent collaborators. While the team discussed several ideas with Norwood, her wish to record a song with old school vibes and a heavy "dope ass beat," prompted Oak to come up with an original drumbeat. He then added the electric guitar and acoustics as well as the repetitive "good God almighty" sample. Norwood later free-styled some of the lines of the chorus in the recording booth, before Lauryen started writing some of the additional lyrics. Speaking about how "Beggin & Pleadin" materialized, Norwood later recalled recording her vocals as rather challenging because she was required to abandon her natural contralto register in favor of a higher vocal range: "I’m not really a soprano", she said. "I can fake it sometimes if I have a good lozenge or two, but it was a very challenging vocal. I pulled it from the bottom of my core, and that was an experience for me. It was very emotional but I managed to just push through. If that was the last vocal for me ever, I would be proud and OK with that."

On January 5, 2016, Norwood released "Beggin & Pleadin" for free streaming on her SoundCloud account, which coincided with the premiere of her romantic comedy television series Zoe Ever After on the BET channel. Norwood also took to Facebook and Twitter to thank her collaborators and preview several clips of the track. While the song was originally not intended for a single release rather than a promotional buzz track surrounding her comeback as a leading actress, social media and word-of-mouth promotion led to more than 150,000 streams within 48 hours. A week later, Norwood announced that "Beggin & Pleadin" would serve as her first single "back into the music scene". It was eventually released as a digital single on January 20, and was given a satellite radio release on February 10, 2016.

== Composition ==
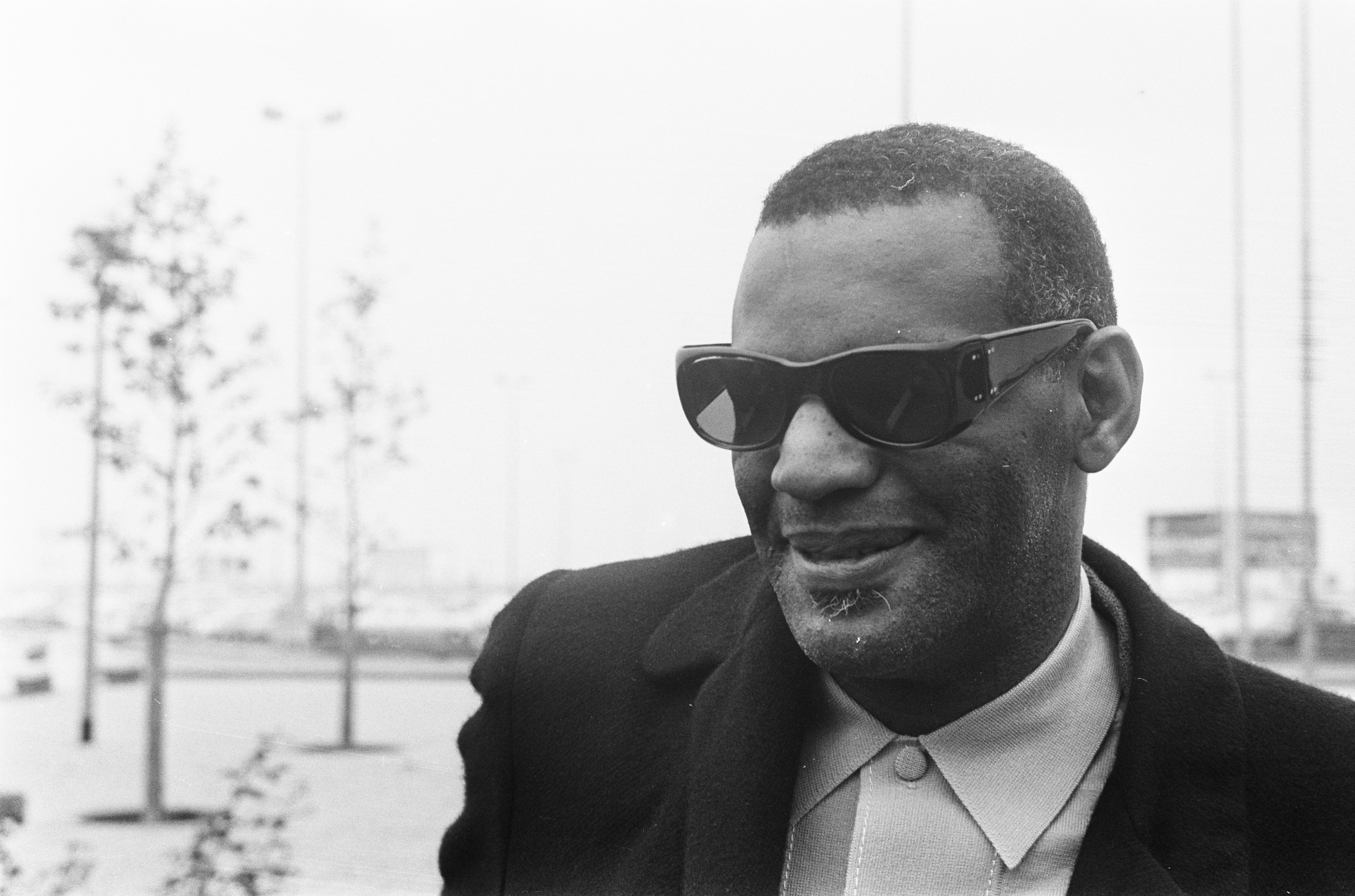
Norwood cited Ray Charles's "Night Time Is the Right Time" as a major inspiration on "Beggin & Pleadin."

"Beggin & Pleadin" is a midtempo R&B song, which Norwood has dubbed as “trap-blues,” a combination of modern trap music sounds and traditional blues. The instrumentation includes electric guitars, bass drums, and a piano. Norwood described the track as a "Ray Charles, Tina Turner-ish" throwback, whose sound was inspired by a scene in Taylor Hackford's musical biographical film Ray (2004), in which actor Jamie Foxx performs Charles's 1958 version of the Nappy Brown song "Night Time Is the Right Time" along with Charles's backing singers, The Raelettes. GlobalGrind's Brittany Lewis wrote that the song was reminiscent of backwoods negro spirituals, while Elias Leight from The Fader found that "Beggin & Pleadin" sounds like it was sampled from an old blues song, particularly a variation on John Lee Hooker's "Boom Boom." Vulture noted that "Beggin & Pleadin" harks back to Norwood's Mississippi origin.

Lyrically, "Beggin & Pleadin" sees its protagonist mourning a lost love. Based on a real-life experience and the lesson it taught her, the song was inspired by Norwood's broken engagement to music executive Ryan Press, from whom she separated in early 2014 after a three-year relationship. The dissolution left Norwood exhausted and saddened, but also encouraged her to explore new avenues in her career, including her starring role as Roxie Hart in the Broadway musical Chicago, her new television comedy show Zoe Ever After and the recording of new music. Songwriter Kirby Lauryen crafted the song after Norwood shared the pain of not having truly dealt with the reasons behind the break-up. “I told her my story, just a bit about what I experienced and how I went through a really tough period, and how I wasn't able to just let it go and get over it,” the singer explained to Billboard magazine. Following its release, she also took to Facebook to elaborate on the liberating nature of the song's lyrics: "As I grew through the subject matter of this song, I realized that I needed me to forgive me for not believing what I felt," she wrote.

== Critical reception ==
"Beggin & Pleadin" received universal praise from music critics. Vulture writer Dee Lockett felt that "Beggin & Pleadin" sounded like "if Hit-Boy remixed "Hit the Road Jack". The song "is grounded in the blues, but, Brandy being Brandy, she's chopped and screwed it with a bit of modern trap that surprisingly doesn't sound tacky [...] Brandy's the kind of underrated vocalist who shape-shifts to fit into all of music's many pockets with ease." Slate magazine writer Laura Bradley wrote that Norwood's "powerful voice is at its best in "Beggin & Pleadin," which bubbles with bluesy emotion and syncopated tension." Vannessa Jackson from Bustle magazine noted that "Beggin & Pleadin" signalled a "different sound for the artist", offering "a lot more of a bluesy and soulful feel than her previous music — and it's amazing."

Jaleesa M. Jones from USA Today felt the song sounded like a ‘40s-era, juke-joint-in-the-middle-of-the-Louisiana-bayou bastion of R&B goodness. The Verge author Jamieson Cox considered "Beggin & Pleadin" a "grainy, lusty bit of blues that perfectly suits her rusty alto," further writing that the song it "might take you by surprise. R&B doesn't get much more rough or wounded." Writing for Billboard magazine, Adelle Platon rated "Beggin & Pleadin" three-and-a-half stars out of five. The song has also been praised by musicians such as Erica Campbell, Missy Elliott, Jessie J, Lil' Mo, Monica, LeAnn Rimes, B. Slade, Sam Smith, JoJo, and Tyrese Gibson.

== Music video ==
The accompanying music video for "Beggin & Pleadin" premiered on BET Soul on April 15, 2016, and was directed by Mike Ho. Norwood's first video in four years, filming took place in New Orleans on March 7, 2016. In the video, Norwood visits a night club and performs there with her live band and back-up singers while everyone in the room dances around them. Wearing a sparkly fire-red dress with sequined embellishments and a decorative white headdress, critics cited her appearance in the video as an homage to Shug Avery, a character in Steven Spielberg's period drama The Color Purple, who wears a similar outfit in a prominent juke joint sequence in the film.

== Chart performance ==
Upon its SoundCloud release, "Beggin & Pleadin" reached number two on Billboard's Trending 140 chart within a few hours. The week following its official release to digital media stores, it debuted at number 17 on Billboard's R&B Digital Songs chart and reached the top of the Blues Digital Songs, where it remained for 12 consecutive weeks.

=== Weekly charts ===
Chart (2016)	Peak position
US Blues Digital Songs (Billboard)	1
US R&B Digital Songs (Billboard)	17
