= Case Study 01 =

Studio album by Daniel Caesar
- Released: June 28, 2019
- Recorded: 2018–2019
- Studio: Shangri-La Recording, Henson Recording, Brandon's Way Recording (California); Abbey Road, Metropolis (London); An Airbnb; The Cube (Toronto, Canada); Conway Recording (Hollywood, California); Paramount (Los Angeles)
- Genre: R&B
- Length: 43:01
- Label: Golden Child
- Producer: Jordan Evans; Matthew Burnett; Daniel Caesar; Alex Ernewein; Boi-1da; Ethan “SPYDER” Ashby; John Mayer; River Tiber; The Neptunes

Daniel Caesar chronology
Freudian (2017)	Case Study 01 (2019)	Never Enough (2023)

Singles from Case Study 01
- 1. "Love Again" Released: July 5, 2019

Case Study 01 (stylized in all caps) is the second studio album by Canadian singer and songwriter Daniel Caesar, released on June 28, 2019, through Golden Child Recordings. It features guest appearances from Brandy, Pharrell Williams, John Mayer, Sean Leon and Jacob Collier.

== Promotion ==
Caesar held a listening party in Los Angeles in the week leading up to the album's release. Along with invited music industry figures, the event was also open to the first 200 guests that arrived. Caesar also teased the album on social media, including with a video of a person walking across a desert set to a "muted keyboard melody" and a quote from scientist J. Robert Oppenheimer.

== Critical reception ==
Professional ratings
Review scores
Source	Rating
Exclaim!	8/10
Highsnobiety	3.0/5
Pitchfork	6.7/10

Jacob Carey of Exclaim! noted the "experimental nature" of the album, concluding: "Although Case Study 01 may not receive the same critical reception as Freudian, it's a solid effort by an artist who is, more or less, still a rookie, attempting to diversify his sound early on in order to avoid cementing himself into gospel music for the entirety of his career." Aaron Williams of Uproxx stated: "Even with Caesar's newfound physicality, Case Study 01 is still a thoughtful, beautiful-sounding album. If nothing else, it proves he's still a smart, intriguing songwriter who could wring twice as much romance out of a couplet as any of his contemporaries. But there's also a sense that maybe he's trying a little too hard here as well."

The album was longlisted for the 2020 Polaris Music Prize.

== Track listing ==
No.	Title	Writer(s)	Producer(s)	Length
1.	"Entropy"	Ashton Simmonds; Tommy Paxton-Beesley; Andrew Cocup; Tom Findlay; Allan Jeffrey; Claire Rothrock	Daniel Caesar	4:21
2.	"Cyanide"	Simmonds; Paxton-Beesley; Jason Harrow; Matthew Burnett; Jordan Evans; Matthew Leon; Thomas Jackson; Robert King	Burnett; Evans	3:14
3.	"Love Again" (with Brandy)	Simmonds; Brandy; Evans; Burnett; Leon; Darhyl Camper, Jr.; Edward Blackmon	Evans; Burnett	3:34
4.	"Frontal Lobe Muzik" (featuring Pharrell Williams)	Simmonds; Pharrell Williams; Chad Hugo; Leon; Evans; Burnett	The Neptunes	3:49
5.	"Open Up"	Simmonds; Paxton-Beesley; Evans; Burnett; Leon	Burnett; Evans	4:26
6.	"Restore the Feeling" (featuring Sean Leon and Jacob Collier)	Simmonds; Evans; Burnett; Leon; Jacob Collier	Evans; Burnett	3:34
7.	"Superposition" (featuring John Mayer)	Simmonds; Evans; Paxton-Beesley; Burnett; John Mayer	Mayer; Evans^{[a]}	4:23
8.	"Too Deep to Turn Back"	Simmonds; Paxton-Beesley; Evans; Burnett; Cocup; Findlay; Jeffrey; Rothrock; Milton Yakus	Burnett; Evans; River Tiber^{[a]}	5:18
9.	"Complexities"	Leon; Alex Ernewein; Ethan “SPYDER” Ashby; Liza Yohannes; Liam Mitro	Ernwein; Ashby^{[a]}	3:50
10.	"Are You OK?"	Simmonds; Paxton-Beesley; Leon; Mayer; Matthew Samuels	Daniel Caesar; Boi-1da; River Tiber^{[a]}	6:32
Total length:				43:01

Notes

- All track titles are stylized in all caps
- ^{^[a]} signifies an additional producer
- "Cyanide" contains additional vocals by River Tiber and Kardinal Offishall
- "Entropy" and "Frontal Lobe Muzik" contains additional vocals by Sean Leon
- "Too Deep to Turn Back" contains additional vocals by Arainna Reid
- "Complexities" contains additional vocals by Liza Yohannes

Sample credits

- "Cyanide" contains samples from "Candy Maker", performed by Tommy James and the Shondells.
- "Entropy" and "Too Deep to Turn Back" contains a sample from "At the River" as performed by Groove Armada, written by Andrew Cocup and Tom Findlay.

== Personnel ==
Credits adapted from Daniel Caesar's Instagram.

Musicians

- Daniel Caesar – production ("Entropy", "Are You OK?"); recording, programming ("Entropy")
- Alex Ernewein – production ("Complexities")
- Arianna Reid – additional vocals ("Too Deep to Turn Back")
- Boi-1da – production ("Are You OK?")
- DJ Camper – additional keys ("Love Again")
- Ethan “SPYDER” Ashby – additional production ("Complexities")
- John Mayer – production, additional vocals ("Superposition"); electric guitar ("Are You OK?")
- Jordan Evans – production ("Cyanide", "Love Again", "Open Up", "Restore the Feeling", "Too Deep to Turn Back"); additional production, drums ("Superposition")
- Kardinal Offishall – additional vocals ("Cyanide")
- Liam Mitro – saxophone, flute ("Complexities")
- Liza Yohannes – additional vocals ("Complexities")
- Matthew Burnett – production ("Cyanide", "Love Again", "Open Up", "Restore the Feeling", "Too Deep to Turn Back"); electric bass ("Frontal Lobe Muzik")
- River Tiber – additional vocals ("Entropy", "Cyanide"), additional production ("Too Deep to Turn Back", "Are You OK?"), recording ("Complexities"), strings ("Superposition"); additional music ("Entropy")
- Sean Leon – additional vocals ("Entropy", "Frontal Lobe Muzik")
- The Neptunes – production ("Frontal Lobe Muzik")

Technical

- Alex Ernewein – recording ("Complexities")
- Ben "Bengineer" Sedano – assistant recording ("Frontal Lobe Muzik")
- Chad Franscoviak – recording ("Superposition")
- Gabriel Placentia – assistant recording ("Love Again")
- Jordan Evans – recording ("Entropy", "Cyanide", "Love Again", "Frontal Lobe Muzik", "Open Up", "Restore the Feeling"), additional drum programming ("Frontal Lobe Muzik"), programming ("Love Again")
- Matthew Burnett – programming ("Love Again")
- Mikalai Skrobat – ("Frontal Lobe Muzik")
- Mike Larson – recording ("Frontal Lobe Muzik")
- Morning Estrada – recording ("Love Again")
- Paul Boutin – recording ("Love Again")
- Riley Bell – mixing, mastering (all tracks); recording ("Cyanide", "Frontal Lobe Muzik", "Open Up", "Too Deep to Turn Back", "Restore the Feeling")
- Rob Bisel – recording ("Are You OK?")

== Charts ==
Chart (2019)	Peak position
Australian Albums (ARIA)	26
Belgian Albums (Ultratop Flanders)	186
Canadian Albums (Billboard)	6
Dutch Albums (Album Top 100)	39
Lithuanian Albums (AGATA)	57
UK Albums (OCC)	89
US Billboard 200	17

== Certifications ==
Region	Certification	Certified units/sales
Canada (Music Canada)	Gold	40,000^{‡}
^{‡} Sales+streaming figures based on certification alone.
