= Baby Mama (Brandy song) =

2020 song by Brandy featuring Chance the Rapper

Single by Brandy featuring Chance the Rapper

from the album B7
- Released: May 1, 2020
- Studio: NRG Recording Studios (North Hollywood, CA)
- Genre: R&B
- Length: 3:18
- Label: Brand Nu; eOne
- Songwriters: Brandy Norwood; Kimberley Krysiuk; Akil King; Chancelor Bennett; Chauncey Alexander "Hit-Boy" Hollis; Sy'rai Smith
- Producers: Hit-Boy; Brandy; LaShawn Daniels

Brandy singles chronology
"Freedom Rings" (2019)	"Baby Mama" (2020)	"Borderline" (2020)

Chance the Rapper singles chronology
"Hot Shower" (2019)	"Baby Mama" (2020)	"Holy" (2020)

Music video
- "Baby Mama" on YouTube

"Baby Mama" is a song recorded by the American singer Brandy, featuring rapper Chance the Rapper. It was written by Brandy, Chance, Akil King, and Kimberly "Kaydence" Krysiuk for her seventh album B7 (2020), while production was helmed by Hit Boy and Brandy along with LaShawn Daniels. Built upon a bass-heavy, horn-led beat and a joyful melody, the R&B track is a Mother's Day anthem that pays homage to single mothers, while also celebrating Brandy's love for daughter Sy'rai.

The song was released by Brandy's own label Brand Nu, Inc. and eOne Music as the album's lead single on May 1, 2020. It earned largely positive reviews from music critics who praised its lyrical message and colorful nature and peaked at number 27 on the US R&B/Hip-Hop Airplay. "Baby Mama" also reached the top ten of Billboard's Adult R&B Songs chart and the Deutsche Urban Charts in Germany. A music video for the song was directed by Derek Blanks and longtime contributor Frank Gatson Jr.

== Background ==
"Baby Mama" was written by Brandy, Chance the Rapper, Akil King, and Kimberly "Kaydence" Krysiuk, and produced by the former along with Hit Boy and LaShawn Daniels for seventh studio album B7 (2020). Recorded toward the end of the album-making process, Brandy enlisted Chance the Rapper after they had connected when he reached out about sampling a portion of her 1994 song "I Wanna Be Down" on his song "Ballin Flossin" from his 2019 album The Big Day. Commenting on their collaboration, Brandy noted: "Chance is a mother lover, he’s all about his family, his daughter, and I just thought that it would just be cool for him to jump on it, because it’s such an upbeat fun song. And he got on it and killed it. Okay, he did his thing on it. I was so impressed with what he was able to say and his lyrics were just phenomenal.

Lyrically, the song has the singer detailing her love for her daughter Sy’rai over a "horn-heavy beat, celebrating the teen’s talents and ability to shine." Rolling Stone noted that the song equally served as "an ode to [Brandy's] own independence and hard work," while Brandy herself called the song as "Mother's Day" anthem as well as a celebration of her daughter and to "all moms who are doing the same thing," serving as a somewhat tribute to hardworking mothers across the world. She further elaborated that she "wanted to do a song about [Sy'rai] and speak to all baby mamas out there that may feel like they can’t make it or they can’t push through, you know, if you use your child as an inspiration you can do anything and I want to everybody to feel that." On May 2, 2020, singer Kehlani took to Twitter to confirm that a yet-unreleased version featuring her vocals exists.

== Critical reception ==
"Baby Mama" earned largely positive reviews from music critics. Brittany Spanos, writing for Rolling Stone, described the song as "joyful from the jump," while Stephen Kearse from Pitchfork praised the "colorful and springy arrangements" on "Baby Mama." He found that "Hit-Boy’s horn loop [...] is so bouncy that the song sways even when the percussion drops out." Clash editor Robin Murray called the song a "fierce return," that was an "ultra-catchy slice of R&B" as well as "itchily infectious." Vulture's news editor Zoe Haylock, noted that "Baby Mama" was "a Mother’s Day anthem just in time to remind you that it’s Mother’s Day on May 10. That’s enough time to mentally prepare for a phone call, send a thoughtful gift over, or dedicate Brandy’s new song "Baby Mama" to the mother figures in your life."

== Chart performance ==
"Baby Mama" was officially announced as the lead single from B7 on American talk show, The Talk in March 2020. While the song's release was postponed due to the COVID-19 pandemic, it was officially released digitally on May 1, 2020. The song debuted at number 23 on the US Billboard Adult R&B Songs in the week ending May 9, 2020 and eventually going on to peak at number seven on July 20, 2020. This marked her first list entry as a leading artist since "Wildest Dreams" in 2012. In addition, it reached number 27 on the R&B/Hip-Hop Airplay chart. On May 16, 2020, the single entered and peaked on Billboard's R&B Digital Song Sales chart at number 10, making it Brandy's fifth entry on that chart. Elsewhere, on the week ending June 22, 2020, the single peaked at number 44 on the US Urban Airplay chart.

== Music video ==
=== Background and release ===
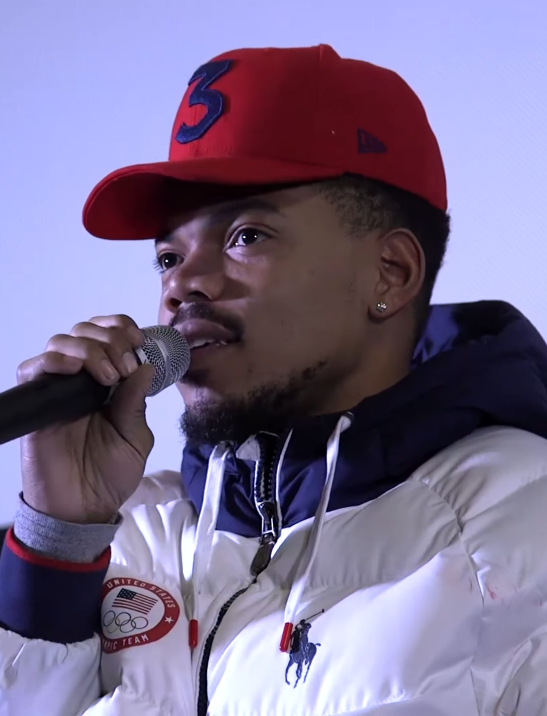
Chance the Rapper co-stars in the video for "Baby Mama."

An accompanying music video was directed by Derek Blanks and Frank Gatson Jr., the latter of whom Brandy had frequently collaborated with throughout her career, including videos for "I Wanna Be Down" (1994) and "Put It Down" (2012). "Baby Mama" was filmed at the Fat Eye Studios in Los Angeles in the week of January 29, 2020, prior to social distancing and the COVID-19 pandemic. Next to Brandy and Chance girl group June's Diary appear as backing dancers in the video. It premiered on BET outlets on May 4, 2020, and uploaded online soon after.

=== Synopsis ===
The video draws inspiration from Fosse-style choreography and the 1969 musical film Sweet Charity, specifically from actor Sammy Davis Jr. performance of the song "The Rhythm of Life". The video opens with Brandy and her dancers in an open warehouse surrounded by classic cars. Donning an array of colorful suits and jackets, Brandy performs a series of dance sequences with the dancers, fusing contemporary jazz and hip-hop stylings. Chance the Rapper appears in the video, interacting with Brandy through an orange two-seater. Vulture noted that the visuals feature Brandy and a "dozens of friends dancing in the street."

== Live performances ==
Brandy first performed the song live on Good Morning America during their 2020 Spring Concert Series. She live streamed her performance from her home due to the COVID-19 pandemic. Brandy live-streamed a performance of the song on The Talk on May 12, 2020.

== Credits and personnel ==
Credits taken from the liner notes of B7.

- Andy Barnes – engineer
- Chancelor Bennett – vocals, writer
- LaShawn Daniels – producer
- Antonio Dixon – engineer
- Chauncey Alexander "Hit-Boy" Hollis – producer, writer
- Jaycen Joshua – mastering, mixing
- Akil King – writer
- Kimberley Krysiuk – writer
- Brandy Norwood – producer, vocals, writer
- Sy'rai Smith – background vocals, writer
- Earl "Ejay" Washington – engineer

== Charts ==
=== Weekly charts ===
Weekly chart performance for "Baby Mama"
Chart (2020)	Peak position
Germany (Deutsche Urban Charts)	9
US R&B Digital Song Sales (Billboard)	10
US R&B/Hip-Hop Airplay (Billboard)	27

=== Year-end charts ===
Year-end chart performance for "Baby Mama"
Chart (2020)	Position
Germany (Deutsche Urban Charts)	80
US Adult R&B Songs (Billboard)	33

== Release history ==
"Baby Mama" release history
Region	Date	Format	Label	Ref.
Various	May 1, 2020	Digital download; streaming	Brand Nu, Inc.; eOne	
