= Brandy filmography =

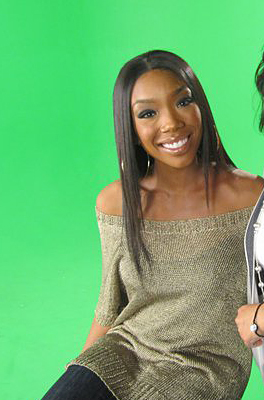
Brandy filming for her reality show Brandy & Ray J: A Family Business, 2011

As an actress, Brandy Norwood has appeared in feature films and television shows. She made her television debut in 1993 in the ABC sitcom Thea, as the daughter of a single mother (Thea Vidale). Broadcast to low ratings, the series ran for only one season, but earned her a Young Artists Award nomination for Outstanding Youth Ensemble alongside her co-stars. In 1996, her short-lived engagement on Thea led Brandy to star in her own show, the UPN-produced sitcom Moesha, in which she played the title role of Moesha Mitchell, a Los Angeles girl coping with a stepmother as well as the pressures and demands of becoming an adult. The program debuted on UPN in January 1996, and soon became their most-watched show. The network decided to cancel the show after six seasons on the air, leaving it ending with a cliffhanger for a scrapped seventh season. Brandy was awarded an NAACP Image Award for her performance. In 1997, Brandy was hand-picked by producer Whitney Houston to play the title character in Rodgers and Hammerstein's television version of Cinderella featuring a multicultural cast that also included Jason Alexander, Whoopi Goldberg, and Houston. The two-hour Wonderful World of Disney special garnered an estimated 60 million viewers, giving the network its highest ratings in the time period in 16 years, and won an Emmy Award the following year.

After backing out of a role in F. Gary Gray's 1996 film Set It Off, Brandy made her big screen debut in the supporting role of Karla Wilson in the slasher film, I Still Know What You Did Last Summer. The movie outperformed the original with a total of $16.5 million at its opening weekend, but critical reaction to the film was largely disappointing. Brandy, however, earned positive reviews for her "bouncy" performance, which garnered her both a Blockbuster Entertainment Award and an MTV Movie Award nomination. In 1999, she co-starred with Diana Ross in the telefilm drama Double Platinum about an intense, strained relationship between a mother and daughter. Shot in only twenty days in New York City, both Brandy and Ross served as executive producers of the movie. In June 2006 Brandy was cast as one of three talent judges on the first season of America's Got Talent, an amateur talent contest on NBC executive-produced by Simon Cowell and hosted by Regis Philbin. The broadcast was one of the most-watched programs of the summer, and concluded on August 17, 2006 with the win of 11-year-old singer Bianca Ryan. She was replaced by reality TV star Sharon Osbourne.

In April 2010, Brandy and Ray J debuted in the VH1 reality series Brandy and Ray J: A Family Business along with their parents. The show chronicled the backstage lives of both siblings, while taking on larger roles in their family's management and production company, R&B Productions. Executive produced by the Norwood family, the season concluded after eleven episodes, and was renewed for a second season, which began broadcasting in fall 2010. In fall 2010, Brandy appeared as a contestant on season 11 of the ABC reality show Dancing with the Stars, partnered with Maksim Chmerkovskiy. She ultimately placed fourth in the competition, which was a shock to the judges, viewers, studio audience, and other contestants that considered her one of the show's frontrunners throughout the entire competition. In August 2011, it was confirmed that Norwood had signed a joint record deal with RCA Records and producer Breyon Prescott's Chameleon Records. In September, a new talent show, Majors & Minors, created by musician Evan Bogart, premiered on The Hub. It followed a group of young performers age 10–16 and their chance to be mentored by some established artists such as Brandy, Ryan Tedder and Leona Lewis. Later that same year, Brandy returned to acting roles with recurring appearances on The CW's teen drama series 90210, and in the fourth season of the Lifetime's comedy series Drop Dead Diva, in which she played the role of Elisa Shayne. In March 2013, Brandy returned to the big screen starring alongside an ensemble cast consisting of Jurnee Smollett-Bell, Lance Gross and Vanessa L. Williams in Tyler Perry's dramatic film Temptation: Confessions of a Marriage Counselor. Brandy plays Melinda, a woman with a few secrets running from her past. The film received generally negative reviews from film critics.

In January 2016, Norwood starred as the lead in the BET sitcom Zoe Ever After, which she also co-created and co-executive produced. Filmed in Atlanta, Georgia, the multi-camera romantic comedy revolved around Zoe Moon, a newly single mom stepping out of the shadow of her famous boxer ex-husband, while trying to balance dating, motherhood, and a blossoming career in cosmetics. While it debuted to respectable ratings, Norwood decided not to return to the show, and it was soon cancelled. In January 2017, Norwood competed with her brother Ray J on the FOX reality cooking series My Kitchen Rules. In July 2018, Norwood became a series regular on the Fox musical drama television series Star. She played the role of Cassie, starting as a recurring role in the second season, and remained a series regular until the series' ending in 2019.

== Filmography ==
Film
Year	Title	Role	Notes
1997	Cinderella	Cinderella	Television film
1998	I Still Know What You Did Last Summer	Karla Wilson	
1999	Double Platinum	Kayla Harris	Television film; Also executive producer
2001	Osmosis Jones	Leah Estrogen	Voice
2013	Temptation: Confessions of a Marriage Counselor	Melinda	
2016	The Perfect Match	Avatia	
2023	Best. Christmas. Ever!	Jackie Jennings	
2024	Descendants: The Rise of Red	Cinderella	
2024	The Front Room	Belinda	
2025	I Know What You Did Last Summer	Karla Wilson	Cameo
2025	Christmas Everyday	Francine "Fancy" Ballantine	
2026	Descendants: Wicked Wonderland	Cinderella	

== Television ==
Television
Year	Title	Role	Notes
1993–1994	Thea	Danesha Turrell	Main role
1995	Hollywood Lives	Herself	One of twelve profiled stars.
1996–2001	Moesha	Moesha Mitchell	Lead role; Also producer (22 episodes)
1997	Jungle Cubs	Latecia	Voice role; Episode: "A Tale of Two Tails/Hair Ball"
2000	The Parkers	Moesha Mitchell	Episode: "Scary Kim"
2002	Sabrina, the Teenage Witch	Mystery Caller	Uncredited; episode: "Guilty"
2002	Reba	Mystery Caller	Uncredited; episode: "She Works Hard for the Money"
2002	Raising Dad	Mystery Caller	Uncredited; episode: "The House of Stewart"
2004	American Dreams	Gladys Knight	Episode: "Long Shots and Short Skirts"
2005	House	Singer	Episode: "DNR"
2006	One on One	Michelle McGinty	4 episodes
2011	90210	Marissa Harris-Young	5 episodes
2011–2012	Drop Dead Diva	Elisa Shayne	5 episodes
2012–2015	The Game	Chardonnay Pitts	Recurring (Season 5) / Lead Role (Seasons 6–9)
2014	The Soul Man	Rita	Episode: "All the Way Live"
2016	Zoe Ever After	Zoe Moon	Lead role
2018–2019	Star	Cassandra "Cassie" Brown	Recurring (Season 2), Series Regular (Season 3)
2021–2022	Queens	Naomi "Xplicit Lyrics"	Lead role

== Appearances and reality television ==
Appearances and reality television
Year	Title	Role	Notes
1995	New York Undercover	Singer	Episode: Digital Underground
2002	Brandy: Special Delivery	Herself	4 episodes
2002	Maybe It's Me	Herself	Episode; "The Quahog Festival Episode"
2006	America's Got Talent	Judge (Herself)	Season 1
2006	Sesame Beginnings: Beginning Together	Herself	
2008	The Hills	Herself	Episode; "I Want You to Be with Me"
2009–2010	For the Love of Ray J	Herself	4 episodes
2010	Dancing with the Stars	Contestant (Herself)	Season 11; Eliminated 9th
2010–2011	Brandy & Ray J: A Family Business	Herself	Also executive producer
2011–2012	Majors & Minors	Mentor (Herself)	9 episodes; Also executive producer
2014	Love & Hip Hop: Hollywood	Herself	Guest appearance
2017	My Kitchen Rules	Contestant (Herself)	
2021	The Voice	Advisor (Herself)	Season 20; Advisor for Team John Legend
2026	Dancing with the Stars	Herself	Season 35; guest performer with Monica

== Accolades ==
Aaward	Year	Category	Work	Result
Blockbuster Entertainment Awards	1999	Favorite Actress - Horror	I Still Know What You Did Last Summer	Nominated
MTV Movie Award	1999	Best Breakthrough Performance	I Still Know What You Did Last Summer	Nominated
NAACP Image Awards	1997	Outstanding Performance in a Youth/Children's Series or Special	Moesha	Won
NAACP Image Awards	1998	Outstanding Actress in a Television Movie, Mini-Series or Dramatic Special	Cinderella	Nominated
NAACP Image Awards	1998	Outstanding Actress in a Comedy Series	Moesha	Nominated
NAACP Image Awards	1999	Outstanding Actress in a Comedy Series	Moesha	Nominated
NAACP Image Awards	2000	Outstanding Actress in a Comedy Series	Moesha	Nominated
NAACP Image Awards	2001	Outstanding Actress in a Comedy Series	Moesha	Nominated
NAACP Image Awards	2014	Outstanding Supporting Actress in a Comedy Series	The Game	Won
