= List of awards and nominations received by Brandy =

Brandy awards and nominations
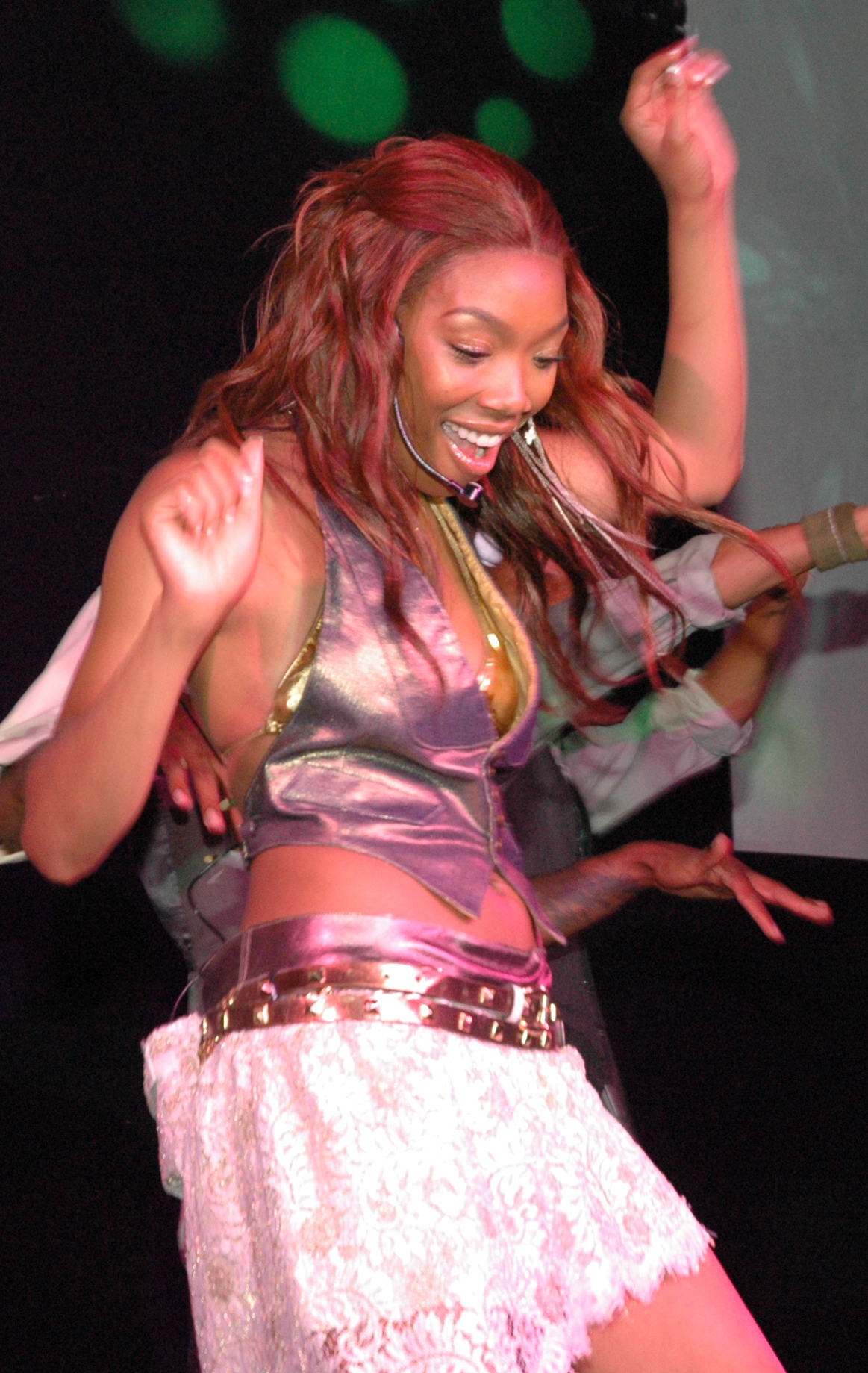
- Norwood in 2004
Awards and nominations
Award	Wins	Nominations
American Music Awards	1	6
Grammy	1	13

Totals (Note: Certain award groups do not simply award one winner. They acknowledge several different recipients, have runners-up, and have third place. Since this is a specific recognition and is different from losing an award, runner-up mentions are considered wins in this award tally. For simplification and to avoid errors, each award in this list has been presumed to have had a prior nomination.)
- Wins: 37
- Nominations: 81

Brandy Norwood, an American singer and actress, has accumulated numerous awards since her career began in the early 1990s. This lists is a condensed list of her most notable awards and nominations.

== All Africa Music Awards ==
Year	Nominee / work	Award	Result	Ref.
2022	Herself	Best Global Artist	Nominated	
2022	Tiwa Savage feat. Brandy - "Somebody's Son"	Best African Collaboration	Nominated	

== American Music Awards ==
Year	Nominee / work	Award	Result	Ref.
1996	Herself	Favorite Soul/R&B New Artist	Won	
1996	Herself	Favorite Soul/R&B Female Artist	Nominated	
1997	Herself	Favorite Soul/R&B Female Artist	Nominated	
1999	Herself	Favorite Soul/R&B Female Artist	Nominated	
1999	Herself	Favorite Pop/Rock Female Artist	Nominated	
2000	Herself	Favorite Female Soul/R&B Artist	Nominated	

== BDS Certified Spin Awards ==
Year	Nominee / work	Award	Result	Ref.
2002	"What About Us?"	100,000 Spins	Won	
2003	"Full Moon"	100,000 Spins	Won	

== Billboard Music Video Awards ==
Year	Nominee / work	Award	Result	Ref.
1995	"I Wanna Be Down"	Best New Rap Artist Clip	Won	
1995	"Baby"	Best New R&B/Urban Artist Clip	Won	
1998	"The Boy Is Mine"	Best R&B/Urban Clip	Won	

== Billboard Year-End List ==
Year	Nominee / work	Award	Result	Ref.
1995	Herself	Top R&B Artists	2nd Place	
1995	Herself	Top New R&B Artists	1st Place	
1995	Herself	Top R&B Artists – Female	1st Place	
1998	"The Boy Is Mine"	Hot Dance Maxi–Singles Sales	1st Place	
1998	"The Boy Is Mine"	Hot 100 Singles Sales	1st Place	
1998	"The Boy Is Mine"	Hot R&B Singles Sales	1st Place	

== Blockbuster Entertainment Awards ==
The Blockbuster Entertainment Awards were a film awards ceremony, founded by Blockbuster Inc., that ran from 1995 until 2001. The awards were produced by Ken Ehrlich every year. In 1999, Norwood received a nod for her performance in I Still Know What You Did Last Summer.

Year	Nominee / work	Award	Result
1999	I Still Know What You Did Last Summer	Favorite Actress — Horror	Nominated

== BMI Awards ==
=== BMI Pop Awards ===
Year	Nominee / work	Award	Result	Ref.
2000	Herself	The Boy Is Mine	Won	

=== BMI R&B/Hip-Hop Awards ===
Year	Nominee / work	Award	Result	Ref.
2019	Herself	President's Award	Honored	

== California Music Awards ==
Founded by now-defunct BAM magazine in 1977 as the Bay Area Music Awards, the "Bammies" were expanded and renamed in 1998 to honor musical excellence across California. Rather than being chosen by an academy, winners are decided by popular vote. Ballots were available in Tower Records stores and participants could also cast their votes online.

Year	Nominee / work	Award	Result	Ref.
1998	Never Say Never	Outstanding R&B Album	Won	

== Congress of Racial Equality ==
Year	Nominee / work	Award	Result	Ref.
2000	Herself	Outstanding Achievement Award	Honored	

== ECHO Awards ==
Year	Nominee / work	Award	Result	Ref.
1999	Never Say Never	Newcomer of the Year, International	Nominated	

== Give Her FlowHERS Awards ==
Year	Nominee / work	Award	Result	Ref.
2023	Herself	The Muse Award	Honored	

== Grammy Awards ==
The Grammy Awards are awarded annually by The Recording Academy. Brandy has won one award from 13 nominations, including Record of the Year, and Best New Artist.

Year	Nominee / work	Award	Result	Ref.
1996	Brandy Norwood	Best New Artist	Nominated	
1996	"Baby"	Best Female R&B Vocal Performance	Nominated	
1997	"Missing You"	Best Pop Collaboration with Vocals	Nominated	
1997	"Sittin' Up In My Room"	Best Female R&B Vocal Performance	Nominated	
1999	"The Boy Is Mine"	Record of the Year	Nominated	
1999	"The Boy Is Mine"	Best R&B Performance by a Duo or Group with Vocals	Won	
1999	"The Boy Is Mine"	Best R&B Song	Nominated	
1999	Never Say Never	Best R&B Album	Nominated	
2000	"Almost Doesn't Count"	Best Female R&B Vocal Performance	Nominated	
2003	Full Moon	Best Contemporary R&B Album	Nominated	
2005	Afrodisiac	Best Contemporary R&B Album	Nominated	
2020	"Love Again" (with Daniel Caesar)	Best R&B Performance	Nominated	
2025	"The Boy Is Mine" (with Ariana Grande & Monica)	Best Pop Duo/Group Performance	Nominated	

=== The Recording Academy Honors ===
Year	Nominee / work	Award	Result	Ref.
2000	Herself	Governors Award	Honored	
2026	Herself	Black Music Icon Award	Honored	

== Groovevolt Music & Fashion Awards ==
Year	Nominee / work	Award	Result	Ref.
2005	Afrodisiac	Best R&B/Soul Album — Female	Nominated	
2005	"Who Is She 2 U"	Best R&B/Soul Song Performance — Female	Nominated	
2005	"Talk About Our Love" (feat. Kanye West)	Best R&B/Soul Song Performance, Duo or Group	Nominated	
2005	"I Tried"	Best R&B/Soul Deep Cut (Unreleased Album Track)	Nominated	

== Hollywood Walk of Fame ==
Year	Nominee / work	Award	Result	Ref.
2026	Herself	Recording Artist	Honored	

== MOBO Awards ==
Year	Nominee / work	Award	Result	Ref.
1998	"The Boy Is Mine"	Best International Single	Nominated	
2004	"Talk About Our Love" (feat. Kanye West)	Best Collaboration	Nominated	
2004	Herself	Best R&B Act	Nominated	

== MTV Awards ==
=== MTV Movie Awards ===
The MTV Movie Awards is a film awards show presented annually on MTV. The nominees are decided by producers and executives at MTV. Norwood has won one award from two nominations.

Year	Nominee / work	Award	Result	Ref.
1996	"Sittin' Up in My Room"	Best Movie Song	Won	
1999	Brandy Norwood	Best Female Breakthrough Performance	Nominated	

=== MTV Video Music Awards ===
The MTV Video Music Awards are awarded annually by MTV. Norwood has received ten nominations.

Year	Nominee / work	Award	Result	Ref.
1995	"I Wanna Be Down"	Best Rap Video	Nominated	
1995	"Baby"	Best Choreography in a Video	Nominated	
1996	"Sittin' Up in My Room"	Best Video from a Film	Nominated	
1996	"Brokenhearted"	Best Cinematography in a Video	Nominated	
1998	"The Boy Is Mine"	Video of the Year	Nominated	
1998	"The Boy Is Mine"	Best R&B Video	Nominated	
1999	"Have You Ever?"	Best R&B Video	Nominated	
2002	"What About Us?"	Viewer's Choice	Nominated	
2004	"Talk About Our Love"	Best R&B Video	Nominated	
2016	"The Girl is Mine" (99 Souls featuring Destiny's Child and Brandy)	Best Electronic Video	Nominated	

== NAACP Image Award ==
The NAACP Image Award is an accolade presented by the American National Association for the Advancement of Colored People to honor outstanding people of color in film, television, music, and literature.

Year	Nominee / work	Award	Result	Ref.
1996	Herself	Outstanding New Artist	Won	
1996	Herself	Outstanding Female Artist	Nominated	
1996	Brandy	Outstanding Album	Nominated	
1997	Moesha	Outstanding Youth Actor/Actress	Won	
1998	Moesha	Outstanding Actress in a Comedy Series	Nominated	
1998	Cinderella	Outstanding Actress in a Television Movie, Mini-Series or Dramatic Special	Nominated	
1999	Moesha	Outstanding Actress in a Comedy Series	Nominated	
1999	Brandy	Outstanding Female Artist	Nominated	
1999	Brandy & Monica	Outstanding Duo or Group	Nominated	
1999	"The Boy Is Mine" (with Monica)	Outstanding Music Video (for The Boy Is Mine)	Nominated	
1999	Never Say Never	Outstanding Album	Nominated	
2000	Moesha	Outstanding Actress in a Comedy Series	Nominated	
2001	Moesha	Outstanding Actress in a Comedy Series	Nominated	
2014	The Game	Outstanding Supporting Actress in a Comedy Series	Won	
2021	B7	Outstanding Album	Nominated	
2022	"Somebody's Son" (with Tiwa Savage)	Outstanding International Song	Nominated	
2025	Descendents: The Rise of Red	Outstanding Supporting Actress in a Limited Television Series, Special or Movie	Nominated	
2026	Christmas Everyday!	Outstanding Actress in a Television Movie, Mini-Series or Dramatic Special	Nominated	

== Nickelodeon Kids' Choice Awards ==
The Nickelodeon Kids' Choice Awards are an annual awards show that airs on the Nickelodeon cable channel, which airs live and is usually held and telecast live, that honors the year's biggest television, movie, and music acts, as voted by Nickelodeon viewers.

Year	Nominee / work	Award	Result	Ref.
1996	Herself	Favorite Singer	Won	
1996	"Baby"	Favorite Song	Nominated	
1997	Herself	Favorite Singer	Nominated	
1998	Moesha	Favorite TV Actress	Nominated	
1999	Herself	Favorite Singer	Nominated	
2000	Herself	Favorite Singer	Nominated	
2000	Moesha	Favorite TV Actress	Nominated	
2001	Moesha	Favorite TV Actress	Nominated	

== People's Choice Awards ==
Year	Nominee / work	Award	Result	Ref.
1996	Herself	Favorite New TV Actress	Nominated	
2005	Herself	Favorite Look	Nominated	

== Pollstar Awards ==
Year	Nominee / work	Award	Result	Ref.
1996	Herself	Best New Rap / Dance Artist Tour	Won	

== Pop Awards ==
Year	Nominee / work	Award	Result	Ref.
2021	Herself	Lifetime Achievement Award	Nominated	

== Radio Music Awards ==
Year	Nominee / work	Award	Result	Ref.
1999	"Have You Ever?"	Song of The Year: Rhythm/Urban	Nominated	
1999	"Have You Ever?"	Best Hook-Up Song	Nominated	

== Source Hip-Hop Music Awards ==
Year	Nominee / work	Award	Result	Ref.
1999	Herself	R&B Artist of the Year	Nominated	

== Soul Train Awards ==
=== Soul Train Music Awards ===
Year	Nominee / work	Award	Result	Ref.
1995	Brandy	R&B/Soul Album, Female	Nominated	
1995	"I Wanna Be Down"	R&B/Soul Artist, Female	Nominated	
1995	Herself	R&B/Soul New Artist	Won	
1996	"Brokenhearted"	Best R&B/Soul Single, Female	Nominated	
1997	"Sittin' Up In My Room"	Best R&B/Soul Single, Female	Nominated	
1999	"The Boy Is Mine"	Best R&B/Soul Single, Group, Band or Duo	Nominated	
1999	Never Say Never	Best R&B/Soul Album, Female	Nominated	
2005	Afrodisiac	Best Soul/R&B Album-Female	Nominated	
2013	"Put It Down"	Best Collaboration	Nominated	
2016	Herself	Lady of Soul Award	Honored	
2020	Herself	Best Female R&B/Soul Artist	Nominated	
2020	Herself	Soul Train Certified Award	Won	
2020	B7	Album of the Year	Nominated	

=== Soul Train Lady of Soul Awards ===
Year	Nominee / work	Award	Result	Ref.
1995	Brandy	R&B/Soul Album of the Year	Won	
1995	Herself	R&B/Soul New Artist	Won	
1995	"I Wanna Be Down"	Best R&B/Single, Solo	Won	
1995	"I Wanna Be Down"	Best R&B/Soul Song of the Year	Won	
1996	Herself	The Aretha Franklin Award for Entertainer of the Year	Won	
1999	The Boy Is Mine	Best R&B/Soul Single, Group, Band or Duo	Nominated	
1999	Never Say Never	Best R&B/Soul Album of the Year Solo	Nominated	
2003	"Full Moon"	Best R&B/Soul or Rap Song,	Nominated	

== Stellar Awards ==
Year	Nominee / work	Award	Result
2001	Norwood Kids Foundation	Most Notable Achievement Award	Honored

== Teen Choice Awards ==
The Teen Choice Awards is an annual awards show that airs on the Fox Network. The awards honor the year's biggest achievements in music, movies, sports, television, fashion and more, voted by teen viewers aged 13 to 19.

Year	Nominee / work	Award	Result	Ref.
1999	Moesha	TV – Choice Actress	Nominated	
1999	Herself	Music - Choice Female Artist	Won	
2003	Herself	Choice music hip-hop/R&B artist	Nominated	

== Urban One Honors ==
Year	Nominee / work	Award	Result	Ref.
2018	Herself	Cathy Hughes Award of Excellence	Won	

== XSCAPE Puerto Rico LGBT Arts & Cultural Music Festival ==
Year	Nominated work	Category	Result	Ref.
2017	Herself	Woman of Soul: Lifetime Career Achievement	Honored	

== Young Artists Awards ==
The Young Artist Award is an accolade bestowed by the Young Artist Association, a non-profit organization founded in 1978 to honor excellence of youth performers, and to provide scholarships for young artists who may be physically and/or financially challenged.

Year	Nominee / work	Award	Result	Ref.
1994	Thea (with Brenden Jefferson, Adam Jeffries, and Jason Weaver)	Outstanding Youth Ensemble in a Television Series	Nominated	
1997	Moesha	Best Performance in a TV Comedy: Leading Young Actress	Nominated	
1998	Moesha	Best Performance in a TV Comedy: Leading Young Actress	Nominated	
1999	Moesha	Best Performance in a TV Drama or Comedy Series: Leading Young Actress	Nominated	

== Young Hollywood Hall of Fame ==
Year	Nominated work / Recipient	Category	Result	Ref.
1996	Herself	Music Artist	Inducted	

== YoungStar Awards ==
The YoungStar Awards, presented by The Hollywood Reporter, honored young American actors and actresses from ages 6–18 in their work in film, television, stage and music. The awards ceremony was held from 1995 until 2000.

Year	Nominee / work	Award	Result
1997	Moesha	Best Performance by a Young Actress in a Comedy TV Series	Nominated
