= Malcolm Ohanwe =

German-Nigerian journalist and media personality

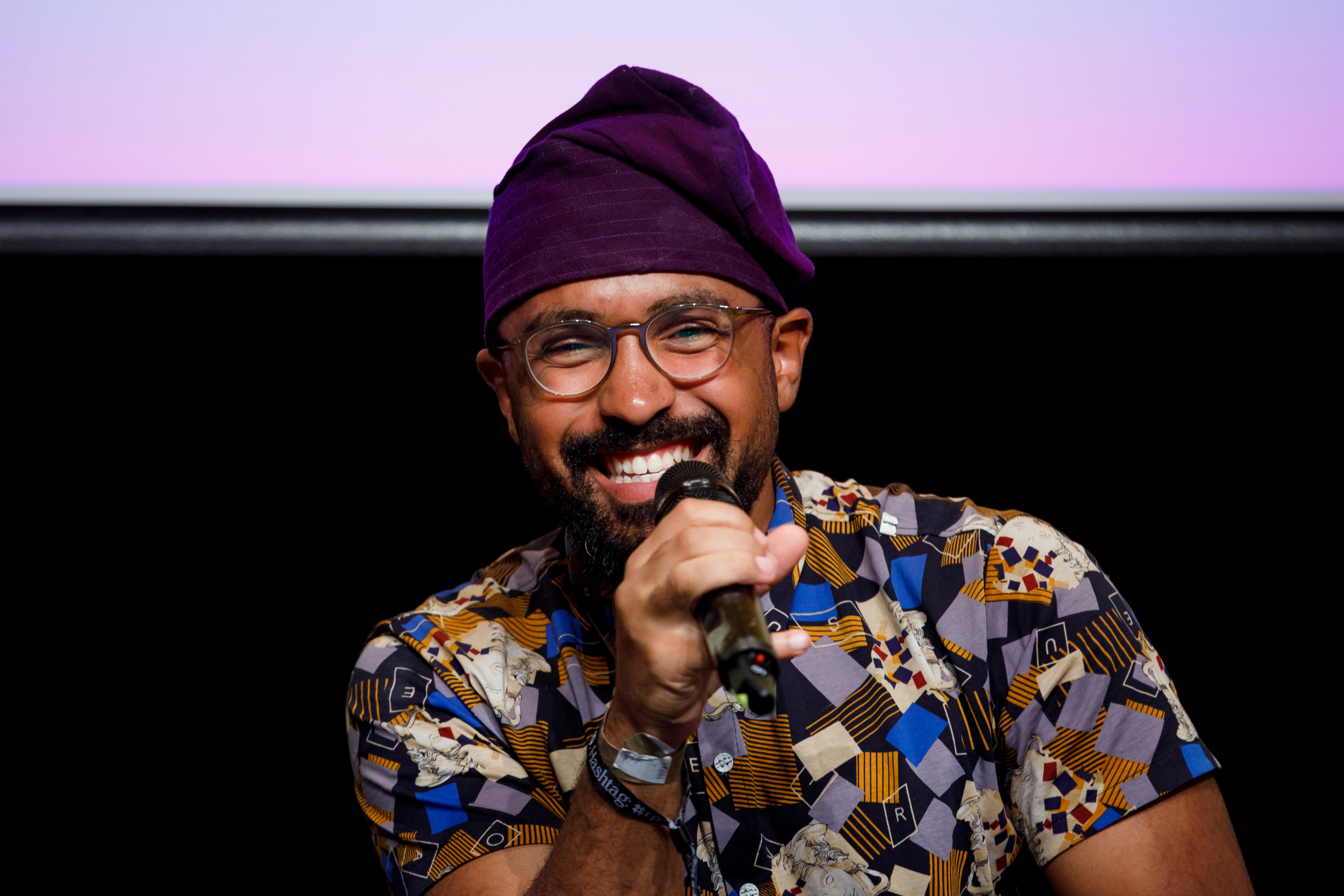
- Ohanwe in 2009
- Born: Malcolm Oscar Uzoma Ohanwe; 1993 (age 32–33); Munich, Germany
- Education: LMU Munich
- Occupations: Journalist; author; anchor
- Years active: 2009–present

Malcolm Oscar Uzoma Ohanwe (born 1993 in Munich) is a German-Nigerian journalist, media personality and TV host.

== Early life and education ==
Malcolm Ohanwe was born in Munich, Germany, to a mother of Palestinian descent and a Nigerian father, a barber. He made his journalistic beginnings after graduating from high school as an author for German television network ProSieben, as well as an editor for the German hip hop-themed website Rap2Soul.de Ohanwe studied English Studies, Middle Eastern Studies and Romance Studies at LMU Munich and therefore speaks and works in Arabic, German, English, French, Italian and Spanish).

== Career ==
On his YouTube channel MalcolmMusic since 2013 he'd feature interviews with a variety of R&B, pop and hip hop performers. Often his interviews would lead to global news coverage as his bold interviewing styl regularly made headlines in predominantly American and British media outlets. Examples include interviews with Tamar Braxton, Christina Milian, Michelle Williams, JoJo, H.E.R., Nivea und Brandy.

Additionally he worked as a culture and social politics journalist for the television and radio network Bayerischen Rundfunk (BR). For BR he has been on air as television reporter as well as one of the presenters for the TV show "RESPEKT". After Ohanwe posted on Twitter in October 2023 in the context of the Gaza war, BR and Arte stated that they do not intend to further work with Ohanwe.

Additionally Ohanwe has served as a television news correspondent for the English language programm of Deutschen Welle where he reported about cultural and political happenings around West Africa from the correspondent studio in Lagos. He also published for the Atlanta based radio station WABE.

== Awards ==
- 2019: International Music Journalism Award. For his Wir sind zu viele: Warum deutscher Pop nicht mehr weiß bleibt (Best Work of Music Journalism, Under 30)
