= Phases (book) =

Memoir by Brandy Norwood

Phases: A Memoir
- Author: Brandy
- Language: English
- Genre: Memoir
- Publisher: HarperCollins
- Publication date: March 31, 2026
- Publication place: United States
- ISBN: 9781335013279

Phases is a memoir by American singer Brandy Norwood. It was published on March 31, 2026, by HarperCollins.

== Background and release ==
Norwood first announced her then-untitled memoir in January 2025, stating it was to be released on 7 October 2025. On September 18, 2025, Brandy announced that the memoir would be called Phases and would be released on 31 March 2026.

The book was co-written with Gerrick Kennedy.

== Synopsis ==
The book covers Brandy's career and life in the entertainment and music industry, as well as detailing her upbringing in Mississippi and California. It also covers issues including duty of care in the music industry, addiction, parenthood and love. The memoir also discusses her relationships with high profile figures, such as Whitney Houston (her idol and co-star in Cinderella), ex-partner and Boyz II Men-singer Wanya Morris, The Boy Is Mine-collaborator and friend Monica, brother Ray J, collaborator Kanye West and record producer Rodney Jerkins (Darkchild).

== Reception ==
=== Commercial ===
Phases debuted at number one on the New York Times Bestseller list for Hardcover Non-fiction. It also debuted at number two on the Publishers Weekly Bestseller List for Non-fiction, selling 11,338 units in its first week.

=== Reviews ===
A review in Publishers Weekly described the book as a serviceable memoir that would satisfy fans of Norwood's music. In The Guardian, Michael Cragg described the memoir as "vividly told and occasionally harrowing". A review in Kirkus Reviews wrote that the book featured a "candor and conversational prose", and noted that the work focused more on the challenges its author had faced than on her successes.
