= A Nightmare on Drug Street =

Nightmare on Drug Street
- Directed by: Traci Wald Donat
- Written by: George Larrimore
- Starring: Raymond Cruz; Joleen Lutz; Adam Jeffries
- Distributed by: Twin Tower
- Release date: 1989
- Running time: 39 minutes
- Country: United States
- Language: English

A Nightmare on Drug Street is a 1989 direct-to-video anti-drug short film directed by Traci Wald Donat. The film follows three deceased young characters, Felipe, Jill and Eddie, who now exist only as spirits in a dark purgatory, where they lament the things they can no longer enjoy. The reason they're dead is that they each decided to do drugs, a decision they now regret. Then, they proceed to tell each other's stories of how they got involved with drugs and consequently perished:

-Felipe, a high-school senior and basketball athlete, smoked dope, under the guise that college kids did it, and drank beer, because his dad did so. One evening, he went joyriding while under the influence of both, and inevitably got into a fatal car accident, that also claimed the life of his equally drunk friend, and would've claimed the life of his younger brother if he hadn't gotten out of the car immediately beforehand.

-Jill, a high-school freshman, was introduced to cocaine by an attractive new student, as a mood enhancer. She quickly became addicted, and went through a downward spiral, where she gave away all her money and cherished possessions for more cocaine, and even went as far as to steal from family and friends. Finally, after a final but desperate trade, she died of an overdose of cocaine and unidentified pills.

-Eddie, a 5th grader, was pressured by his friends to experiment with crack cocaine, and he reluctantly smoked some. That evening at dinner, Eddie's parents suspected something was up with him, but they shrugged it off as a cold or allergy, until Eddie suddenly went into cardiac arrest and died, from the crack's effect on a heart defect he unknowingly had.

After the three tell their tales, they give advice to the viewer on how to say no to drugs, or get help to stop if they've already started to avoid the same fate.
