= Every Day Is a New Day =

Studio album by Diana Ross
- Released: May 4, 1999
- Genre: R&B
- Length: 54:54
- Label: Motown
- Producer: Chuckii Booker; Bobby Guy; Ernie Lake; Arif Mardin; Malik Pendleton; Gen Rubin; Daryl Simmons; Steve Skinner; Ric Wake

Diana Ross chronology
| Voice of Love (1996) | Every Day Is a New Day (1999) | Love & Life: The Very Best of Diana Ross (2001) |

Singles from Every Day Is a New Day
- 1. "Until We Meet Again" Released: 1999; 2. "Not Over You Yet" Released: April 1999; 3. "Every Day Is a New Day" Released: 1999

Every Day Is a New Day is the twenty-second studio album by American singer Diana Ross, released on May 4, 1999, by Motown Records. Ross consulted a number of new collaborators to work with her on the album, including Arif Mardin, Chuckii Booker, Christopher Ward, Malik Pendleton, Ric Wake, and Daryl Simmons. Its release coincided with the broadcast of the ABC television motion picture, Double Platinum (1999), in which Ross co-starred with singer Brandy and her character performed several songs from Every Day Is a New Day

The album debuted and peaked at number 108 on the US Billboard 200 and number 47 on the US Top R&B/Hip-Hop Albums, also reaching number 73 in the United Kingdom, where it became her lowest-charting album of original material since Ross (1978). Every Day is a New Day marked Ross' final contractual album released during her second Motown tenure until the label released her previously-shelved jazz standards album, Blue, a 1970s studio album, in 2006 and would also be Ross' last studio album of original material for twenty-two years.

== Background ==
On this album, Ross continued to contribute to compositions, co-writing the bonus tracks "Free (I'm Gone)" and "Drop the Mask". These tracks were only available on the Japanese edition of the album. The album also includes cover versions of Martha Wash's 1992 US club hit "Carry On" and "He Lives in You" from The Lion King musical.

Ross delivered several television specials throughout the millennium years. UK TV promotion for the album included the ITV special An Audience with Diana Ross. On the special, along with past hits, the songs Ross performed from Every Day Is a New Day were "He Lives in You" and the single "Not Over You Yet", recreating elements of the music video with choreography. Singer Boy George duetted with her on the number one single "Upside Down".

== Critical reception ==
Professional ratings
Review scores
| Source | Rating |
|---|---|
| AllMusic | 2.5/5 stars |
| The Independent | 2/5 stars |
| MTV Asia | 7/10 |
| Rolling Stone | 3/5 stars |

Allmusic editor Stephen Thomas Erlewine called Every Day Is a New Day Ross' "most carefully conceived album in years, filled with immaculate productions that appealed either to the dancefloor or adult contemporary radio. The problem is, there wasn't much to recommend in the way of songs. Although the album sounds good, nothing on it truly catches hold the way [...] As a result, Every Day Is a New Day stands as nothing more than a stylish but failed comeback." Alec Foege wrote in his review for People that Every Day Is a New Day was "an album that melds her enduring style with fresh substance [...] For more than 30 years, Ross has lured her fans. Looks like she’ll be keeping them." The Independent's Tim Perry found that "this album of mainly ballads and torch songs sounds past its sell-by date already." Chicago Sun Times critic Miriam DiNunzio found that "There is much to celebrate about this twelve-cut songfest from the supreme pop diva."

== Chart performance ==
In the United States, Every Day Is a New Day peaked at number 108 on the US Billboard 200 and at number 47 on the Top R&B/Hip-Hop Albums. This marked Ross' highest-charting release since her 1991 studio album The Force Behind the Power. Elswehere, the album failed to chart. It, however, reached, number 73 on the UK Albums Chart, becoming her lowest-charting album of original material since Ross (1978). The album sold around 275,000 copies worldwide on release.

Every Day Is a New Day yielded several singles, including Ross' final hit single of the 1990s in the UK, "Not Over You Yet", which was remixed and became a top ten hit, peaking at number 9 in the UK Singles Chart. A remix of "Until We Meet Again" reached number 2 on the US Dance Club Songs. "Sugarfree", though not released as a single, received urban adult airplay in the United States and peaked at number 21 on the Bubbling Under R&B/Hip-Hop Songs.

== Track listing ==
| No. | Title | Writer(s) | Producer(s) | Length |
|---|---|---|---|---|
| 1. | "He Lives in You" | Mark A. Mancina; Jay Rifkin; Lebonhang Morake | Arif Mardin | 4:51 |
| 2. | "Love Is All That Matters" | Diane Warren | Mardin | 4:08 |
| 3. | "Until We Meet Again" | Denise Rich; Gen Rubin | Ric Wake; Rubin | 4:27 |
| 4. | "Got to Be Free" | Malik Pendleton; Nicole Johnson | Pendleton | 4:14 |
| 5. | "Not Over You Yet" | Pendleton; Kenneth Kelly | Pendleton | 5:03 |
| 6. | "So They Say" | Pendleton; Mary Brown | Pendleton | 5:12 |
| 7. | "Every Day Is a New Day" | Pendleton; Juanita Wynn; Tracey Anderson | Pendleton | 5:55 |
| 8. | "Sugarfree" | Chuckii Booker; Tami Booker | C. Booker | 4:46 |
| 9. | "Someone That You Loved Before" | Warren; Eric Carmen | Mardin | 3:48 |
| 10. | "Hope Is an Open Window" | Christopher Ward; Tim Tickner; Diana Ross | Daryl Simmons | 4:56 |
| 11. | "Carry On" (Remix) | Eric Beall | Steve Skinner; Mardin; Bobby Guy; Ernie Lake | 3:43 |
| 12. | "Until We Meet Again" (Hex Hector Remix) | Rich; Rubin | Wake; Rubin; Hector^{[a]} | 8:04 |
| Total length: | | | | 54:54 |

UK Track list
| No. | Title | Writer(s) | Producer(s) | Length |
|---|---|---|---|---|
| 12. | "Not Over You Yet" (Metro Radio Edit) | Pendleton; Kelly | Pendleton; Mark Taylor^{[a]}; Brian Rawling^{[a]} | 4:03 |

Japanese bonus tracks
| No. | Title | Writer(s) | Producer(s) | Length |
|---|---|---|---|---|
| 12. | "Drop the Mask" | Ward; Tickner; Ross | Ward; Tickner | 4:46 |
| 13. | "Free (I'm Gone)" | Ward; Tickner; Ross | Ward; Tickner | 3:38 |
| 14. | "Until We Meet Again" (Hex Hector Remix) | Rich; Rubin | Wake; Rubin; Hector^{[a]} | 8:04 |

Notes

- ^{^[a]} signifies an additional producer

== Charts ==
| Chart (1999) | Peak position |
|---|---|
| UK Albums (OCC) | 71 |
| US Billboard 200 | 108 |
| US Top R&B/Hip-Hop Albums (Billboard) | 47 |
