= Not Over You Yet =

1999 single by Diana Ross

- UK single cover

Single by Diana Ross

from the album Every Day Is a New Day
- B-side: "Drop the Mask"
- Released: October 25, 1999
- Studio: Zavy Workshop; Carriage House
- Length: 4:03
- Label: EMI; Ross
- Songwriters: Malik Pendleton; Kenneth Kelly
- Producers: 'Zavy Kid' Malik Pendleton; Brian Rawling, Mark Taylor (remix)

Diana Ross singles chronology
"I Will Survive" (1996)	"Not Over You Yet" (1999)	"Goin' Back" (2001)

Music video
- "Not Over You Yet" on YouTube

"Not Over You Yet" is a song by American singer Diana Ross from her 20th studio album, Every Day Is a New Day (1999). It was written by 'Zavy Kid' Malik Pendleton and Kenneth Kelly and produced by the former, Brian Rawling, and Mark Taylor. EMI and Ross Records released the song as the second single from the album on October 25, 1999. It was her final hit single of the 1990s in the United Kingdom, peaking at number nine on the UK Singles Chart. The single also reached number six in Hungary, and number 67 in Germany, and number 74 in the Netherlands. A music video was produced for promotional purposes. Ross performed the song on the ITV special An Audience with Diana Ross, recreating elements of the music video with choreography.

== Critical reception ==
The Daily Vault's Mark Millan wrote that it is "definitely the album's strongest and most focused track". He added that Ross "once again delivers a heartfelt reading of the personalized lyric, 'You were the first who ever brought me out / Showed me what life and love was all about / Gave me things that I never need / You're in my thoughts, my every dream'." Paul Willistein from The Morning Call noted that the singer "gets jiggy wit' the loopy 'Not Over You Yet'". Kitty Empire from NME called it "some grown-up housey garagey disco-y nonsense that's really of no great consequence." Chuck Campbell from Scripps Howard News Service described it as a "moderately hypnotic" song, "prodded by a politely percolating mechanical loop."

== Track listings ==
- UK CD1 and cassette single
1. "Not Over You Yet" (Metro radio edit) – 4:03
2. "Not Over You Yet" (original radio edit) – 3:40
3. "Drop the Mask" – 4:46
- UK CD2
1. "Not Over You Yet" (Metro radio edit) – 4:03
2. "Not Over You Yet" (Dronez Mix) – 6:55
3. "Not Over You Yet" (Sharp Diamond vocal mix) – 7:12
- European CD single
1. "Not Over You Yet" (Metro radio edit)
2. "Not Over You Yet" (original album version)

== Charts ==
=== Weekly charts ===
Chart (1999)	Peak position
Belgium (Ultratip Bubbling Under Flanders)	3
Europe (Eurochart Hot 100)	40
Germany (GfK)	67
Hungary (Mahasz)	6
Netherlands (Single Top 100)	74
Scottish Singles Sales (Official Charts)	9
UK Singles (Official Charts)	9

=== Year-end charts ===
Chart (1999)	Position
UK Singles (OCC)	191
