= The Boy Is Mine:Las Vegas Residency =

2027 concert residency by Brandy & Monica

- Residency by Brandy & Monica
- Location: Winchester, Nevada, U.S.
- Venue: Resorts World Theatre
- Start date: May 29, 2027
- End date: July 17, 2027
- No. of shows: 10

Brandy & Monica concert chronology
- The Boy Is Mine Tour (2025); The Boy Is Mine:Las Vegas Residency (2027)

The Boy Is Mine:Las Vegas Residency is the first concert residency and second co-headlining concert by American singers Brandy & Monica. Announced in November 2026, it is produced by Black Promoters Collective and set to commence May 29, 2027 and conclude July 17, 2027 for ten shows.

== Show dates ==
List of 2027 concerts
Date (2027)	City	Country	Venue
May 29	Las Vegas	United States	Resorts World Theatre
May 30	Las Vegas	United States	Resorts World Theatre
June 2	Las Vegas	United States	Resorts World Theatre
June 4	Las Vegas	United States	Resorts World Theatre
June 5	Las Vegas	United States	Resorts World Theatre
July 9	Las Vegas	United States	Resorts World Theatre
July 10	Las Vegas	United States	Resorts World Theatre
July 14	Las Vegas	United States	Resorts World Theatre
July 16	Las Vegas	United States	Resorts World Theatre
July 17	Las Vegas	United States	Resorts World Theatre
