= Adam Jeffries =

American actor

- Born: c. 1976; Tuskegee, Alabama
- Occupation: Actor
- Years active: 1989–2003

Adam Jeffries (born c. 1976) is an American actor. He is best known for his roles as Lester Freeman on the Fox series True Colors (1990−92) and Jarvis Turrell Jr. on ABC's Thea (1993−94), both of which are sitcoms. Jeffries won two Young Artist Awards during his career.

== Early life ==
Jeffries was born in Tuskegee, Alabama around 1976. He was raised in Atlanta, Georgia. As a child, Jeffries performed in community theater and school productions. In the mid-1980s, he and his mother moved to Los Angeles, California, embarking on an acting career.

== Career ==
Jeffries first began acting in 1989 in the role of Eddie in the educational short film A Nightmare on Drug Street, which was released on VHS as a teaching tool for schools. After appearing in several television series and television movies, Jeffries landed the role of Lester Freeman in the Fox sitcom True Colors, a series about an interracial couple and their children from previous marriages. The creator of the show, Michael J. Weithorn, stated Dulé Hill auditioned for the part, but Jeffries was chosen based on his sense of humor. John J. O'Connor, a reviewer for The New York Times, viewed Jeffries as charming in the role of Lester. He received two consecutive Young Artist Awards for his work in the series. The series was canceled in 1992.

The next year, he portrayed Thea Vidale's oldest son, box boy Jarvis Turrell, Jr., in the short-lived ABC series Thea. Jeffries received his third Young Artist Award nomination, in the category of best ensemble alongside his television siblings. In 1995, he appeared in an episode of The Client, another short-lived series that was based on the 1994 hit film. In it, Jeffries portrayed an expelled student who burned the American flag. Jeffries made guest appearances on Family Matters and The Wonder Years, and had a small role in Ghost Dad (1990), his only role in a feature film.

After his appearance on The Client, Jeffries took a five-year hiatus from acting. In 2000, he had a role in the soap opera Days of Our Lives, and guest starred on sitcom Just Shoot Me!. His last acting role was in the 2003 television movie Newton.

== Filmography ==
Film
Year	Film	Role	Other notes
1990	Ghost Dad	Buddy #2	
Television
Year	Title	Role	Notes
1989	A Nightmare on Drug Street	Eddie	Short film
1989	The Wonder Years	Simeonee	1 episode
1989	Family Matters	Mark	1 episode
1990	Capital News		Television movie
1990–1992	True Colors	Lester Freeman	46 episodes
1991	Seeds of Tragedy	Six Pack	Television movie
1991	Miss Jones	2nd Boy	Television movie
1993–1994	Thea	Jarvis Turrell, Jr.	19 episodes
1995	The Client	Jamal James Garrett	1 episode
2000–2001	Days of our Lives	Larry Morris	1 episode
2002	Just Shoot Me!	Danny	1 episode
2003	Newton	Tom the Mailman	Television movie

== Awards and nominations ==
Year	Award	Result	Category	Series
1991	Won	Young Artist Awards	Best Young Actor Starring in a New Television Series	True Colors
1992	Won	Young Artist Awards	Outstanding Young Comedian in a Television Series	True Colors
1994	Nominated	Young Artist Awards	Outstanding Youth Ensemble in a Television Series	Thea (Shared with Brenden Jefferson, Brandy Norwood, and Jason Weaver)
