= True Colors (American TV series) =

American sitcom

- Genre: Sitcom
- Created by: Michael J. Weithorn
- Written by: Peter Freedman; Gregory Allen Howard; Jeffrey Joseph; Michael J. Weithorn
- Directed by: Peter Bonerz; Stan Lathan; Arlene Sanford; Rob Schiller; Carol Scott; John Sgueglia
- Starring: Frankie Faison (Season 1); Cleavon Little (Season 2); Stephanie Faracy; Claude Brooks; Brigid Conley Walsh; Adam Jeffries; Nancy Walker
- Theme music composer: Lennie Niehaus
- Composer: Gordon Lustig
- Country of origin: United States
- Original language: English
- No. of seasons: 2
- No. of episodes: 45

Production
- Executive producer: Michael J. Weithorn
- Producer: Faye Oshima Belyeu
- Running time: 22–24 minutes
- Production companies: Hanley Productions; 20th Century Fox Television

Original release
- Network: Fox
- Release: September 2, 1990 – April 12, 1992

True Colors is an American sitcom television series that aired on Fox from September 2, 1990, to April 12, 1992, for a total of 45 episodes. The series was created by Michael J. Weithorn, and featured an interracial marriage and a subsequent blended family.

== Synopsis ==
=== Premise and first season ===
Ronald Freeman (Frankie Faison) is a widowed African-American dentist in Baltimore who marries Ellen Davis (Stephanie Faracy), a divorced white kindergarten teacher who was one of his patients. Ron has two sons from his first marriage, 17-year-old earnest conservative Terry (Claude Brooks) and daydreaming 14-year-old troublemaker Lester (Adam Jeffries); Ellen has a teenage daughter: studious, cause-driven Katie (Brigid Conley Walsh). Ellen's ex-husband Leonard (played in guest appearances by Paul Sand), who is accepting of her second marriage, would occasionally visit her while attempting to get his life back on track. Although the series did focus on race issues, most episodes focused on the family adjusting to their new living situation and the three children going through adolescence.

=== Second season ===
In the series' second season, Faison was replaced by Cleavon Little as Ron Freeman. Nancy Walker, who played Ellen’s mother (who lived with the couple despite disapproving of their interracial relationship) was suffering from lung cancer, ultimately only appeared in half the season's episodes due to her treatments and compromised health; she used a motorized wheelchair after she suddenly lost her physical mobility. Terry went off to Marshall State University that fall, not far from home. Ellen accepted a new teaching job at Cortez Junior High, and during the season, she finally realized her long-time talent as a painter. She began to showcase some of her work at local art exhibits, in hopes of launching a new side career. Early in 1992, Robert (Norman D. Golden II) was introduced. Robert, who went by the nickname "Twist", was a young neighbor boy who attached himself to the Freemans, stealing scenes and causing an uproar, usually involving Lester and Terry along the way. Meanwhile, Little looked more and more gaunt during the season; the actor disclosed that he was battling colorectal cancer.

=== Cancellation and cast deaths ===
Fox shortened the season order for True Colors by February sweeps and kept the episode total at 21. The new episode that aired on April 12, 1992, wound up being the series' last, as Fox cancelled True Colors one month later. Walker, who had continued working into the winter months until she could no longer do so, died on March 25, 1992, after the series had produced what would be its last episode, but less than a month before the last original episode aired. On October 22, 1992, Little died of cancer.

== Cast ==
- Frankie Faison - Ronald Freeman (1990–1991)
- Cleavon Little - Ronald Freeman (1991–1992)
- Stephanie Faracy - Ellen Davis Freeman
- Nancy Walker - Sara Bower
- Brigid Conley Walsh - Katie Davis
- Claude Brooks - Terry Freeman
- Adam Jeffries - Lester Freeman
- Norman D. Golden II - Twist (aka Robert) (1992)

== Episodes ==
=== Series overview ===
Season	Episodes	Originally released	
Season	Episodes	First released	Last released
1	24	September 2, 1990	May 12, 1991
2	21	August 22, 1991	April 12, 1992

=== Season 1 (1990–91) ===
No. overall	No. in season	Title	Directed by	Written by	Original release date	Prod. code	Viewers (millions)
1	1	"A Visit from Ray"	Stan Lathan	Michael J. Weithorn	September 2, 1990	7T02	13.3
Thanksgiving is around the corner, which is also two months since Ron's wedding. He wishes to use this time for everyone to be together and start acting as a family. One of Ron's patients is a redneck who breeds turkeys, and Ron says he will treat him in exchange for a turkey for the dinner. However, he misunderstands this as Ron wanting a live turkey, who Lester names "Ray" due to the turkey's resemblance to Ray Charles and whom everyone starts to treat like a pet.
2	2	"A Pair of Cranks"	Stan Lathan	Michael J. Weithorn	September 9, 1990	7T01	10.1
Ron's disdain for Lester's friend JR Taylor is justified when he shoplifts a pair of expensive athletic shoes. When Lester is accused of same, Sara bails him out by purchasing the shoes to avoid police involvement. But Ron finds Sara's "gift" and Lester realizes he would have been better off in the County jail than in his father's jail.
3	3	"One of the Girls"	John Sgueglia	Lloyd Garver	September 16, 1990	7T04	7.2
4	4	"A Dog's Life"	John Sgueglia	Michael J. Weithorn	September 23, 1990	7T03	7.0
Terry is offered a scholarship, but when Katie joins him at his scholarship interview, she accidentally kills the interviewer's dog.
5	5	"Step Lightly"	John Sgueglia	Michael J. Weithorn	September 30, 1990	7T05	8.1
6	6	"Life with Fathers"	John Sgueglia	Anne Convy	October 7, 1990	7T06	7.5
7	7	"What's Wrong with that Boy?"	John Sgueglia	Michael J. Weithorn	October 21, 1990	7T07	8.4
8	8	"Tooth or Consequences"	Rob Schiller	Gregory Allen Howard	October 28, 1990	7T08	9.2
9	9	"Soft Shell"	Arlene Sanford	Stan Seidel	November 4, 1990	7T09	9.6
10	10	"Young at Heart"	Peter Bonerz	Peter Freedman	November 11, 1990	7T10	6.6
11	11	"Occasional Wife"	Peter Bonerz	Anne Convy	November 18, 1990	7T11	9.2
12	12	"High Anxiety"	Carol Scott	Story by : Regina Y. Hicks; Teleplay by : Peter Freedman	November 25, 1990	7T12	9.5
Terry harbors a fear of flying due to his acrophobia. Katie tries to use a psychological method to get Terry to overcome his fear of heights on the roof, but a gust of wind causes everyone to get locked out of the building.
13	13	"Puppet Regime"	Rob Schiller	Peter Freedman	December 16, 1990	7T13	9.0
14	14	"Christmas Show '90"	Rob Schiller	Michael J. Weithorn	December 23, 1990	7T14	7.2
15	15	"Moment of Ruth"	Rob Schiller	Lloyd Garver & Regina Y. Hicks	January 13, 1991	7T15	9.9
16	16	"A Real Pain"	Rob Schiller	Stan Seidel	February 3, 1991	7T16	8.9
17	17	"The Tender Trap"	Carol Scott	Peter Freedman & Anne Convy	February 10, 1991	7T17	10.3
18	18	"Opposites Attract"	Rob Schiller	Stan Seidel	February 17, 1991	7T18	10.4
19	19	"Homies Alone"	Arlene Sanford	Story by : Peter Freedman; Teleplay by : Regina Hicks & Stan Seidel	March 3, 1991	7T19	10.6
During a horror movie-marathon, Katie and Lester do Macaulay Culkin proud while holding down the Freeman residence against a masked serial-killer. Actually, the "Slasher" turns out to be Ron, who forgot his housekeys.
20	20	"Daughter Dearest"	Peter Bonerz	Regina Y. Hicks	March 24, 1991	7T20	8.3
Katie dates a fellow activist, but Terry has an intuition that the man is trying to bed her, causing Ron to show protective concern for his stepdaughter.
21	21	"A Matter of Principal"	Peter Bonerz	William Schifrin	April 14, 1991	7T21	7.2
22	22	"Superman, Superego"	Michael J. Weithorn	Michael J. Weithorn	April 21, 1991	7T23	7.6
23	23	"Prisoners of Love"	Rob Schiller	Story by : Regina Y. Hicks; Teleplay by : Peter Freedman & Stan Seidel	April 28, 1991	7T24	7.5
24	24	"Favorite Son"	Rob Schiller	Kermit Frazier	May 12, 1991	7T22	6.6

=== Season 2 (1991–92) ===
No. overall	No. in season	Title	Directed by	Written by	Original release date	Prod. code	Viewers (millions)
25	1	"Lester X"	Rob Schiller	Linda M. Yearwood	August 22, 1991	8T01	12.0
Lester is struggling with adolescence and a friend gives him The Autobiography of Malcolm X...and then adopts the views therein, renaming himself "Abdul X". Ultimately, Malcolm's philosophies fail to apply in Lester's everyday life, as the family does not know what to do, as does Lester's friend who gave him the book wonders what happened when Lester fails to appear for a party.
26	2	"Strange Bedfellows"	M.J. McDonnell	Stan Seidel	September 12, 1991	8T05	13.1
27	3	"Splendor in the Basement"	Rob Schiller	Story by : Robert Rabinowitz; Teleplay by : Michael J. Weithorn	September 15, 1991	8T04	7.8
28	4	"Yo' House, Mama: Part 1"	Rob Schiller	Kim Bass & Peter Freedman	September 22, 1991	8T06	9.0
29	5	"Yo' House, Mama: Part 2"	Rob Schiller	Kim Bass & Peter Freedman	September 29, 1991	8T07	8.6
30	6	"Presumed Guilty"	Dennis Erdman	Anne Convy	October 6, 1991	8T08	7.6
31	7	"Not My Sister, Brother"	Rob Schiller	Regina Y. Hicks	October 20, 1991	8T09	9.3
32	8	"Brotherly Love"	Rob Schiller	Michael J. Weithorn & Alan Uger	November 3, 1991	8T10	9.1
33	9	"Three for All"	M. J. McConnell	Story by : Stan Seidel; Teleplay by : Regina Y. Hicks & Peter Freedman	November 10, 1991	8T11	10.8
34	10	"Seems Like Old Times"	Rob Schiller	Alan Uger	December 8, 1991	8T03	9.9
35	11	"Broken Home: Part 1"	Rob Schiller	Stan Seidel & Peter Freedman	December 15, 1991	8T12	9.5
36	12	"Broken Home: Part 2"	Rob Schiller	Stan Seidel & Peter Freedman	December 22, 1991	8T13	8.6
37	13	"Readin', Ritin' and Runnin"	Rob Schiller	Kim Bass	December 29, 1991	8T14	9.0
38	14	"Photo Opportunity"	Michael J. Weithorn	Michael J. Weithorn	January 5, 1992	8T15	11.5
39	15	"Art Attack"	Rob Schiller	Regina Y. Hicks	January 12, 1992	8T16	10.9
40	16	"The Beat Goes On"	Rob Schiller	Linda M. Yearwood	February 2, 1992	8T17	11.3
41	17	"Half a Man"	Rob Schiller	Michael J. Weithorn	February 9, 1992	8T18	9.6
42	18	"In a Flash"	Carol Scott	Kim Bass	February 16, 1992	8T20	10.2
43	19	"Affirmative Reaction"	Kenneth R. Shapiro	Jeffrey Joseph	March 1, 1992	8T21	9.0
44	20	"Feelings Up"	Rob Schiller	Unknown	March 22, 1992	8T22	9.8
45	21	"Word to the Mother"	Rob Schiller	Story by : Peter Freedman; Teleplay by : Regina Y. Hicks & Stan Seidel	April 12, 1992	8T19	7.8

== Production ==
According to the show's creator, he claimed that the theme of interracial romance is one of the last remaining blatant taboos.
