= Double Platinum (film) =

- DVD cover
- Written by: Nina Shengold
- Directed by: Robert Allan Ackerman
- Starring: Diana Ross; Brandy; Christine Ebersole; Allen Payne; Brian Stokes Mitchell; Harvey Fierstein
- Music by: David Shire
- Country of origin: United States
- Original language: English

Production
- Executive producers: Diana Ross; Brandy; Sonja J. Norwood; Craig Zadan; Neil Meron
- Producer: Lynn Raynor
- Cinematography: Michael Fash
- Editor: Scott Vickrey
- Running time: 94 minutes
- Production companies: Storyline Entertainment; Anaid Film Productions; Norwood Entertainment Group; Columbia TriStar Television

Original release
- Network: ABC
- Release: May 16, 1999

Double Platinum is a 1999 American made-for-television musical drama film starring Diana Ross and Brandy. The film premiered on May 16, 1999, on ABC.

== Plot ==
In 1981, aspiring vocalist Olivia King performs at a small lounge in Atlanta. Following her performance, she is approached by a music executive who advises her of the myriad opportunities awaiting her in the larger music market of New York City. Initially, Olivia declines his offer, returning home to her husband Adam Harris, who dismisses the idea of her relocating and general career aspirations. Feeling depressed, conflicted, and trapped in her marriage, Olivia leaves her home in the middle of the night, promising to return for her daughter Kayla.

Eighteen years later in St. Louis, a 19-year-old Kayla has won a contest to meet Olivia, of whom Kayla is a huge fan. Following Olivia's concert, she and Kayla share a meal, during which Kayla details her own musical aspirations and invites Olivia to one of her performances at a small local club. When Kayla returns home from dinner, Adam is shocked to learn that the star Kayla got to meet was Olivia, but does not tell her the truth. The next day, Adam confronts Olivia at her concert venue, warning her to stay away from their daughter. At Kayla's performance, she worries that Olivia will not appear, but she does, shortly after Kayla begins to sing. Following the show, Olivia reveals to Kayla that she is her mother. This news leaves Kayla stunned and upset and quickly leaves the club. After an argument with Adam, she refuses to speak to Olivia, even when she offers to help her with her career. Kayla's best friend advises her to accept Olivia's help with her music career, as it is the least she owes her.

Kayla reluctantly agrees to go to New York with Olivia, who makes futile attempts to build a relationship with her daughter. Olivia introduces Kayla to her industry contacts, and with her strong recommendation and Kayla's talent, she is quickly signed to a recording contract. While beginning to record her first album, Kayla continues to live with Olivia in her penthouse apartment, with Olivia trying not to behave like an overbearing stage mother as she pursues success. Kayla then begins a steamy romance with a handsome older music executive, Ric Ortega whom her mother does not trust and warns against, but Kayla ignores her. Despite her growing success and initial hit single, "Have You Ever?", Kayla continues to harbor bitter feelings towards Olivia, which boil over during their record label's Grammy Party. After Kayla's performance, Olivia is asked to perform by the head of the label, causing Kayla to resent her for "stealing her spotlight". Kayla then moves in with Ric. However, after discovering that Ric revealed her true parentage to the press and betrayed her, Kayla breaks up their relationship. Kayla, feeling regretful, follows her mother to her cabin, where Olivia is finding refuge from the scandal. As they spend time at the cabin and truly communicate for the first time, the women begin to finally understand each other. Eventually, Kayla processes her feelings about her mother and her decision to leave the family. The movie closes with Olivia and Kayla returning to St. Louis for a concert Kayla is giving. As the show draws to a close, she calls her mother to the stage and they perform the duet, Love Is All That Matters. Kayla's friend and family look on from the audience.

The movie was a Nielsen ratings success, debuting at #16 for the week. Initially airing on ABC, the telefilm has since been syndicated by VH1, MTV, BET, Centric and TV One where it still is a recurrent favorite.

== Cast ==
- Diana Ross as Olivia King
- Brandy as Kayla Harris
- Christine Ebersole as Peggy
- Allen Payne as Ric Ortega
- Brian Stokes Mitchell as Adam Harris
- Harvey Fierstein as Gary Millstein
- Roger Rees as Marc Reckler
- Samantha Brown as Royana
- Ed Lover as Party Ardie
- Peter Francis James as Martin Holly
- Adriane Lenox
- Bernard Addison
- Debbie Matenopoulos as Herself

== Soundtrack ==
The songs featured in the film are from Brandy's and Diana's most recent albums:

Brandy (from Never Say Never in 1998) - Have You Ever, Almost Doesn't Count, and Happy.

Diana Ross (from Every Day Is a New Day in 1999) - He Lives In You, Until We Meet Again, Carry On, and Someone That You Loved Before.
