= Brandy Norwood =

American singer, songwriter and actress (born 1979)

Brandy
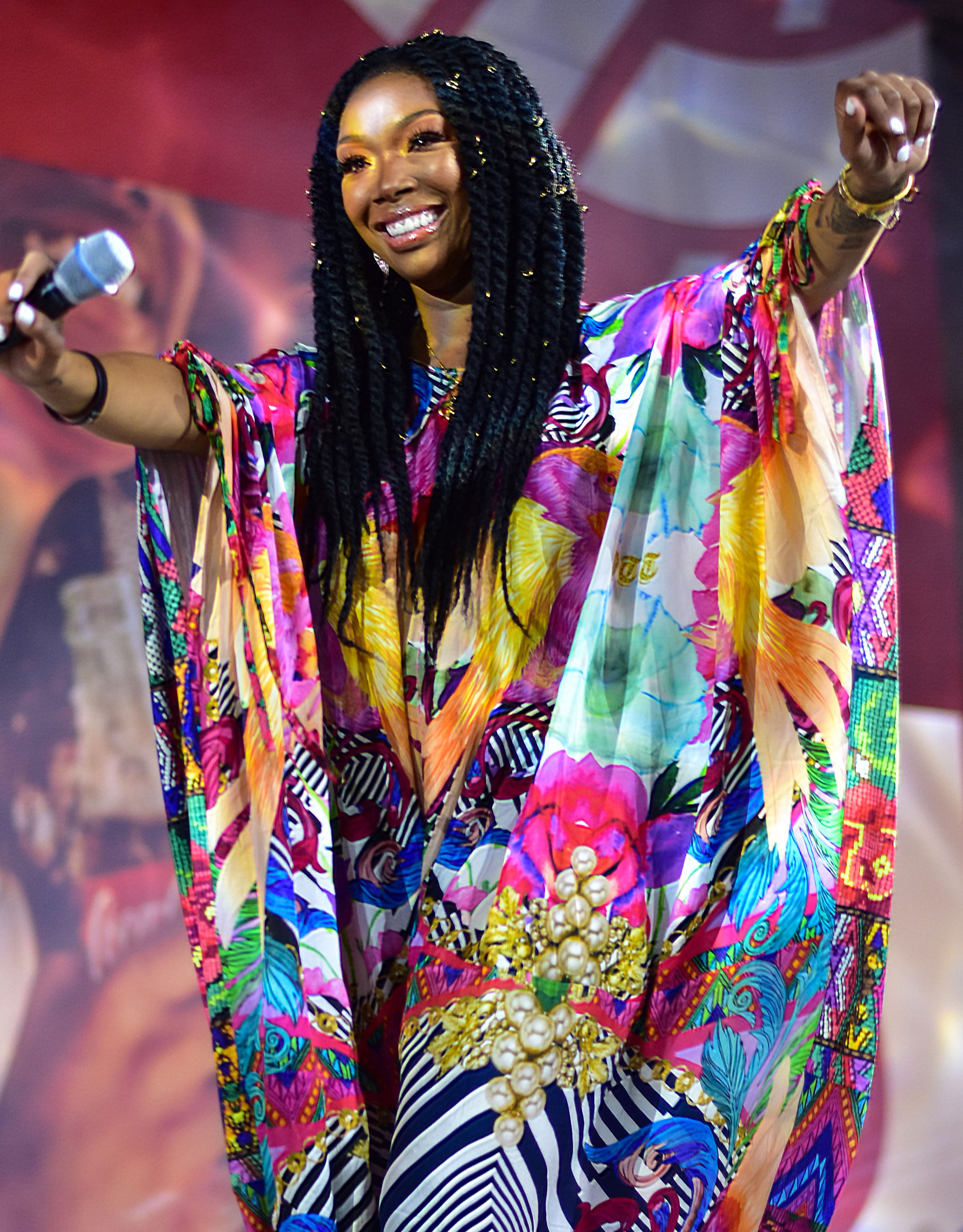
- Brandy performing in 2019
- Born: Brandy Rayana Norwood; February 11, 1979 (age 47); McComb, Mississippi, U.S.
- Other names: Bran'Nu; B Rocka; The Vocal Bible
- Occupations: Singer; songwriter; actress; author
- Years active: 1989–present
- Works: Discography; filmography; videography
- Partner: Big Bert (2001–2003)
- Children: Sy'Rai Smith
- Parents: Willie Norwood; Sonja Norwood
- Relatives: Ray J (brother)
- Awards: Full list
- Musical career
- Origin: Carson, California, U.S.
- Genres: R&B; pop; hip-hop; soul; gospel
- Instrument: Vocals
- Labels: Atlantic; Epic; Knockout; Chameleon; RCA; E1; Motown; Brand Nu

Brandy Rayana Norwood (born February 11, 1979), known mononymously as Brandy, is an American singer, songwriter, and actress. She is known for her intricate vocal riffs, and is regarded as an influential figure in contemporary R&B.

Born into a musical family in McComb, Mississippi, Brandy was raised in Carson, California, where she began her career as a backing vocalist for youth music groups. After signing to Atlantic Records, she rose to prominence in the mid-1990s with her debut album, Brandy (1994), which spawned the US Billboard Hot 100 top-ten singles "I Wanna Be Down", "Baby", and "Brokenhearted". She became a television star with her lead role on the UPN sitcom Moesha (1996–2001) and portrayed Cinderella in the television film Rodgers & Hammerstein's Cinderella (1997).

Brandy's best-selling second album, Never Say Never (1998), yielded two US number-one singles: "The Boy Is Mine" and "Have You Ever?". The former, a duet with Monica, spent thirteen weeks atop the Billboard Hot 100 and won both artists their first Grammy Award. Brandy ventured into more experimental sounds with the electronic-infused Full Moon (2002) and the ambient-inspired Afrodisiac (2004). She served as a judge on the first season of America's Got Talent in 2006 and explored pop on her fifth album, Human (2008). In 2010, Brandy returned to television as a contestant on the eleventh season of Dancing with the Stars. In 2012, she released her sixth studio album, Two Eleven. She made her Broadway debut in 2015, portraying Roxie Hart in the musical Chicago. Her most-recent studio albums, B7 and Christmas with Brandy, were released in 2020 and 2023, respectively.

Brandy is certified as selling 17 million albums and singles in the US, and she is the recipient of a Grammy Award and an American Music Award. Norwood received a star on the Hollywood Walk of Fame in March 2026, and published her memoir, Phases, that same month, which debuted at number one on the New York Times Bestseller list.

== Early life ==
Brandy Rayana Norwood was born on February 11, 1979, in McComb, Mississippi, the daughter of Willie Norwood, a gospel singer and choir director, and Sonja Norwood (née Bates), a district manager for H&R Block. Norwood is the older sister of entertainer Ray J. Through their mother, the two are third cousins of guitarist and singer Bo Diddley. Rapper Snoop Dogg has claimed that he and Norwood are cousins, though Norwood has stated she is unsure if they are actually related. She is also reported to be a cousin of wrestler Mercedes Moné and rapper Daz Dillinger.

Raised in a Christian household, Norwood began singing at an early age through her father's involvement in church ministry, performing her first gospel solo, a rendition of "Jesus Loves Me," at the age of two. In 1983, her parents relocated to Carson, California, a suburb of Los Angeles, after her father accepted a position as minister of music at Southside Church of Christ. There, she began her education at Ambler Avenue Elementary School before later attending Bancroft Junior High School. Norwood's interest in music and performing increased after becoming a fan of singer Whitney Houston at the age of seven. She subsequently enrolled at the Hollywood High Performing Arts Center, where she sought to pursue her artistic ambitions, though she encountered limited institutional support in securing audition opportunities.

In 1989, Norwood met producer Marcus Aurelius, who undertook efforts to promote her career but was unsuccessful in obtaining a contract with a major record label. By the age of eleven, she was participating in talent competitions and performing at public events as a member of a youth singing group. In 1990, she signed with Teaspoon Productions, headed by Chris Stokes, who arranged for her to record backing vocals for the R&B group Immature and facilitated the production of a solo demo following unsuccessful plans to place her in a girl group. In 1993, amid ongoing negotiations with East West Records, Norwood's parents organized a recording contract with the Atlantic Recording Corporation after auditioning for Darryl Williams, the company's director of A&R, and general manager Sylvia Rhone. To manage her daughter, Norwood's mother resigned from her job, while Norwood herself dropped out of Hollywood High School, and was tutored privately from tenth grade onward.

== Career ==
=== 1993–1997: Brandy and television stardom ===
During the early production stages of her debut album, Norwood was selected for a role in the short-lived ABC sitcom Thea, portraying the daughter of a single mother played by comedian Thea Vidale. Initially broadcast to high ratings, the series' viewership dwindled and ended up running for only one season, but earned her a Young Artists Award nomination for Outstanding Youth Ensemble alongside her co-stars. Norwood recalled that she appreciated the cancellation of the show as she was unenthusiastic about acting at the time, and the taping caused scheduling conflicts with the recording of her album. She stated, "I felt bad for everybody else but me. It was a good thing, because I could do what I had to do, because I wanted to sing."

Norwood's self-titled debut album was released in late September 1994 and peaked at number 20 on the U.S. Billboard 200. Critical reaction to Brandy was generally positive, with AllMusic writer Eddie Huffman declaring Brandy "a lower-key Janet Jackson or a more stripped-down Mary J. Blige [...] with good songs and crisp production." Anderson Jones of Entertainment Weekly asserted, "Teen actress Norwood acts her age. A premature effort at best, that seems based on the philosophy 'If Aaliyah can do it, why can't I?'." Brandy produced three top ten hits on the Billboard Hot 100, including "I Wanna Be Down" and "Baby", both of which reached the top of the Hot R&B Singles chart and were both certified platinum by the Recording Industry Association of America. "Brokenhearted", a duet with Wanya Morris of Boyz II Men, became a number 2 hit on the charts. The album earned Norwood two Grammy Award nominations for Best New Artist and Best Female R&B Vocal Performance the following year, and won her four Soul Train Music Awards, two Billboard Awards, and the New York Children's Choice Award. In 1995, she finished a two-month stint as the opening act on Boyz II Men's national tour, and contributed songs to the soundtracks of the films Batman Forever and Waiting to Exhale, with the single "Sittin' Up in My Room" becoming another top-two success. In 1996, Norwood also collaborated with Tamia, Chaka Khan, and Gladys Knight on the single "Missing You", released from the soundtrack of the F. Gary Gray film Set It Off. The single won her a third Grammy nomination in the Best Pop Collaboration with Vocals category.

In 1996, her short-lived engagement on Thea led Norwood to star in her own show, the UPN-produced sitcom Moesha. Appearing alongside William Allen Young and Sheryl Lee Ralph, she played the title role of Moesha Mitchell, a Los Angeles girl coping with a stepmother as well as the pressures and demands of becoming an adult. Originally bought by CBS, the program debuted on UPN in January 1996, and soon became their most-watched show. While the sitcom managed to increase its audience every new season and spawned a spin-off titled The Parkers, the network decided to cancel the show after six seasons on the air, leaving it ending with a cliffhanger for a scrapped seventh season. Norwood was awarded an NAACP Image Award for Outstanding Youth Actor/Actress for her performance. In 1997, Brandy, Ray J, and their parents started The Norwood Kids Foundation, which helps disadvantaged, at-risk youths in Los Angeles and Mississippi through the arts and self-help programs.

=== 1997–2001: Never Say Never and film career ===
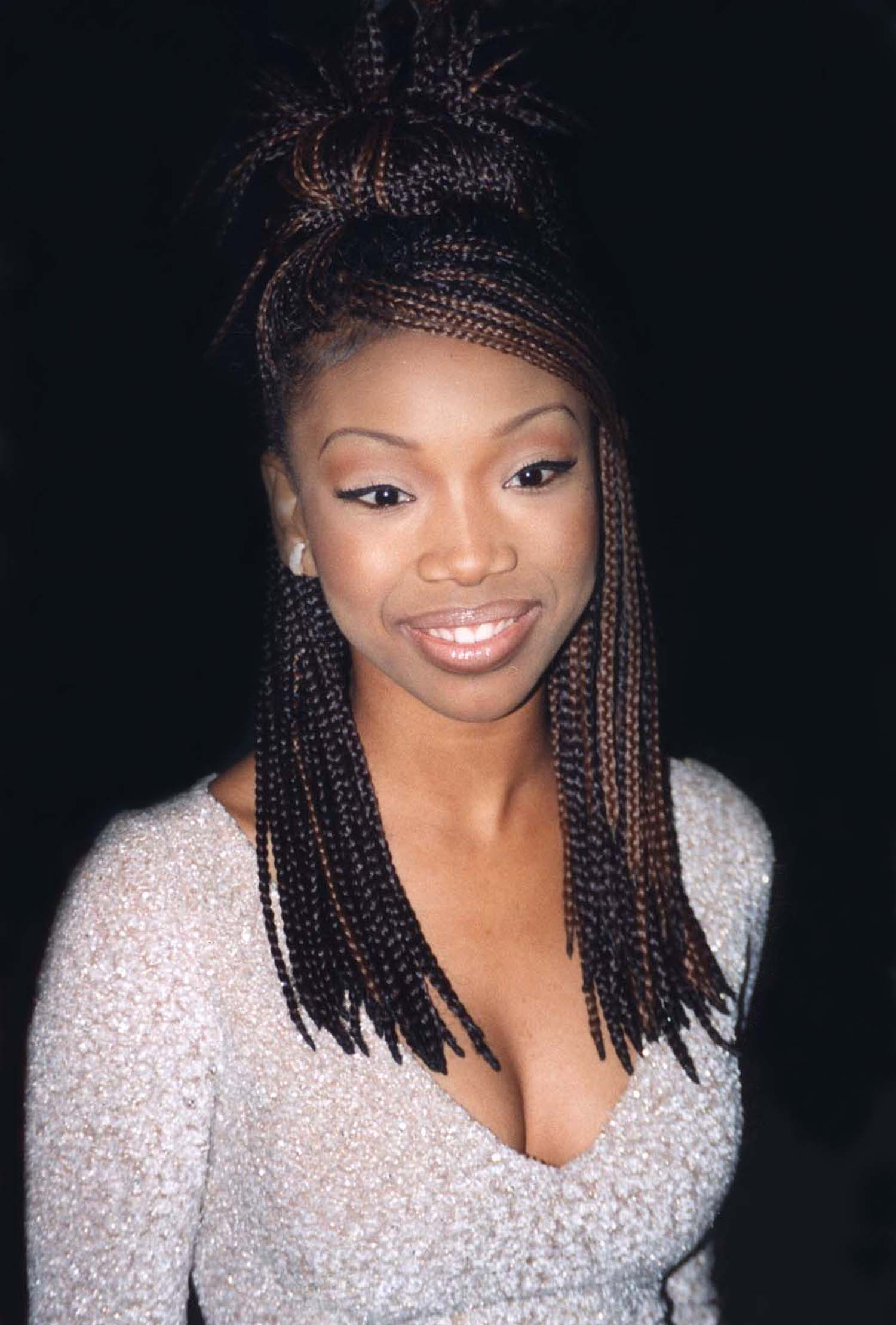
Norwood at the Essence Awards in 1997

In 1997, Norwood was hand-picked by producer Whitney Houston to play the title character in Rodgers and Hammerstein's television version of Cinderella featuring a multiracial cast that also included Jason Alexander, Whoopi Goldberg, and Houston. The two-hour Wonderful World of Disney special garnered an estimated 60 million viewers, giving the network its highest ratings in the time period in 16 years, and won an Emmy Award for Outstanding Art Direction for a Variety or Music Program the following year.

Fledgling producer Rodney "Darkchild" Jerkins was consulted to contribute to Norwood's second album Never Say Never. Norwood co-wrote and produced six songs for the record, including her first number 1 song on the U.S. Billboard Hot 100, "The Boy Is Mine", a duet with singer Monica that has become the most successful song by a female duo in the music industry. Exploiting the media's presumption of a rivalry between the two young singers, the song was one of the most successful records in the United States of all time, spending a record-breaking thirteen weeks atop the Billboard charts, and eventually garnering the pair a Grammy Award for Best R&B Performance by a Duo or Group with Vocal. Never Say Never was released in June 1998 and became Norwood's biggest-selling album, reaching number 2 on the Billboard 200. Critics rated the album highly, with AllMusic's Stephen Thomas Erlewine praising Norwood and her team for wisely finding "a middle ground between Mariah Carey and Mary J. Blige—it's adult contemporary with a slight streetwise edge." Altogether, the album spawned seven singles, including Norwood's second number 1 song, the Diane Warren-penned "Have You Ever?" To promote the album she went on the Never Say Never World Tour in 1999, consisting of shows in Europe, Asia, and the United States.

After backing out of a role in F. Gary Gray's 1996 film Set It Off, Norwood made her big screen debut in the supporting role of Karla Wilson in the slasher film, I Still Know What You Did Last Summer. The movie outperformed the original with a total of $16.5 million at its opening weekend, but critical reaction to the film was largely disappointing, with the film review site Rotten Tomatoes calculating a poor rating of 7% based on 46 reviews. Norwood, however, earned positive reviews for her "bouncy" performance, which garnered her both a Blockbuster Entertainment Award and an MTV Movie Award nomination for Best Breakthrough Female Performance. In 1999, she co-starred with Diana Ross in the telefilm drama Double Platinum about an intense, strained relationship between a mother and daughter. Shot in only twenty days in New York City, both Norwood and Ross served as executive producers of the movie which features original songs from their respective albums Never Say Never (1998) and Every Day Is a New Day (1999), as well as previously unreleased duets. The same year, Norwood headlined VH-1's Divas Live '99, alongside Whitney Houston, Tina Turner, and Cher.

After a lengthy hiatus following the end of Moesha, and a number of tabloid headlines discussing her long-term battle with dehydration, Norwood returned to music in 2001, when she and brother Ray J were asked to record a cover version of Phil Collins' 1990 hit "Another Day in Paradise" for the tribute album Urban Renewal: A Tribute to Phil Collins. Released as the album's first single in Europe and Oceania, the song became an instant international success overseas, scoring top-ten entries on the majority of all charts it appeared on. Norwood also contributed the Mike City track "Open" to the soundtrack from Osmosis Jones. The track remained unavailable on digital download and streaming sites until its rerelease twenty years later on October 8, 2021.

=== 2002–2005: Full Moon and Afrodisiac ===
Full Moon, Norwood's third album, was released in February 2002. It was composed of R&B and pop-oriented songs, many of them co-created with Jerkins, Warryn Campbell and Mike City. The album debuted at number 2 on the Billboard 200 and topped the Top R&B/Hip-Hop Albums chart. Its lead single "What About Us?" became a worldwide top-ten hit, and the album's title track was a Top 20 hit in the United States and the UK. Media reception was generally lukewarm, with Rolling Stone describing the album as "frantic, faceless, fake-sexy R&B." Within the coming year, Norwood and Robert "Big Bert" Smith began writing and producing for other artists such as Toni Braxton, Kelly Rowland, and Kiley Dean. Norwood's foray into reality television began in 2002 with the MTV series Diary Presents Brandy: Special Delivery; the show documented the final months of Norwood's pregnancy and the birth of her daughter Sy'Rai.

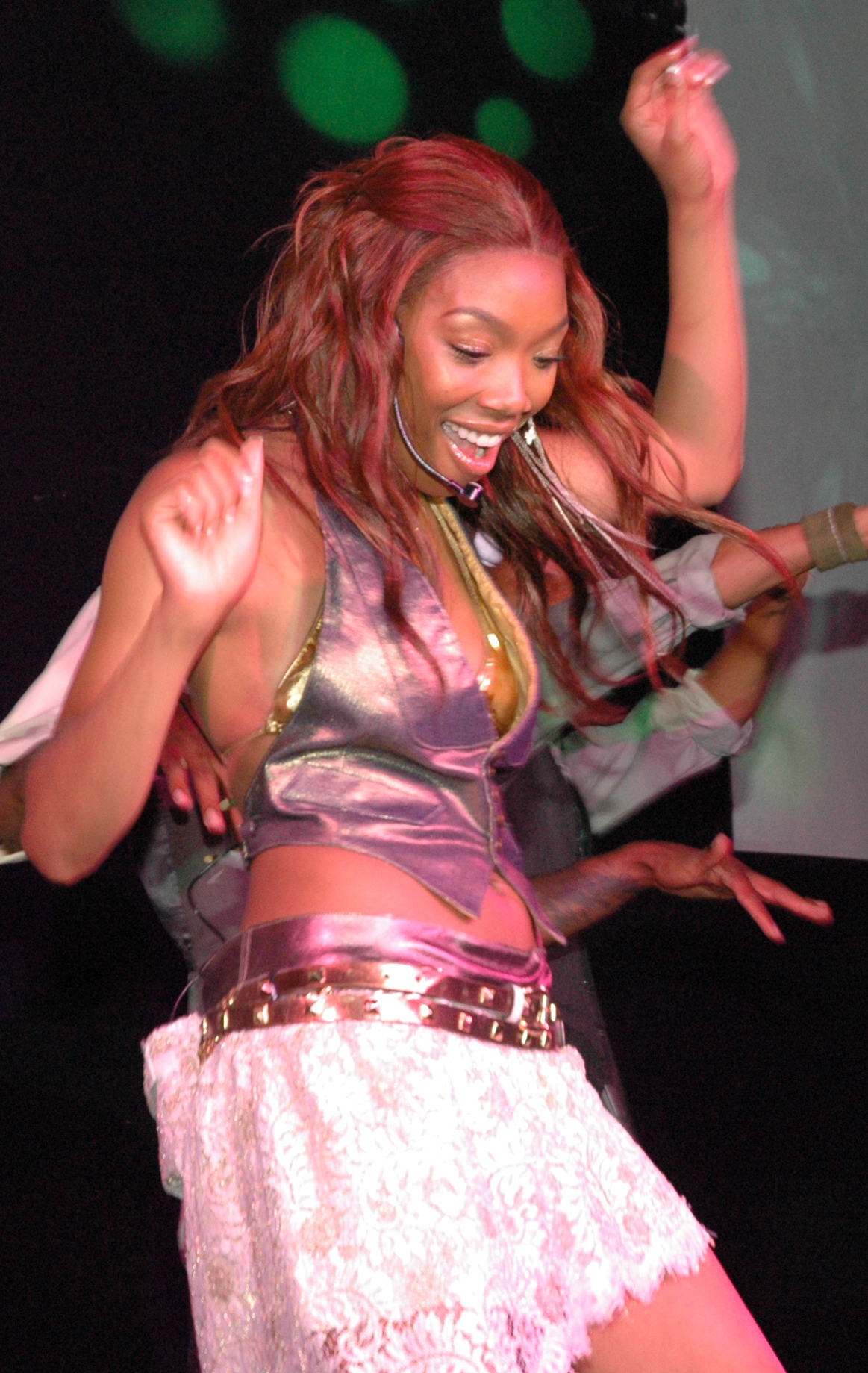
Norwood performing during Afrodisiac's album release party in New York City in July 2004.

Returning from yet another hiatus, Norwood's fourth album Afrodisiac was released in June 2004, amid the well-publicized termination of her short-lived business relationship with entertainment manager Benny Medina. Norwood ended her contract with his Los Angeles-based Handprint Entertainment after less than a year of representation following controversies surrounding Medina's handling of the lead single "Talk About Our Love", and failed negotiations of a purported co-headlining tour with R&B singer Usher. Despite the negative publicity, Afrodisiac became Norwood's most critically acclaimed album, with some highlighting the "more consistently mature and challenging" effect of Timbaland on Norwood's music, and others calling it "listenable and emotionally resonant", comparing it to "Janet Jackson at her best." A moderate seller, the album debuted at number 3 on the Billboard 200, and received certifications in the United States, Europe and Japan. "Talk About Our Love" reached number 6 in the United Kingdom, but subsequent singles failed to score successfully on the popular music charts. Later that year, she guest-starred as Gladys Knight in the third-season premiere of American Dreams, in which she performed "I Heard It Through the Grapevine".

After eleven years with the company, Norwood asked for and received an unconditional release from Atlantic Records at the end of 2004, citing her wish "to move on" as the main reason for her decision. Completing her contract with the label, a compilation album titled The Best of Brandy was released in March 2005. Released without any promotional single, it reached the top 30 in Australia, the United Kingdom and the United States, where the collection was appreciated by contemporary critics who noted the creativity of Norwood's back catalogue. Andy Kellman of AllMusic expressed, "This set, unlike so many other anthologies from her contemporaries, hardly confirms dwindling creativity or popularity." Thereupon she reportedly began shopping a new record deal under the auspices of Knockout Entertainment, her brother's vanity label.

=== 2006–2014: Human, acting return and Two Eleven ===
In February 2006, Norwood began appearing in a recurring role on UPN sitcom One on One, playing the sister to brother Ray J's character D-Mack. In June, she was cast as one of three talent judges on the first season of America's Got Talent, an amateur talent contest on NBC executive-produced by Simon Cowell and hosted by Regis Philbin. The broadcast was one of the most-watched programs of the summer, and concluded on August 17, 2006, with the win of 11-year-old singer Bianca Ryan. Norwood was originally slated to return for the second season in summer 2007, but eventually decided not to, feeling that she "couldn't give the new season the attention and commitment it deserved," following a fatal 2006 car accident in which she was involved. She was replaced by reality TV star Sharon Osbourne.

Norwood's fifth album, Human, was released in December 2008, produced by Toby Gad, Brian Kennedy, and RedOne. Distributed by Koch Records and Sony Music, the album marked Norwood's debut on the Epic Records label, and her reunion with long-time contributor and mentor Rodney Jerkins, who wrote and executive produced most of the album. Generally well received by critics, Human debuted at number 15 on the U.S. Billboard 200 with opening week sales of 73,000 copies. With a domestic sales total of 214,000 copies, it failed to match the success of its predecessors. While lead-off single "Right Here (Departed)" scored Norwood her biggest chart success since 2002's "Full Moon", the album failed to impact elsewhere, resulting in lackluster sales in general and the end of her contract with the label, following the controversial appointment of Amanda Ghost as president of Epic Records, and Norwood's split with rapper Jay-Z's Roc Nation management.

In December 2009, she officially introduced her rapping alter-ego Bran'Nu with two credits on Timbaland's album Timbaland Presents Shock Value 2, and was cast in the pilot episode for the ABC series This Little Piggy, also starring Rebecca Creskoff and Kevin Rahm, which was recast the following year.

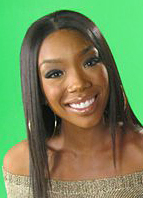
Norwood on the set of A Family Business in 2011

In April 2010, Norwood and Ray J debuted in the VH1 reality series Brandy and Ray J: A Family Business along with their parents. The show chronicled the backstage lives of both siblings, while taking on larger roles in their family's management and production company, R&B Productions. Executive produced by the Norwood family, the season concluded after eleven episodes, and was renewed for a second season, which began broadcasting in fall 2010. A Family Business, a compilation album with previously unreleased content from the entire cast was released on Saguaro Road Records in June 2011. Critics such as The Washington Post declared it an "awkward and adorable and really, really wholesome collection." While the album failed to chart, it produced three promotional singles, including the joint track "Talk to Me".

In fall 2010, Norwood appeared as a contestant on season 11 of the ABC reality show Dancing with the Stars, partnered with Maksim Chmerkovskiy. She ultimately placed fourth in the competition, which was a shock to the judges, viewers, studio audience, and other contestants that considered her one of the show's frontrunners throughout the entire competition. In August 2011, it was confirmed that Norwood had signed a joint record deal with RCA Records and producer Breyon Prescott's Chameleon Records. In September, a new talent show, Majors & Minors, created by musician Evan Bogart, premiered on The Hub. It followed a group of young performers age 10–16 and their chance to be mentored by some established artists such as Norwood, Ryan Tedder and Leona Lewis. Later that same year, Norwood returned to acting roles with recurring appearances on The CW's teen drama series 90210, and in the fourth season of the Lifetime's comedy series Drop Dead Diva, in which she played the role of Elisa Shayne.

In 2011, Norwood joined the cast of the BET comedy series The Game, playing the recurring role of Chardonnay, a bartender. She became a regular cast member by the next season. In February 2012, Norwood reteamed with Monica on "It All Belongs to Me", which was released as a single from the latter's album New Life. Norwood's own comeback single "Put It Down" featuring singer Chris Brown was released later that year. The song reached number 3 on Billboard's Hot R&B/Hip-Hop Songs chart, becoming her first top ten entry in ten years. Her sixth album Two Eleven, which was released in October, saw a return to her R&B sound, but with what Norwood described a "progressive edge". A moderate commercial success, it was viewed as a humble comeback from Norwood, reaching number 3 on the US Billboard 200, and the top of the Billboard US Top R&B/Hip-Hop Albums chart.

In March 2013, Norwood returned to film, joining an ensemble cast consisting of Jurnee Smollett-Bell, Lance Gross and Vanessa L. Williams in Tyler Perry's drama Temptation: Confessions of a Marriage Counselor. Norwood plays supporting character Melinda, a woman with secrets. The film received generally negative reviews from critics but became a moderate US box office success. In June 2013, Norwood signed with Creative Artists Agency, headquartered in Los Angeles, and in early 2014, she arranged a management deal with MBK Entertainment with CEO Jeff Robinson. In July, she was also inducted as an honorary member of Alpha Kappa Alpha sorority. The same month, Norwood released a cover version of Coldplay's song "Magic" to her TwitMusic account; it peaked at number 1 on Billboard's Trending 140 chart. Also in 2014, Norwood made guest appearances on VH1's Love and Hip Hop: Hollywood and the TV Land sitcom The Soul Man. At the 2014 BET Hip Hop Awards, she reunited with Queen Latifah, MC Lyte, and Yo-Yo to perform the hip hop remix of "I Wanna Be Down" in celebration of its 20th anniversary.

=== 2015–2020: Broadway and B7 ===
After finishing the filming of the final season of The Game, Norwood made her Broadway debut in the musical Chicago, in which she played the lead role of Roxie Hart, beginning in April 2015. Although initially a six-week run, her stint was extended until August 2015, prompting Norwood to reprise the role on several occasions in 2016 and 2017. Also in 2015, Norwood appeared on British house duo 99 Souls's mashup single "The Girl Is Mine", for which she re-recorded her vocals from "The Boy Is Mine". The song reached the top five in Belgium and the United Kingdom as well as the top 40 on other international charts, where it became her highest-charting single in years.

In January 2016, Norwood co-executive produced and starred as the lead in the BET sitcom Zoe Ever After, a multi-camera romantic comedy about a newly single mom stepping out of the shadow of her famous boxer ex-husband. While it debuted to respectable ratings, Norwood decided not to return to the show, and it was soon after cancelled. The same month, Norwood released the standalone single "Beggin & Pleadin" through her own label Slayana Records, after receiving a positive response to initially unveiling the track on SoundCloud. That February, Norwood announced her Slayana World Tour, which highlighted stops in both Europe and Oceania. Her first headlining tour in eight years, it was ended ahead of schedule on June 30 after Norwood was hospitalized due to exhaustion. In March, Norwood sued Chameleon Entertainment Group and its president, Breyon Prescott, after the label reportedly refused to allow her to record and release new albums. After the lawsuit was thrown out of court due to one particular clause, Norwood filed another one several months later, demanding $270,000 in compensation and a "court declaration that she is contractually freed from Chameleon." Both parties reached a settlement in 2017.

In November 2016, Norwood became the second recipient of the Lady of Soul Award at the Soul Train Music Awards. Her stripped-down nine-minute song medley was met with praise. Two months later, Norwood competed with her brother Ray J on the FOX reality cooking series My Kitchen Rules. In July 2018, Norwood became a series regular on the Fox musical drama television series Star. She played the role of Cassie, starting as a recurring role in the second season, and remained a series regular until the series' ending in 2019. The same year, she appeared on "Optimistic", a Sounds of Blackness cover that preceded the self-titled debut of supergroup August Greene, consisting of Common, Robert Glasper and Karriem Riggins, as well as on Dutch DJ's Lucas & Steve's "I Could Be Wrong", a dance-heavy rework of her 1994 single "I Wanna Be Down" that became a minor hit on the dance charts.

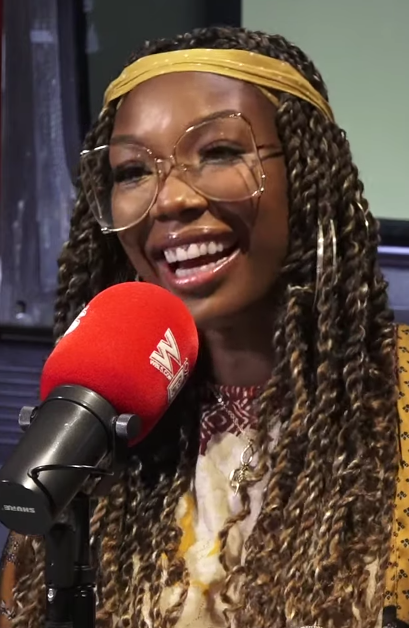
Norwood in 2019

In 2019, Norwood was honored with the BMI President's Award at the BMI R&B/Hip-Hop Awards, organized by Broadcast Music, Inc. In June, she appeared on Canadian singer Daniel Caesar's second album Case Study 01, lending vocals to their duet "Love Again". Released as a single, it earned them a Grammy Award nomination for Best R&B Performance at the 62nd awards ceremony and reached the top of the Billboard Adult R&B Songs chart, becoming Norwood's first song to do so. In September 2019, she released the buzz single "Freedom Rings" which was released to coincide with the 25th anniversary of her self-titled debut album. in August 2019, Norwood revealed she had been in the recording studio working on a song with Justin Timberlake, Ray J and Pharrell Williams. However, the song remained unreleased.

Norwood's seventh album B7, her first album in eight years, was released in July 2020. Her first project as an independent artist, it was released through her own label Brand Nu Inc., with distribution handled by eOne Music. A departure from her previous work, Norwood co-wrote and co-produced the majority of the album, which was chiefly produced by Darhyl Camper. The release was preceded by lead single "Baby Mama" featuring Chance the Rapper. B7 debuted at number 12 on the Billboard 200, also reaching number 2 on UK R&B Albums. The album received generally positive reviews from critics, with numerous publications including it on their lists of the best albums of 2020, and earned a nomination in the Album of the Year category at the 2020 Soul Train Awards.

In August 2020, Norwood and Monica battled in the webcast series Verzuz. Filmed at Tyler Perry Studios in Atlanta, Georgia, it was watched by a record-breaking 1.2 million viewers on the Instagram live stream alone. BET listed the moment as number 1 on its list of "The 20 Most OMG Viral Moments of 2020". Two months later, Norwood performed a medley at the Billboard Music Awards, which were held at the Dolby Theatre in Los Angeles, California.

=== 2021–2024: Queens and Christmas with Brandy ===
In March 2021, Norwood was chosen by John Legend as a mentor on the twentieth season of the singing competition series The Voice. Also that month, Norwood collaborated with Disney on the single "Starting Now", the theme song for the music special Disney Princess Remixed — An Ultimate Princess Celebration, released in August 2021. Also that month, Norwood, alongside Naturi Naughton, Eve and Nadine Velazquez, joined the cast of ABC's music drama series Queens in which she played one-fourth of a veteran hip-hop group. Norwood recorded several new songs for the series which debuted to reviews largely positive reviews in October 2021; with Variety praising the quartet's musical offering, calling their raps "sharp and distinct […] making clear their talent as both individuals and a swaggering collective," but was not renewed the following year.

In March 2022, Norwood released "Nothing Without You", a duet alongside daughter Sy'Rai, recorded for the soundtrack to the comedy film Cheaper by the Dozen (2022). In April, singer Mariah Carey revealed "The Roof (When I Feel the Need)", a re-recorded and re-imagined version of her 1998 single "The Roof (Back in Time)" featuring new vocals from Norwood, for the former's course on MasterClass. In October 2022, Norwood was nominated for Best Global Act at the All Africa Music Awards 2022 for "Somebody's Son", her collaboration with Nigerian singer Tiwa Savage.

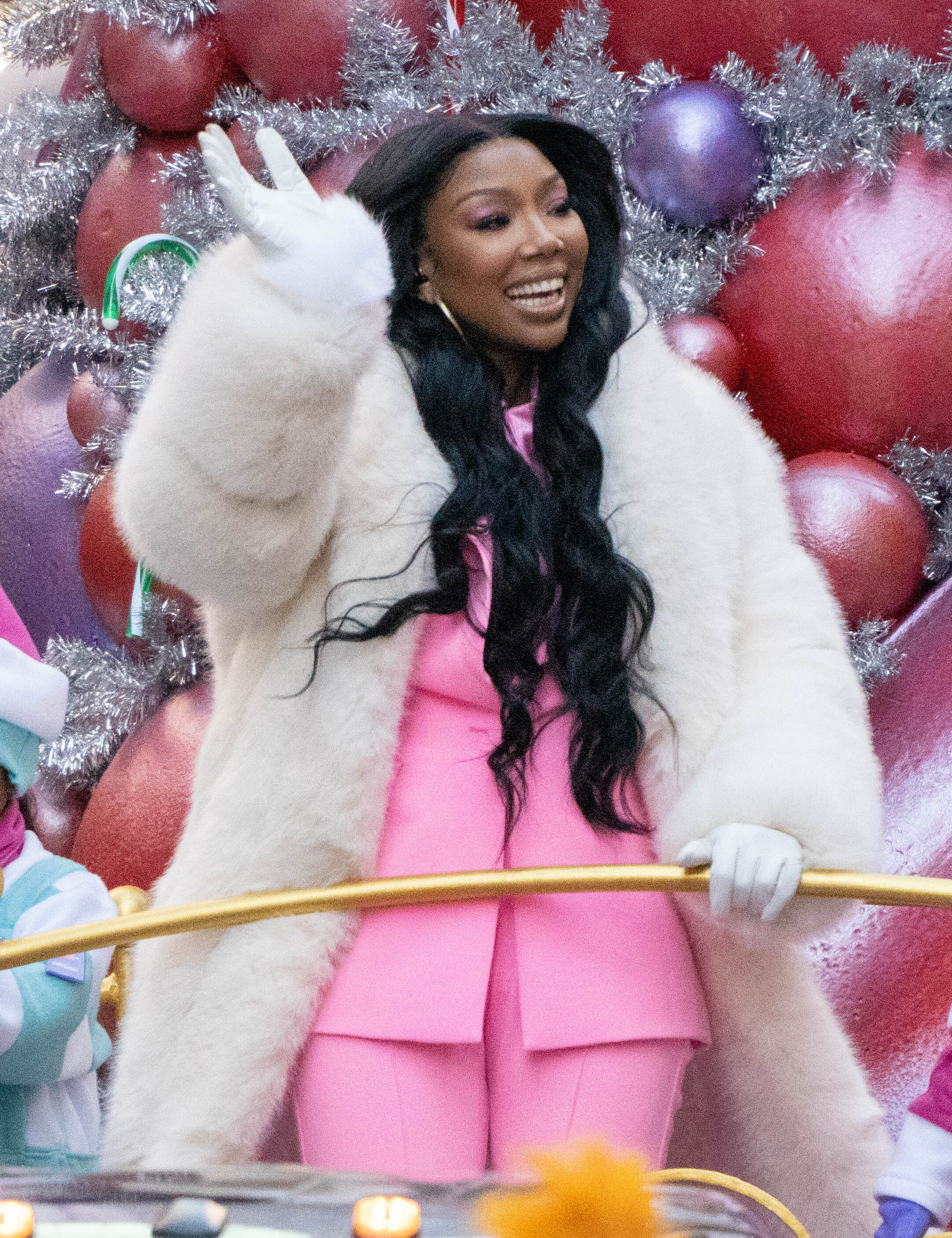
Norwood at Macy's Thanksgiving Day Parade in 2023

In April 2023, Norwood's daughter, Sy'Rai, confirmed that her mother would be the vocal and executive producer on her forthcoming debut EP. In November 2023, Norwood released her eighth album, Christmas with Brandy, a collection of six original songs and six cover versions of Christmas standards. The project marked her major label return after signing with Motown Records in June 2022 and reached the top thirty on the US Top Holiday Albums chart. Its release coincided with the release of the Netflix Christmas comedy film Best. Christmas. Ever!, directed by Mary Lambert and starring Norwood alongside Heather Graham, Jason Biggs, and Matt Cedeño. While the film became hit in its first week on the streaming service, it earned largely negative reviews from critics and audiences, with The Guardian calling it one of "worst" comedies of the season. On November 23, 2023, Norwood performed "Someday at Christmas" at the 2023 Macy's Thanksgiving Day Parade.

On February 4, 2024, Norwood performed at the 66th Annual Grammy Awards; Burna Boy's single, "Sittin' on Top of the World", which heavily sampled Norwood's own "Top of the World", had been nominated for Best Melodic Rap Performance. On June 7, Norwood made a cameo appearance as a news anchor in Ariana Grande's "The Boy Is Mine" music video, alongside Monica. On June 21, 2024, Grande released "The Boy Is Mine (Remix)", which features both Norwood and Monica. In July 2024, Descendants: The Rise of Red, a standalone sequel to the Descendants franchise, was released on Disney+, in which Norwood reprised the role of Cinderella, and appeared on the film's soundtrack, contributing vocals to "Love Ain't It" alongside Rita Ora, Malia Baker and Kylie Cantrall, and "So This Is Love" alongside Paolo Montalban. A24's The Front Room, a psychological horror film from directors Max and Sam Eggers and based on the original short story by Susan Hill, was released in September 2024, starring Norwood as Belinda; the film grossed just over $3.8million worldwide. Norwood's performance in the film garnered positive reviews from critics.

=== 2025–present: The Boy Is Mine Tour and Phases memoir ===
In July 2025, Norwood made a cameo appearance in a mid-credits scene in the 2025 sequel film I Know What You Did Last Summer, reprising the role of Karla Wilson from 1998's I Still Know What You Did Last Summer. From October to December 2025, she embarked on her The Boy Is Mine Tour, her first co-headlining tour with Monica. Produced by Black Promoters Collective and initially scheduled for 24 arena dates, the tour was later expanded to 32 shows and earned widespread critical acclaim, with reviewers highlighting the duo's seamless blend of nostalgia, cohesive artistic chemistry, and extensive catalogs of hits. In November 2025, Norwood starred in the Lifetime holiday film Christmas Everyday, alongside her daughter Sy'Rai, who made her acting debut portraying her younger sister. Also executive produced by Norwood, the Roger M. Bobb-directed film earned her an Outstanding Actress nomination at the 57th NAACP Image Awards.

In January 2026, Norwood received the Black Music Icon award at the fourth annual Recording Academy Honours, presented by The Recording Academy's Black Collective during the week of the 68th Annual Grammy Awards. On March 30, 2026, she received a star on the Hollywood Walk of Fame. The following day, her memoir, Phases, co-written with Gerrick Kennedy, was released by Hanover Square Press. The book reached the top of the New York Times Best Seller list in April 2026. Norwood reprised her role of Cinderella in Descendants: Wicked Wonderland, the fifth installment of the Descendants franchise. She sang the theme song to the Netflix reboot of A Different World, which premiered in September 2026; the single was released on September 24, 2026. On September 16, 2026, Norwood's collaboration with singer Josh Levi, "Say It (Remix)", was released; the single was featured on the latter's extended deluxe album, Hydraulic: Fueled Up. On September 24, 2026, Norwood's collaboration with Pynk Beard, a reimagined version of "Hit the Road Jack", was released as a single. In November 2026, after their performance on Dancing With the Stars, Brandy alongside Monica announced their The Boy Is Mine Las Vegas residency.

== Artistry ==
=== Voice and style ===
Norwood has been classified by some to have a contralto vocal range. Her voice has often been described as soft, raspy, and husky by music critics and Norwood herself. Music critic and Slant Magazine writer Andrew Chan describes Norwood's vocal tone as having "an unusual mix of warmth and cold, hard edges". He further describes her vocal quality, saying, "Like little else in pop-music singing, Brandy's subtle manipulation of timbre and texture rewards close listening. [...] Her main claim of technical virtuosity has always been her long, cascading riffs, a skill many R&B die-hards revere her for."

Terry Sawyer of PopMatters writes on this skill, remarking, "While it's been said that Brandy's voice isn't exactly a barn burner, it's not mentioned enough that she does more than enough with what she's got. She never leaves her voice hanging in spotlit scarcity, folding its variegated terracing, whispering out the lead track, shouting in the back-up, and piling each song with enough interlocking sounds to create the tightly packed illusion of vocal massiveness." In 2023, Rolling Stone ranked Brandy at number 193 on its list of the 200 Greatest Singers of All Time.

Norwood's initial sound on her eponymous debut album was "street-oriented" R&B, that incorporated elements of hip hop and pop-soul. She sang about love while also highlighting other topics such as, "tributes to her little brother ("Best Friend"), God ("Give Me You"), the perfect man ("Baby") and older crooners like Aretha and Whitney ("I Dedicate")". On her second album Never Say Never, she went for a more adult contemporary oriented direction while maintaining "a slight streetwise edge". Her third album Full Moon saw Norwood, and her then-creative partner Rodney Jerkins, experiment with blending her previous R&B sounds with futuristic, forward-thinking productions, including influences of 2-step garage and electro-funk. Along with her style, her voice had gone through an evolution, with her light, girlish voice becoming much deeper, warmer, and smokier than it had been throughout the 1990s. The lyrics also reflected the change, as the album explored more adult, sexual topics and focused on both physical and emotional aspects of an intimate relationship.

In 2004, her recent motherhood, life experiences, and growing affinity for British rock band Coldplay, caused her to shift toward a more experimental vision for her fourth album Afrodisiac. The album, a collaboration with producers Timbaland and Kanye West, utilized the distinctive illbient aesthetic, which fuses ambient pop, dub, and breakbeat soundscapes with progressive sampling methods. A four-year hiatus and a few life-changing occurrences caused Norwood to return to the music industry in late 2008 with Human, her fifth album, which discussed topics of love, heartache and honesty. Experiencing a career and personal rejuvenation in 2012, Norwood was eager to scale back her previous album's pop style and return to R&B on her sixth album Two Eleven. The album was a melding of both Norwood's 1990s R&B sound and the bass-heavy trends of post-2000s contemporary hip-hop.

=== Influences ===
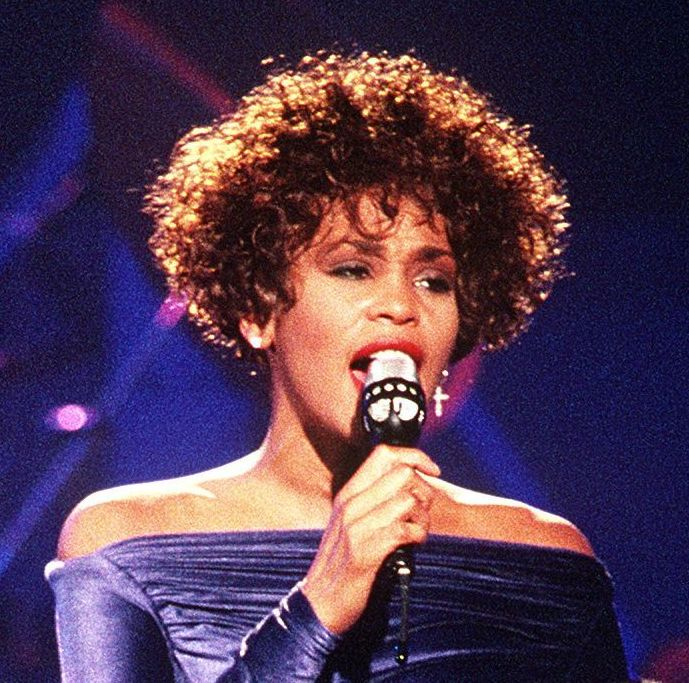
Norwood has cited Whitney Houston (pictured) as her idol and greatest influence. Houston eventually became Norwood's mentor throughout her career.

Since the start of her career, Norwood has named Whitney Houston as her most prominent music and entertainment influence. Early in her career, she would often describe Houston as her "idol", crediting her voice, music, and performances as critical to her, both personally and professionally. In a 2014 interview, Brandy stated that, "as a professional musician, I would say that Whitney Houston is the greatest voice of all time." She elaborates, saying "She was always the idea for me. I wanted to be like her, sing like her, and do everything she was doing." Beginning in the late 1990s, Houston would evolve as a personal friend and mentor to Brandy, with Houston nicknaming herself as Norwood's "godmother".

Norwood also names her father, vocal coach Willie Norwood, as instrumental to her discovery and development as a musician. She exclaims that her dad "taught me everything that I know [about singing]". About her dad, Norwood states: "I grew up singing in church with my dad, where he was the musical director and we sang gospel songs in a cappella almost exclusively. He bought me my first 4-track tape recorder. At first, I didn't like my own voice, but he encouraged me to embrace the unique qualities of my voice."

While developing her own style and vocal sound, Norwood would credit gospel-jazz singer Kim Burrell, new age artist Enya, and English singer-songwriter Sade as major influences. In speaking about them, she said, "... it was listening to those women, along with my own creative voice, that helped me to find my niche, my own sound." Norwood has also noted several other musical inspirations, including Michael Jackson, Mariah Carey, Boyz II Men, the Clark Sisters, Stevie Wonder, Aretha Franklin, Coldplay, Janet Jackson, Aaliyah, Timbaland, and her brother Ray J.

Over the course of her acting career, Norwood has noted Lucille Ball, Jenifer Lewis, Gabrielle Union, Niecy Nash, and Kim Fields as being integral to her development as an actress, and the discovery of her strength in comedic roles.

== Legacy ==
The RIAA has certified Brandy as selling 10.5 million albums. By 2009, her album sales had reached 8.6 million. In 2008, Billboard ranked her song "The Boy Is Mine" third on a special The 40 Biggest Duets of All Time listing. In 1999, Billboard ranked Norwood among the top 20 of the Top Pop Artists of the 1990s. In 2010, Billboard included Norwood in their Top 50 R&B and Hip Hop Artists list of the past 25 years. Norwood was one of the youngest artists nominated for the Grammy Award for Best New Artist. Her second album Never Say Never appeared in the "Top 100 Certified Albums" list by the RIAA.

Norwood's vocal stylings have had a significant impact on the music industry, most notably with contemporary R&B, pop and gospel genres, where some have referred to her as the "Vocal Bible". Her work has influenced numerous artists, including Ariana Grande, Keyshia Cole, Jhené Aiko, Eric Bellinger, Chris Brown, Rihanna, Normani, and Kehlani.

Songwriter Sean Garrett credits Brandy's vocal work on the album Full Moon for his approach to writing, saying "I take a lot from what [Brandy] and Rodney did on the Full Moon album. I was extremely impressed with it and I always try to outdo that album". B.Slade spoke of the album, commenting Full Moon single-handedly changed the vocal game. "It has been the template for vocal choices and background vocal arrangements [for years]." R&B singer Melanie Fiona, especially admired the singer's work on that album. Neo soul singer India.Arie often cites the album, particularly the song "He Is" as being the template for a wide array of singers." The oft-praised vocal work on the album sparked the idea of Norwood gaining the subjective nickname the "vocal bible".

Afrodisiac has been credited as one of predecessors to the alternative R&B subgenre. In a 2014 music and fashion conversation with NPR, singer and model Solange discussed the album, saying "Brandy is really the foundation of a lot of this very innovative, progressive, experimental R&B. Brandy really influenced a lot of that. Frank Ocean will say it. Miguel will say it." In an interview with Malcolm Ohanwe, Miguel revealed that he was a "huge fan growing up", stating that Brandy had "killed it from the first album".

American neo soul singer Erykah Badu noted that her 1997 debut album, Baduizm, was partly influenced by Norwood's debut album, while Barbadian singer Rihanna said of her 2007 album Good Girl Gone Bad, "[Brandy] really helped inspire that album. I listened to [Afrodisiac] every day [while in the studio]." Kelly Rowland cited Norwood, who also wrote and produced for Rowland's debut album, as one of the inspirations for her second album Ms. Kelly (2007). John Frusciante, guitarist for Red Hot Chili Peppers, cited Norwood as the "main inspiration" behind the guitar work on Red Hot Chili Peppers' 2006 album, Stadium Arcadium. When discussing the work on her debut project H.E.R., singer H.E.R., who worked with the producer DJ Camper, revealed that Brandy was a "huge inspiration" to her, and that her being inspired Brandy impacted her musical output.

Norwood has made her impact in the film and television industry as well. Norwood was the first African American to play the role of Cinderella. Her role as Cinderella in the 1997 film inspired many African American actors. Speaking on the role, Keke Palmer said "I feel like the reason I'm able to do this [becoming the first African American Cinderella on Broadway] is definitely because Brandy did it on TV". Norwood's TV-show Moesha on UPN was also one of the longest-running Black sitcoms of all time. On stage, Norwood made Broadway history along with co-star Lana Gordan by becoming the first black co-leads in Chicago the Musical in 2017.

== Other ventures ==
Norwood has had many endorsements in her career. In 1999, she became a CoverGirl, appearing in a number of commercials. She also represented the brands Candie's in 1998 and DKNY in the Spring of 2000. In the late 1990s Norwood was represented by Wilhelmina Agency, one of the leading modeling agencies in the industry. In 1999, Mattel released the Brandy Doll. The doll featured Norwood in a reddish orange blouse and orange long skirt. Next to this, the Holiday Brandy Doll was released in 2000 along with another "Brandy Doll". Millions of the dolls were sold and they were one of the biggest selling toys for Mattel. In 2005, Brandy became the spokesperson for Ultima, a company for hair weaves and wigs. As of 2014, she no longer represents them.

=== Philanthropy ===
In 1996, Norwood, along with her brother Ray J, created the Norwood Kids Foundation. Its goal is to "use performing arts as a catalyst to shape the youth of today into self-confident, disciplined, responsible, and caring individuals capable of making a positive impact in their communities." In 1999, Brandy was the first international spokesman person for youth by UNICEF. She is an avid supporter of the Make A Wish Foundation and RAINN. In 2000, Brandy donated $100,000 to 2000 WATTS, an entertainment community center founded by singer and actor Tyrese Gibson in the underprivileged community of Watts, Los Angeles, California.

In 2008, Brandy teamed up with shoe company Skechers' "Nothing Compares to Family" campaign. In 2010, Norwood became involved with Get Schooled, a national non-profit mobile phone calls by celebrities to wake up students for school. In 2014, Norwood teamed up with "text4baby", which spreads health and wellness to expecting moms via text message, and became an honorary co-chairman of the 2014 Unstoppable Foundation. In 2018, she also appeared in a PSA for the American Heart Association and Hands-Only CPR with fellow Chicago the Musical cast members.

== Personal life ==
=== Relationships ===
Norwood attended Hollywood High School but studied with a private tutor beginning in tenth grade. In 1996, she had a brief relationship with future Los Angeles Lakers player Kobe Bryant, whom she accompanied to his prom at Lower Merion High School in Ardmore, Pennsylvania. She also dated Boyz II Men lead singer Wanya Morris, whom she called her "first love". Morris, who is over five years older, reportedly ended their relationship a month before her nineteenth birthday. Also during their work on the Never Say Never album, she briefly dated rapper Mase.

During the production of her album Full Moon in mid-2001, Norwood became romantically involved with producer Robert "Big Bert" Smith. They kept their relationship secret until February 2002, when Norwood announced that she was expecting her first child. A year after the birth of their daughter, Norwood and Smith separated. In 2004, Smith revealed that the pair had never been legally wed, but that they had pretended to marry to preserve Norwood's public image. Norwood responded that she regarded her relationship with Smith as a "spiritual union and true commitment to each other," though she later confirmed Smith's statement and justified her actions with the pressure of having to be a role model.

In 2004, Norwood began a relationship with NBA guard Quentin Richardson, who was then playing for the Los Angeles Clippers. The couple became engaged in July 2004, but Norwood ended their 14-month engagement in September 2005. It was reported that Norwood had to get a tattoo of Richardson's face on her back transformed into a cat. In 2010, she briefly dated rapper Flo Rida. At the end of 2012, Norwood became engaged to music executive Ryan Press. In April 2014, Norwood called off her engagement with Press following their breakup earlier that year.

=== Health ===
Following the release of her seventh album B7, fans speculated on the meaning behind the album's closing track, "Bye BiPolar". While Norwood does not have bipolar disorder, according to notes that the singer wrote to accompany the album, "Bye BiPolar" is a metaphor for her love life and discussing the way that her mental health struggles have been exacerbated by toxic relationships. Norwood told the New York Post: "I have not been diagnosed as bipolar [...] but I've had moments where trauma has caused me to not be myself, and I felt at a point that I could've experienced moments of that." In an interview with The Grio, Norwood said, "I've dealt with depression in the most severe ... like severe depression. I've dealt with trauma. I've dealt with PTSD. I've gone through a lot and I had to overcome a lot, but I had to overcome everything that I've overcame by doing the work," turning to therapy, prayer, journaling and meditation.

=== I-405 collision ===
On December 30, 2006, while driving on the 405 Freeway in Los Angeles, Norwood struck a Toyota driven by 38-year-old Awatef Aboudihaj, who later died from her injuries at the L.A. Providence Holy Cross Medical Center. Law enforcement officials later reported that Norwood was driving her car at 65 miles per hour (105 km/h) and did not notice that vehicles ahead of her had slowed considerably. Her vehicle then collided with the rear of Aboudihaj's, causing the Toyota to strike another vehicle before sliding sideways and impacting the center divider. As the Toyota came to a stop, it was hit by yet another vehicle. A source in the California Highway Patrol later reported that Aboudihaj actually struck the car in front of her and then slammed on her brakes before Norwood made contact. The sudden stop caused Norwood to hit Aboudihaj's car. As confirmed, toxicology reports showed that Aboudihaj had "slight traces" of marijuana in her system at the time of the crash.

Norwood was not arrested. There were multiple lawsuits filed against Norwood, all of which were ultimately settled out of court by her attorney Ed McPherson. Aboudihaj's parents filed a $50 million wrongful death lawsuit against Norwood. Initially set to go to trial in April 2009, the lawsuit was eventually cancelled as Norwood had settled out of court with Aboudihaj's parents. Aboudihaj's husband also filed a lawsuit against Norwood, suing her for an undisclosed amount of financial relief to cover medical and funeral expenses, as well as legal costs and other damages. In February 2009, he rejected his part of a $1.2 million settlement offer, but settled in November.

The couple's two children received $300,000 each. Two other drivers who were involved settled with Norwood for undisclosed amounts. In May 2009, Norwood stated, "The whole experience did completely change my life, and I can say that I think I'm a better person from it. You know, I still don't understand all of it and why all of it happened, but I definitely have a heart, and my heart goes out to everyone involved. I pray about it every single day, and that's all I can really say on the subject."

== Discography ==
Studio albums

- Brandy (1994)
- Never Say Never (1998)
- Full Moon (2002)
- Afrodisiac (2004)
- Human (2008)
- Two Eleven (2012)
- B7 (2020)
- Christmas with Brandy (2023)
- Brandyfied (2026)

== Tours and residency ==
=== Headlining ===
- Never Say Never World Tour (1999)
- Human World Tour (2009)
- Slayana World Tour (2016)

=== Opening act ===
- II World Tour (1995)

=== Co-headlining ===
- The Boy Is Mine Tour (2025) (with Monica)

=== Residency ===
- The Boy Is Mine:Las Vegas Residency (2027) (with Monica)

== Stage ==
=== Broadway ===
- Chicago (April–August 2015; August 2017)

=== Regional ===
- Chicago (2016) (the Hollywood Pantages Theatre in Los Angeles)
- Chicago (2017) (the Kennedy Center in Washington, D.C.)

== See also ==
- Brandy videography
- List of songs recorded by Brandy
