= My Kitchen Rules (American TV series) =

- Genre: Cooking
- Judges: Curtis Stone; Cat Cora
- Country of origin: United States
- Original language: English
- No. of seasons: 1
- No. of episodes: 8

Production
- Executive producers: Conrad Green; Kenny Rosen
- Production company: 7 Beyond

Original release
- Network: Fox
- Release: January 12 – March 2, 2017

Related
- My Kitchen Rules

My Kitchen Rules is an American competitive cooking reality show, based on the original Australian format of the same name. The eight-episode series premiered on January 12, 2017 and is produced by 7 Beyond and broadcast on the Fox network.

The program sees teams of two take turns hosting a dinner party at their home, attempting to impress their fellow competitors as well as professional judges Curtis Stone and Cat Cora. Teams with the lowest score after each round are eliminated.

In 2012, American-based production company Kinetic Content acquired the format rights for an American version of the show during the MIPTV Media Market event in Cannes, France, however that series never eventuated.

== Teams ==
Unlike the original Australian format of the program, the American adaptation involved celebrity competitors.

Team members	Relationship	Status
Andrew Dice Clay; Valerie Silverstein	Married	Winners
Lance Bass; Diane Bass	Mother and son	Runners-up
Brandi Glanville; Dean Sheremet	Friends	Eliminated
Brandy Norwood; Ray J	Siblings	Eliminated
Naomi Judd; Larry Strickland	Married	Eliminated

== Ratings ==
Viewership and ratings per episode of My Kitchen Rules
No.	Title	Air date	Rating/share (18–49)	Viewers (millions)	Ref.
1	"Instant Restaurant: Brandy & Ray J / Lance & Diane"	January 12, 2017	0.9/3	2.51	
2	"Instant Restaurant: Naomi & Larry / Brandi & Dean"	January 19, 2017	0.8/3	2.47	
3	"Instant Restaurant: Andrew & Valerie and Sudden Death Cook-off"	January 26, 2017	0.7/3	2.15	
4	"Brandi vs. Brandy at David Arquette"	February 2, 2017	0.7/3	2.18	
5	"Dice vs. Lance at Kelly Osbourne's"	February 9, 2017	0.9/3	2.46	
6	"Leah Remini Gets Artsy"	February 16, 2017	0.7/3	2.08	
7	"L.A. Rams Tackle the Final 3"	February 23, 2017	0.7/3	2.14	
8	"Champion is Crowned"	March 2, 2017	0.8/3	2.20	
