= Thea (TV series) =

- Genre: Sitcom
- Created by: Bernie Kukoff
- Starring: Thea Vidale; Adam Jeffries; Brandy Norwood; Jason Weaver; Brenden Jefferson; Cleavant Derricks; Yvette Wilson
- Theme music composer: Freddie Washington; Benjamin Wright
- Composer: Kurt Farquhar
- Country of origin: United States
- Original language: English
- No. of seasons: 1
- No. of episodes: 19

Production
- Executive producers: Bernie Kukoff; Andrew Susskind; Thea Vidale
- Producers: Tom Devanney; Mary Ellen Jones
- Running time: 22–24 minutes
- Production companies: Castle Rock Entertainment; Columbia Pictures Television

Original release
- Network: ABC
- Release: September 8, 1993 – February 16, 1994

Thea is an American sitcom that premiered September 8, 1993, on ABC, and ended on February 16, 1994, for a total of 19 episodes. Produced by Castle Rock Entertainment and Columbia Pictures Television and starring stand-up comedian Thea Vidale, Thea marked the first time an African American woman comedian was the star of a series named after her.

== Synopsis ==
Set in Houston, Texas, Thea Vidale stars as title character Thea Armstrong-Turrell, a widowed mother of four children who works as a supermarket cashier during the day and runs a single-chair beauty salon called Styles by Thea from her home at night.

Although the show initially attracted high ratings, viewership declined steadily over the course of the season, and the series was canceled after 19 episodes.

== Cast ==
=== Main ===
- Thea Vidale — Thea Armstrong-Turrell
- Adam Jeffries — Jarvis Turrell Jr., Thea's first son
- Jason Weaver — Jerome Turrell, Thea's second son
- Brandy Norwood — Danesha Turrell, Thea's daughter
- Brenden Jefferson — James Turrell, Thea's third son
- Cleavant Derricks — Charles Russell, Lynette's husband
- Yvette Wilson — Lynette Armstrong-Russell, Thea's younger sister and Charles's wife

=== Recurring ===
- Kenny Ford, Jr. — Leonard Thurman
- Miguel A. Nunez Jr. — Rickey
- Arvie Lowe, Jr. — Otis
- Wesley Jonathan - Riddick

== Episodes ==
| No. | Title | Directed by | Written by | Original release date | Prod. code | US viewers (millions) |
|---|---|---|---|---|---|---|
| 1 | "Pilot" | Jay Sandrich | Bernie Kukoff | September 8, 1993 | 080101 | 20.7 |
Thea has a hectic routine: working at the supermarket checkout by day, dressing hair by night, and supervising her four demanding children. Jarvis gives his mother $25 which he earned delivering sandwiches during his school lunch hour, but she insists that he keep the money and eat his own lunch in the cafeteria. Danesha returns from taking James clothes-shopping, and James blabs that he had to keep trying on ill-fitting clothes while she talked on the phone to her new boyfriend Leonard, whom she's meeting at the library later. Thea insists that Leonard pick Danesha up at home so she can inspect him. Meanwhile, Jerome is supposedly at a friend's house doing a geography assignment, but Thea finds his geography book and knows that he has been at the video arcade instead, and grounds him before she leaves to attend a memorial service. It's the night of a big video-game competition, and Jerome sneaks out despite Jarvis' attempts to keep him at home, then must face Thea's wrath.
| 2 | "Jerome Makes the Grade" | Jay Sandrich | Tom Devanney | September 10, 1993 | 080104 | 15.9 |
Jerome is failing English because of his desperate attempts to make the school basketball team. When Thea forces him to finish his book report on To Kill a Mockingbird, he doesn't make the team but gets a B on his report. Meanwhile, Danesha attempts to submit a video to America's Funniest Home Videos.
| 3 | "Dirty Laundry" | Jay Sandrich | Bill Bryan | September 15, 1993 | 080103 | 23.4 |
The washing machine breaks down, which means endless trips to the laundromat. Meanwhile, Danesha's boyfriend is in hot water after he kisses another girl, and Thea puts him through the wringer before he can come clean with Danesha.
| 4 | "How I Got Over" | Jay Sandrich | Michelle Jones | September 29, 1993 | 080107 | 14.9 |
Thea gets a chance to train for manager, but Jerome plans a boxing-match party while Thea is at her night-school class.
| 5 | "To Tell the Truth" | Jay Sandrich | Don Siegel | October 6, 1993 | 080108 | 15.4 |
Jarvis lets his younger brother drive and they get into an accident, but the boys don't tell their mother who was behind the wheel. To punish them, Thea cooks up a scheme with Lynette, who pretends to have lost her wedding ring in her trash, now at the bottom of a very fragrant dumpster.
| 6 | "Artie's Party" | Chuck Vinson | Tom Devanney & Bill Bryan | October 13, 1993 | 080109 | 15.4 |
Conflict brews when Arthur invites Jarvis to his bachelor party but Thea thinks he's too young to attend.
| 7 | "Here Comes Mr. Gordon" | Linda Day | Dan Cohen & F.J. Pratt | October 20, 1993 | 080106 | 17.0 |
Thea acquires an unwanted admirer.
| 8 | "Birthday Girl" | Jay Sandrich | David Kukoff | November 3, 1993 | 080111 | 14.6 |
On her birthday, Thea's treasured gift of tickets to a Motown reunion concert go unused when her boss calls her in to work a replacement shift.
| 9 | "Danesha Loooves Leonard" | John Bowab | Teri Schaffer | November 17, 1993 | 080105 | 15.1 |
When Danesha's romance with Leonard disrupts the household, Jarvis and Jerome hatch a plan to split them up.
| 10 | "Mama, I'm Full" | Chuck Vinson | Michelle Jones | November 24, 1993 | 080112 | 14.8 |
Thea must work at the market on Thanksgiving, so she entrusts Danesha with the cooking of the family feast.
| 11 | "Good Stock" | Chuck Vinson | Bernie Kukoff & Michelle Jones | December 1, 1993 | 080113 | 22.2 |
Jerome finds he has a knack with stocks, which leads Thea to lend him a real-investment stake.
| 12 | "A Christmas Story" | Chuck Vinson | Tom Devanney | December 15, 1993 | 080114 | 14.9 |
Jarvis procrastinates putting up the Christmas lights because he's afraid of heights.
| 13 | "Danesha Project" | Tony Singletary | Elias Davis & David Pollock | December 22, 1993 | 080115 | 14.2 |
Danesha teams up with Cliff Croverd, the most popular guy in school, for a social-studies project on single parents.
| 14 | "Hair Today, Gone Tomorrow" | Chuck Vinson | Tom Devanney & Bill Bryan | January 5, 1994 | 080110 | 17.6 |
Thea finds herself in a hairy situation when she can't afford mandated improvements to her in-home salon and an inspector wants to close it down.
| 15 | "Who's Zoomin' Who" | Jay Sandrich | Teri Schaffer | January 12, 1994 | 080116 | 15.0 |
Marcella uses Jerome to make her boyfriend Dwayne jealous, while Jerome uses the relationship to meet his own needs. Meanwhile, Thea decides to fix her own plumbing after Charles can't make time to do it for her.
| 16 | "Of Fish and Men" | John Bowab | Lenore G. Bunt | January 19, 1994 | 080117 | 17.3 |
Danesha is paired with a basketball star for a school project, but he tries to pass all the work off on her.
| 17 | "Call Me Thea" | Paul Kreppel | Gary Hardwick | February 2, 1994 | 080119 | 15.6 |
Thea takes a day off, leaving the kids to do the household chores. She visits her favorite barbecue joint, Mickey's, but Mickey has died and new owner Roy's cooking doesn't come close, so Thea joins the restaurant as the head chef.
| 18 | "T.C.B." | Paul Kreppel | Michelle Jones | February 9, 1994 | 080118 | 16.8 |
Barbecue-sauce chef Thea is offered a restaurant partnership.
| 19 | "The Pie Queen and the Loan Duck" | John Bowab | Teri Schaffer | February 16, 1994 | 080120 | 13.6 |
Jarvis needs space and privacy to study for his college SATs. Meanwhile, Thea is outraged when she learns that Mitch Mallard, the banker who holds the mortgage on the diner, eats there for free.

== Syndication ==
Reruns of the show aired on BET from 1994 to 1998 and returned to the same channel on Mother's Day in 2008, but stopped airing a few months later.

== Ratings ==
- Episode 1: 13.6/22, 20.7 million, #11
- Episode 2: 10.4/20, 15.9 million, #29
- Episode 3: 15.0/24, 23.4 million, #10
- Episode 4: 10.1/17, 14.9 million, #52
- Episode 5: 10.5/17, 15.4 million, #52
- Episode 6: 10.3/16, 15.4 million, #53
- Episode 7: 11.2/18, 17.0 million, #40
- Episode 8: 10.0/16, 14.6 million, #57
- Episode 9: 9.7/15, 15.1 million, #55
- Episode 10: 9.3/16, 14.8 million, #56
- Episode 11: 13.6/21, 22.2 million, #23
- Episode 12: 9.6/16, 14.9 million, #54
- Episode 13: 8.5/14, 14.2 million, #61
- Episode 14: 11.4/17, 17.6 million, #45
- Episode 15: 10.2/16, 15.0 million, #58
- Episode 16: 11.5/17, 17.3 million, #47
- Episode 17: 10.1/16, 15.6 million, #59
- Episode 18: 10.7/16, 16.8 million, #48
- Episode 19: 9.2/14, 13.6 million, #46

== Award nominations ==
| Year | Award | Category | Recipient | Result |
|---|---|---|---|---|
| 1994 | Young Artist Awards | Outstanding Youth Ensemble in a Television Series | Brandy Norwood, Jason Weaver, Brenden Jefferson and Adam Jeffries | Nominated |
