= Brokenhearted (Brandy song) =

1995 single by Brandy

Single by Brandy

from the album Brandy
- Released: August 8, 1995
- Recorded: 1994
- Studio: Human Rhythm (Los Angeles)
- Length: 5:52 (album version); 4:47 (Soulpower mix)
- Label: Atlantic
- Songwriters: Keith Crouch; Kipper Jones
- Producers: Keith Crouch; Kipper Jones

Brandy singles chronology
"Best Friend" (1995)	"Brokenhearted" (1995)	"Sittin' Up in My Room" (1995)

Boyz II Men singles chronology
"Vibin'" (1995)	"Brokenhearted" (1995)	"Hey Lover" (1995)

Music video
- "Brokenhearted" on YouTube

"Brokenhearted" is a song by American recording artist Brandy. It was written and produced by Kipper Jones and Keith Crouch for her self-titled debut album (1994). Requested by then Atlantic Records head Sylvia Rhone, the song was developed late into the production of the album. Pressured to meet Rhone's deadline for Brandy, Kipper suffered from a case of writer's block during the early writing process but eventually came up with the idea for a sweet, morose R&B ballad that deals with the aches of a teenager's first heartbreak.

A re-recorded duet version of the song featuring additional vocals from Boyz II Men singer Wanya Morris and produced by Danish production duo Soulshock and Karlin was released as the album's fourth and final single in August 1995. Music critics were divided on whether the remix improved on the album version. On the charts, "Brokenhearted" peaked within the top 10 in New Zealand and on the US Billboard Hot 100, becoming Norwood's third domestic top-10 hit. It has since been certified gold in the United States by the Recording Industry Association of America (RIAA).

A music video depicting Norwood daydreaming about doing a duet with Morris inside a big mansion was directed by Hype Williams and filmed inside the Oheka Castle on the North Shore of Long Island in July 1995. At the 1996 MTV Video Music Awards, "Brokenhearted" received a nomination in the Best Cinematography in a Video category. Norwood and Morris performed their version on numerous occasions, including the 1996 Billboard Music Awards, The Oprah Winfrey Show, and several other televised appearances.

== Background ==
"Brokenhearted" was written and produced by Keith Crouch and Kipper Jones. Requested by then Atlantic Records head Sylvia Rhone after hearing their work on "I Wanna Be Down" and "Baby," Kipper suffered from a case of writer's block during the early writing process. Crouch used a Roland TD-77 unit to simulate the wind and harpsichord-type sounds as well as a Yamaha TG77 synthesizer workstation to produce the upright bass sounds on the ballad. Inspired by singer Prince's song "Condition of the Heart" (1985) with its "little nuances and the little sounds and effects," he blended the bass with a lead synth line, playing it an octave lower than what had initially planned to craft a sound that he described as "like outer space a little bit." The album version of "Brokenhearted" was recorded in a single take; Norwood remembered during the release of The Best of Brandy in 2005: "There's a funny story behind the recording of that song! I wanted to go to Six Flags but the producers kept saying, ‘Only after you finish recording!' I sang my heart out [...] I wanted to go to Six Flags so bad! You can hear the passion in my voice!"

The idea for a duet version of "Brokenhearted" originally came up while Norwood was on a two-month stint as the opening act on all-male vocal harmony group Boyz II Men's national tour in early 1995. Both artists were on the airplane on the way to another city, when band member Wanya Morris got his hands on a copy of Brandy's debut album: "I was listening to her album on the plane and I was like, 'Yo, we should do a duet of 'Brokenhearted'," Wanya told MTV News the following year. Atlantic Records consulted Danish record producers Soulshock and Karlin to record a new version of the song with both singers at Boyz II Men's studio in Philadelphia. In a 2020 interview, Carsten Schack commented on the process: "Wanya and Brandy went into the studio together and they had a good connection. We just caught that moment when she was singing. She was another one with an amazing tone. I think our approach was to take the remixes very seriously and trying to make it better than the original."

== Critical reception ==
Larry Flick from Billboard magazine remarked that the song "drops the tempo to a spare ballad pace, giving the tempo ingenue the space to stretch and explore the soulful parameters of her voice." He found that the duet version with Morris "adds muscle to its already considerable programming power. Will waft over several formats like a cool, refreshing breeze." Flick's Billboard colleague Chris Williams felt that "the album rendition has more of a thump to it, though it's still stripped down and minimalist. This is a teenager singing about how life goes on post-breakup. But the lyrics are so grown, they could've easily been sung by artists like Tamia or Deborah Cox." Steve Baltin from Cash Box stated that "this has "smash" written all over it." He added that Brandy and Morris "could make it to the top of the charts by accident. But this single's inevitable success will be no accident, as one should expect a major push behind this soulful ballad. A straight ahead R&B number, the song features some nice harmonies as well as impressive singing on the part of the two superstars. One can't help but be impressed by the way they work together."

In his review for Entertainment Weekly, Dimitri Ehrlich wrote, "Featuring saccharine sentiments set to turgid arrangements, the seamlessly produced, soulless ballad 'Brokenhearted' is something like Lawrence Welk meets Mary J. Blige. If you wanna be down, as Brandy's first hit proclaimed, a teaming with Milquetoast crooner Wanya Morris [...] is the wrong way to go." Pan-European magazine Music & Media said, "The SoulPower mix of this album track is one of those "put this on while you make love" songs, invented by the likes of Marvin Gaye and Barry White. The 16-year-old singer doesn't sound heartbroken enough to break the love-making mood." Rylee Jackson, writing for The Nevada Sagebrush, called it another "example of a song with an excellent remix that has continued to be more relevant than the original. Featuring Boyz II Men lead singer Wanya Morris, the track is the typical somber R&B slow jam, but also depicts the positive side of heartbreak [...]." Oprah Daily's Grant Rindnerfelt wrote that "Brandy said that she wasn't feeling particularly inspired the day she recorded 'Brokenhearted', but you'd have a hard time telling as she stretches into her upper and lower registers with conviction and bounces off the booming, soulful piano." A review for Vibe, Lela Olds wrote that "whether listening to the album version or the remix featuring then-boyfriend and Boyz II Men member Wanya Morris, you have no choice but to get your fingers snapping when listening to 'Brokenhearted'."

== Music video ==
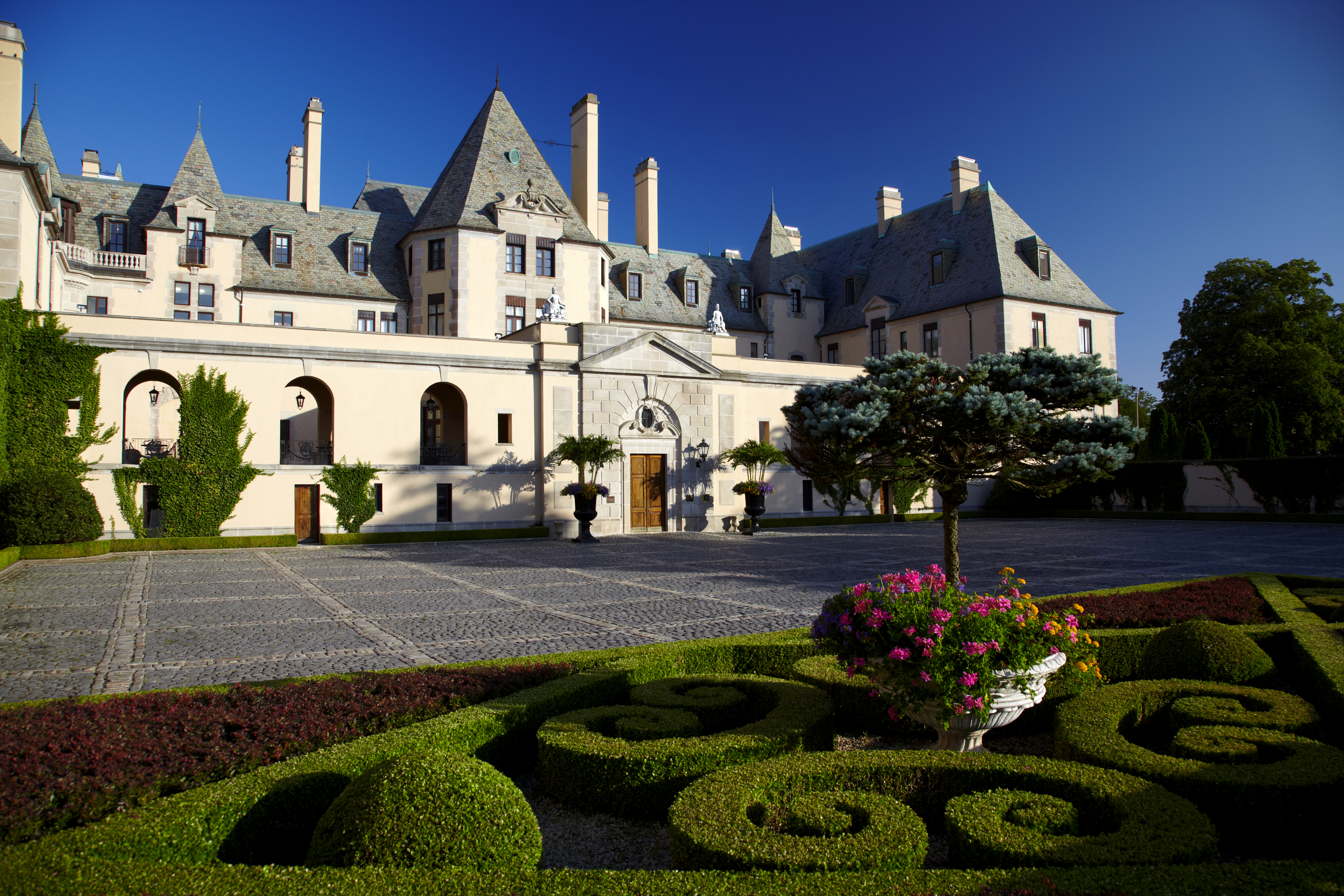
"Brokenhearted" was filmed at the Oheka Castle on Long Island.

Norwood reunited with American director Hype Williams, who had previously directed her videos for "I Wanna Be Down (Human Rhythm Hip Hop Remix)" and "Baby," to film a visual for "Brokenhearted." Filming took place inside the Oheka Castle, a mansion located on the North Shore of Long Island, in West Hills, New York. Much of the scenes were filmed on the estate's third and fourth floor before their restoration several years later. Norwood and Morris who each shot their scenes separately, do not appear in any sequence together in the video though "Brokenhearted" blends several of their scenes.

The music video begins with shots of a large tree and Norwood laying on a blanket in a field. When asked about the treatment of the video, Norwood told MTV News during the shooting: "It's basically a dream, because of course this is not reality. I can't afford a mansion right now, so it's like I fall asleep and I dream about doing a duet with Wanya and I'm in this big mansion wearing these grown clothes, big beautiful Whitney Houston–type clothes." At the 1996 MTV Video Music Awards, "Brokenhearted"'s director of photography Martin Coppen was nominated for Best Cinematography in a Video but lost to Declan Quinn for his work on the video for The Smashing Pumpkins's "Tonight, Tonight" (1995).

== Track listings ==
All tracks written by Keith Crouch and Kipper Jones.

Cassette single
No.	Title	Producer(s)	Length
1.	"Brokenhearted" (Soulpower Mix)	Crouch; Soulshock & Karlin^{[a]}	4:49
2.	"Brokenhearted" (LP Version)	Crouch	5:52

CD single
No.	Title	Producer(s)	Length
1.	"Brokenhearted" (Soulpower Mix)	Crouch; Soulshock & Karlin^{[a]}	4:49
2.	"Brokenhearted" (Soulpower Groove Mix)	Crouch; Soulshock & Karlin^{[a]}	4:47
3.	"Brokenhearted" (Acoustic Mix)	Crouch	5:18
4.	"Brokenhearted" (LP Version)	Crouch	5:52

Notes

- ^{^a} denotes additional producer

== Personnel ==
Personnel are adapted from the liner notes of Brandy.

- Keith Crouch – producer, recording, writer
- Sherree Ford-Payne – backing vocals
- Brian Gardner – mastering
- Kipper Jones – writer
- Booker T. Jones – mixing
- Brandy Norwood – backing vocals, lead vocals

== Charts ==
=== Weekly charts ===
Chart (1995)	Peak position
Canada Retail Singles (The Record)	22
New Zealand (Recorded Music NZ)	6
US Billboard Hot 100	9
US Dance Singles Sales (Billboard)	11
US Hot R&B/Hip-Hop Songs (Billboard)	2
US Rhythmic Airplay (Billboard)	5
US Cash Box Top 100	7

=== Year-end charts ===
Chart (1995)	Position
US Billboard Hot 100	77
US Hot R&B Singles (Billboard)	40
US Cash Box Top 100	47

== Certifications ==
Region	Certification	Certified units/sales
United States (RIAA)	Gold	500,000^{^}
^{^} Shipments figures based on certification alone.

== Release history ==
List of release dates, showing region, release format, label and reference
Region	Date	Format	Label	Ref.
United States	August 8, 1995	Rhythmic contemporary radio	Atlantic	
United States	August 15, 1995	Contemporary hit radio	Atlantic	
United States	August 22, 1995	CD; cassette	Atlantic	
