= The Videos (Brandy video) =

Video by Brandy
- Released: November 14, 2000
- Recorded: September 1994–September 1999
- Genre: R&B, Pop, Soul, Hip Hop
- Length: 53:00
- Label: Atlantic
- Director: Joseph Khan, Martin Weisz, Hype Williams, Kevin Bray, Matthew Rolston, Keith Ward, Paul Hunter

Brandy chronology
The Videos (2000)	VH1 Divas 1999 (2000)

The Videos is the first compilation DVD by Brandy which includes all her videos from 1994 to 1999 except "Missing You" and the remix video for "U Don't Know Me". It was released on VHS videotape in 1999 in the U.S., and re-issued in 2000 as a DVD; in Germany, the DVD was released in 2005.

== Track listing ==
1. Baby
2. Brokenhearted (Soulpower Mix feat. Wanya Morris)
3. I Wanna Be Down
4. Have You Ever?
5. Sittin' Up in My Room
6. Best Friend
7. The Boy Is Mine (Duet with Monica)
8. Almost Doesn't Count
9. Top of the World (feat. Ma$e)
10. I Wanna Be Down (Remix feat. Queen Latifah, Yo-Yo, and MC Lyte)
11. U Don't Know Me (Like U Used To)

== The videos ==
Year	Title	Director(s)
1994	"I Wanna Be Down"	Keith Ward
1995	"Baby"	Hype Williams
1995	"Best Friend"	Matthew Rolston
1995	"Brokenhearted" (with Wanya Morris)	Hype Williams
1995	"Sittin' up in My Room"	Hype Williams
1998	"The Boy Is Mine" (with Monica)	Joseph Kahn
1998	"Top of the World" (featuring Mase)	Paul Hunter
1998	"Have You Ever?"	Kevin Bray
1999	"Almost Doesn't Count"	Kevin Bray
1999	"U Don't Know Me (Like U Used To)"	Martin Weisz
