= The Videos =

The Videos can refer to the following:

- The Videos (group), 1950's doo-wop group
- The Videos (Brandy video)
- The Videos (Dannii Minogue video)
- The Videos (Roxette video)
- The Videos 1989–2004, compilation by Metallica
- The Videos 1992–2003, compilation by No Doubt
- The Videos 1994–2001, compilation by Dave Matthews Band
- The Videos 86>98, compilation by Depeche Mode
- The Videos, Vol. 1, compilation by Winger

== See also ==
- The Videosingles, compilation by Tears for Fears
