= Tommy Organ =

American musician, songwriter and producer

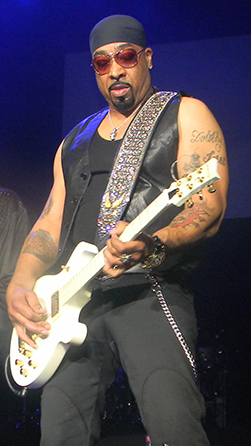
- Tommy Organ in 2013

Background information
- Also known as: Tommy "O"
- Born: Thomas LeRoy Organ Jr; 22 February 1963 (age 63)
- Origin: Cleveland, Ohio, U.S.
- Genres: Rock; pop rock; alternative rock; pop; R&B; funk metal; neo soul
- Occupations: Musician; songwriter; record producer
- Instruments: Guitar; bass guitar; drums; keyboards; vocals
- Years active: 1981–present
- Labels: Epic; RCA; Bentley
- Member of: The Pussycat Dolls
- Formerly of: Michael Jackson; Janet Jackson; The Jacksons; Usher; Toni Braxton; TLC; New Edition; Anastacia; Jimmy Jam and Terry Lewis; Aaron Carter; Ray Charles; Lionel Richie; Melissa Manchester; Eddie Murphy
- Website: tommyoorgan.com

Thomas LeRoy Organ, Jr. (born 22 February 1963) is an American musician, songwriter, and record producer.

The son of Thomas LeRoy Organ, Sr. (1940 – 1966 Musician, Army Veteran) and Dorothy Louise Render-Organ (1941 Legal Secretary, Entrepreneur), he began playing music at a very young age. His brother, Derek LaMont Organ (1961 Musician) is a prolific session drummer.

He has toured with such important artists as, Janet Jackson, Usher, Toni Braxton, TLC and The Jacksons. He also completed studio recordings with Ray Charles, Lionel Richie, Jimmy Jam and Terry Lewis. Tommy has also played in ceremonies of The Grammys, American Music Awards and MTV Music Awards with various artists.
In 2009, Tommy was chosen as a guitarist in Michael Jackson's "This is it" Tour band. After the death of Michael Jackson later that year, Tommy participated in Michael Jackson Tribute shows and as lead guitarist in The Jacksons’ "Unity Tour" in 2012 and 2013.

== Life and career ==
=== Early years ===
Picking up the guitar at three years old, Tommy began playing music he heard on the radio by age five. He became a professional musician during high school joining the R&B group, Fantasy. In 1977 at the age of 14, he joined the band 7th Heaven as lead guitar, with Cornelius Mims on bass guitar, Rex Salas on keyboards, his brother Derek Organ on drums, Josef Parson as rhythm guitar, John Bolden on saxophone, Andy Cleves on trumpet and Kipper Jones as lead vocalist. In 1979, 7th Heaven changed the name to Tease. By the mid-1980s, some new members had joined the band, like Chuckii Booker on keyboards and Jay Shanklin on bass guitar.
Tease was founded in California as an R&B/Funk group, performing locally and nationally in the United States such as US Naval bases and top clubs in Los Angeles like "The Roxy" and "Trubador" getting a record deal with RCA Records in 1983, for the recording of their first album, the self-titled Tease. In 1986, the band joined Epic Records, where they recorded two more albums: Tease (second self-titled) in 1986 and Remember in 1988.

=== Musical Career and Collaborations ===
In February 1990, with Tease having broken up, Tommy Organ started touring with Janet Jackson on her Rhythm Nation World Tour as guitarist and keyboardist until the end of the tour in November of the same year; for this work, he was awarded a platinum album plaque commemorating 6 million records sold. He subsequently toured with international artists such as Usher, Toni Braxton, TLC, New Edition, The Jacksons, Anastacia, Ne-Yo, James Ingram, Natalie Cole, Maxwell, Aaron Carter and many more.
Mr. Organ has also completed studio recordings with Ray Charles, Lionel Richie, Melissa Manchester, Brandy, Jimmy Jam and Terry Lewis, Rodney Jerkins, Randy Jackson, Gladys Knight, Mary J. Blige, Beyoncé and Snoop Dogg.
Besides performing, Tommy Organ writes and produces music for other artists such as writing the song "Danger Zone" on Waymon Tisdale's "Power Forward" CD. In addition to being a member of the After Dark with Michael Baisden house band, Tommy has also appeared on the Arsenio Hall Show, Late Night with David Letterman and The Tonight Show with Jay Leno, The Grammys, American Music Awards, MTV Music Awards, The Soul Train Music Awards and Soul Train with various artists.
In spring of 2009, Tommy was chosen as a guitarist in Michael Jackson's "This is it" Concert Tour band. When Jackson unexpectedly died later that year, Tommy was credited as himself in the film chronicling concert rehearsal footage entitled Michael Jackson's "This is it". Tommy had this to say about Jackson's death,"I didn’t believe it," says Organ. "I kept saying, 'The media is just picking at him again.’ I kept getting phone calls, and I was saying, 'Let me go down to rehearsal because no one’s called me to say it’s cancelled.’ Then I walked into the Staples Centre, my amp was off, and the lights were half-way turned down on stage, and I knew… The day before he was on stage, dancing and singing. Next day, he was gone.". "He would just fill the room up, man, with joy"
Tommy participated in Michael Jackson Tribute shows all over the world, in addition to performing as lead guitarist in The Jacksons’ "Unity Tour" from 2012 to 2013.
Later in 2009 Tommy Organ collaborated as lead guitarist in the George Lopez Tonight late night television show house band, The Ese Vatos, (headed by "This Is It" musical director Michael Bearden) for two years.
In 2016 Tommy began recording and editing his debut solo music compilation "Tommy O" which was released at the end of 2016 by "Bentley Records". The first single of this album is called "I Want You" and was released on August 26, 2016.

Currently, Tommy is writing, producing and recording music with an array of musical artists on his own record label, Artistic Records, a subsidiary of the parent company, Artistic Sources, LLC. Tommy devotes hours for a charity organization close to his heart: Artistic Resources founded by Tommy and his wife, Laura. He can also be seen on tour with The Jacksons and Michael in concerts worldwide.

== Discography ==
=== Studio albums ===
Year	Album
1983	Tease (with Tease)
1986	Tease (with Tease)
1988	Remember (with Tease)

=== https://artisticsources.comReleased Singles as Solo artist ===
Year	Title
2016	"I want you"

=== Studio collaborations ===
Year	Album	Tommy "O" Credit	Artist
1983	"Visions"	Guitar	Gladys Knight & the Pips
1988	"The Right Stuff"	Guitar	Vanessa Williams
1990	"Ordinary Story"	Guitar	Kipper Jones
1992	"Niice 'n Wiild"	Guitar	Chuckii Booker
1992	"Brother With Two Tongues"	Guitar	Mellow Man Ace
1992	"In the Storm"	Guitar	El DeBarge
1993	"When summer comes"	Guitar	George Howard
1993	"My world"	Guitar	Ray Charles
1994	"Brandy"	Guitar	Brandy
1994	"Heart, Mind & Soul"	Guitar	El DeBarge
1994	"Confesion De Amigos"	Guitar	Pastor De Los Santos
1995	"In the House"	Arranger, Guitar	The 5th Dimension
1995	"Power Forward"	Guitar, Producer, Composer ("Danger zone")	Wayman Tisdale
1996	"Under the streetlights"	Guitar, Composer ("Tryin' to Get My Groove On")	Dazz Band
1996	"Connected to the Unexpected"	Electric Guitar	Misha
1997	"Songbook, Vol. 1: The Songs of Babyface"	Guitar	The Whispers
1997	"The Power of Touch"	Guitar	Bobby Lyle
1998	"There's a Riot Goin' On"	Guitar	George Howard
2001	"360 Urban Groove"	Guitar	Jimmy Sommers
2001	"Journey"	Guitar	Howard Hewett
2003	"Lovelife"	Guitar	Jimmy Sommers
2005	"20th Century Masters:Smooth Jazz -Christmas Collection"	Guitar	Various artists
2007	"Sunset Collective"	Guitar	Jimmy Sommers
2008	"My so fine"	Guitar	Andre Delano
2008	"Patti Austin"	Guitar	Patti Austin
2008	"Next Level"	Guitar, Steel guitar	Sekou Bunch
2008	"Howard Hewett Christmas"	Guitar	Howard Hewett
2009	"Smoove on the Move"	Guitar	JDee
2009	"The Good Life Movement"	Electric Guitar	Bosko
2009	"Star Power"	Guitar	Norman Connors
2009	"Unwrapped, Vol. 6: Give the Drummer Some!"	Guitar	Unwrapped
2009	"Stand Still"	Guitar	Alice Williams
2011	"It's Real"	Acoustic guitar	The Real Seduction
2011	"Radio Wayne"	Guitar	Wayne Brady
2013	"Alexander O'Neal"	Guitar	Alexander O'Neal
2014	"Change is Gonna Come"	Guitar	Steve Cooke

=== Music videos ===
Year	Song	Artist	Director
1990	"Black Cat"	Janet Jackson	Wayne Isham
1995	"Diggin' on you"	TLC	F. Gary Gray

== Filmography ==
Film
Year	Film	Role
1987	Zombie High	Himself (as member of "Tease")
2009	Michael Jackson's This Is It	Himself (as Michael Jackson's guitarist)

== Equipment ==
=== Guitars ===
- Musicman Reflex
- Musicman John Petrucci
- Musicman Silhouette
- Musicman Luke
- Tregan Guitars by Tommy Organ
- Minirak
- Akai 1997
- Fender Telecaster
- Kent
- Jimmy West strings, straps, picks and attire

=== Pedals ===
- "Whirlwind Rochester Series"
