= In the Storm =

- Original album artwork by Mark Ryden

Studio album by El DeBarge
- Released: March 17, 1992
- Recorded: 1991–92; Studio 89; North Hollywood, California; Ignited Studios; Hollywood, California; Fast Track Studios; Grand Rapids, Michigan
- Genre: R&B, soul
- Length: 72:12
- Label: Warner Bros. Records
- Producer: El DeBarge, Maurice White, Keith Crouch

El DeBarge chronology
Gemini (1989)	In the Storm (1992)	Heart, Mind and Soul (1994)

Singles from In the Storm
- 1. "After The Dance" Released: 1991; 2. "My Heart Belongs To You" Released: 1992; 3. "You Know What I Like" Released: 1992; 4. "Another Chance" Released: 1992 (PROMO)

In the Storm is the third studio album by El DeBarge released in 1992 by Warner Bros. Records. The album reached No. 22 on the Blues & Soul Top UK Soul Albums chart.

== Background ==
In the Storm was produced by both DeBarge and Maurice White. Artists such as Prince, Patti LaBelle, Chante Moore and Kool Moe Dee appeared on the album.

== Critical reception ==
Professional ratings
Review scores
Source	Rating
Allmusic	3/5 stars
People	(favourable)
Boston Globe	(favourable)
Indianapolis Star	3/4 stars
Rolling Stone	(favourable)
Vox	(7/10)
Dayton Daily News	4/4 stars
Fresno Bee	3.5/5 stars

Geoff Brown of Vox gave a 7 out of 10 rating and declared "Still, it's the best album I've heard by a DeBarge". Ken Capobianco of The Boston Globe noted that "El DeBarge's third solo flight adds a heavier funk accent to his usual R&B. He co-produced it with Maurice White and they've come up with a punchy mix of bass heavy jams and seductive ballads. Greg Simms of the Dayton Daily News gave a four out of five stars rating and exclaimed "On an album produced by El DeBarge and Maurice White, the former has teamed up with a group of splendid musicians to create an absolute masterpiece." Simms added "This album is about as good as pop music gets." People wrote "DeBarge’s first album in three years is something of a milestone. As he turns 30 and finally sheds his cutie-pie teen idol image, the singer joins a new label in a new funkier style." With a 3.5 out of 5 stars rating Don Mayhew of the Fresno Bee found that "This seems awfully derivative upon first listen, but further exploration reveals an intricate 19-track synthesis of old-school horns and guitars woven together with new jack swing percussion and sound bites". Craig Lytle of AllMusic stated "Aside from the Marvin Gaye undertones, this collection of songs is well written and produced. It is free of the typical and predictable rhythms of the day." Chuck Eddy of Rolling Stone proclaimed "El's In the Storm defies all expectations". He also added "It's a song cycle. And like most such animals, especially ones that rely on studio clutter, the music comes off a bit disjointed at first. But before long you surrender to the sheer wash of sound--meshes of high-pitched church voices; audacious "interludes" of electric wah-wah funk, piano-boogie jazz and liquid salsa; extravagant strings dousing sax solos." Lynn Dean Ford of the Indianapolis Star said "Still this disc, co-produced by Earth, Wind & Fire's Maurice White, comes highly recommended as a decent slice of retro funk and soul with some poignant social messages".

== Singles ==
A cover of Marvin Gaye's "After The Dance" with Fourplay peaked at number 2 on the Billboard Hot R&B Singles chart. "You Know What I Like" reached number 14 on the same chart.

== Track listing ==
- All songs written by El DeBarge, except as noted.
1. "Elmo Funk" (Prelude) - 0:54
2. "Fast Lane (featuring Kool Moe Dee)" (El DeBarge, Mohandas Dewese) - 5:05
3. "After the Dance (vocal)" (With Fourplay) (Marvin Gaye) - 6:02
4. "My Heart Belongs to You" (Keith Crouch) - 5:08
5. "Cry" (Interlude) - 0:21
6. "Love Me Tonight" - 6:15
7. "Sincerely Yours" (Interlude) - 0:58
8. "You Know What I Like" - 4:57
9. "Tip O' My Tongue" (Kirk Johnson, Paisley Park) - 5:07
10. "Soul Searchin'" (Prelude) - 0:22
11. "In The Storm" - 5:57
12. "And Then I Wrote" (Prelude) - 0:25
13. "Thick" - 4:45
14. "Another Chance" - 7:51
15. "Leggs" - 4:24
16. "Elmo Funk" (Interlude) - 2:30
17. "You Turn Me On" - 4:23
18. "Prelude to Midnight" - 1:55
19. "Special" (El DeBarge, Maurice White) - 5:09

== Personnel ==
- El DeBarge – lead vocals, backing vocals, keyboards, acoustic piano, clavinet, synth bass, percussion
- Keith Crouch – keyboards, synthesizers, clavinet, drum programming, percussion
- Kenneth Crouch – keyboards, drum programming
- Bob James – keyboards (3)
- Harvey Mason, Jr. – synthesizer and computer programming (3)
- Jonathan DuBose – guitar
- Johnny Graham – guitar
- Al McKay – guitar
- Tommy Organ – guitar
- Lee Ritenour – guitar (3)
- Larry Graham – bass
- Joel Smith – bass
- Nathan East – bass (3), backing vocals (3)
- Jimmy Abney – drums, percussion
- Harvey Mason – drums (3)
- Andrew Brown – additional percussion
- Don Myrick – saxophone
- Gary Bias – saxophone
- Reggie Young – trombone
- Raymond Lee Brown – trumpet
- Bill Meyers – horn and string arrangements
- Maurice White – backing vocals
- Kool Moe Dee – guest rap (2)
- Rodney Trotter – backing vocals
- Lester Wilson – backing vocals
- Barbara Wilson – backing vocals
- Brenda Wilson – backing vocals
- Patti LaBelle – backing vocals (3), BGV arrangements (3)
- Darryl DeBarge – backing vocals (3)
- James DeBarge – backing vocals
- The Juice Crew – backing vocals
- Chanté Moore – backing vocals
- Andrew Brown – backing vocals
- Rose Stone – backing vocals
- Olivia McKurken – backing vocals
- Maxine Anderson – backing vocals
- Val Young – backing vocals
- Rene Small – backing vocals
- Kevin Dorsey – backing vocals

== Production ==
- El DeBarge – producer (1, 2, 5–19), executive producer
- Maurice White – producer (1, 2, 5–19)
- Rodney Trotter – associate producer (2, 15)
- Fourplay – producers (3)
- Keith Crouch – producer (4)
- Benny Medina – executive producer
- Fred Moultrie – executive producer
- Galen L. Senogles – recording engineer
- Paul Klingberg – recording engineer, mixing
- Eddy Schreyer – mastering

== Charts ==
Chart (1992)	Peak position
UK Blues & Soul Top UK Soul Albums	22
