= Keith Crouch =

American songwriter and music producer

- Born: Keith Edward Crouch
- Origin: Pacoima, California, US
- Genres: Soul, R&B, gospel
- Occupations: Songwriter, music producer
- Instruments: keyboards, Fender Rhodes, synthesizers, clavinet
- Years active: 1990–present

Keith Edward Crouch is an American songwriter and music producer. The nephew of gospel singers Sandra and Andrae Crouch, Crouch began his career as a songwriter at the age of fifteen and landed his first gig at seventeen. From 1993 to 1994, he produced six songs for Brandy's self-titled debut album, three of which became top ten hits. He has produced for artists such as Toni Braxton, Mary J. Blige, Boyz II Men, Chaka Khan and Misia.

Crouch won two GMA Dove Awards in 2000 for Contemporary Gospel trio Anointed's self-titled album.

== Select songwriting and production discography ==
Year	Artist	Album	Song
1990	Kipper Jones	Ordinary Story	"Watch Over Me"
1992	El DeBarge	In the Storm	"My Heart Belongs to You"
1993	Caron Wheeler	Beach of the War Goddess	"Soul Street"
1993	Caron Wheeler	Beach of the War Goddess	"Do You Care"
1993	Nona Gaye	Love for the Future	"Don't Wait"
1993	Nona Gaye	Love for the Future	"Love for the Future"
1993	Nona Gaye	Love for the Future	"When You Were Mine"
1994	Boyz II Men	Inner City Blues: The Music of Marvin Gaye	"Let's Get It On" (Remix)
1994	Brandy	Brandy	"Baby"
1994	Brandy	Brandy	"Best Friend"
1994	Brandy	Brandy	"Brokenhearted"
1994	Brandy	Brandy	"I Wanna Be Down"
1994	Brandy	Brandy	Always On My Mind
1994	Lalah Hathaway	A Moment	"Separate Ways"
1994	Lalah Hathaway	A Moment	"Lean On Me"
1994	Lalah Hathaway	A Moment	"These Are The Things You Do To Me"
1994	Lalah Hathaway	A Moment	"Rise"
1995	Deborah Cox	Deborah Cox	"Sound of My Tears"
1995	Jason Weaver	Love Ambition	"I Can't Stand the Pain"
1995	Jason Weaver	Love Ambition	"Love Ambition (Call on Me)"
1995	Jason Weaver	Love Ambition	"So in Love"
1995	The Winans	Heart & Soul	"Count It All Joy"
1995	The Winans	Heart & Soul	"The Question Is"
1996	Chaka Khan	Epiphany: The Best of Chaka Khan, Vol. 1	"Somethin' Deep"
1996	Kenny Lattimore	Kenny Lattimore	"Just What It Takes"
1996	Tevin Campbell	Back to the World	"Dry Your Eyes"
1996	Tevin Campbell	Back to the World	"Beautiful Thing"
1996	Tevin Campbell	Back to the World	"I Got It Bad"
1996	Toni Braxton	Secrets	"Talking in His Sleep"
1997	Boyz II Men	Evolution	"All Night Long"
1997	Boyz II Men	Evolution	"Baby C'mon"
1997	Rahsaan Patterson	Rahsaan Patterson	"Come Over"
1997	Rahsaan Patterson	Rahsaan Patterson	"So Fine"
1997	Rahsaan Patterson	Rahsaan Patterson	"Stop By"
1997	Ray J	Everything You Want	"Because of You"
1997	Ray J	Everything You Want	"Can't Run, Can't Hide"
1997	Ray J	Everything You Want	"Everything You Want"
1997	Ray J	Everything You Want	"Good Thangs"
1997	Ray J	Everything You Want	"Let It Go"
1997	Ray J	Everything You Want	"Let It Go (Part II)"
1997	Ray J	Everything You Want	"Rock With Me"
1997	Ray J	Everything You Want	"Thank You"
1997	Ray J	Everything You Want	"The Promise"
1998	CeCe Winans	Everlasting Love	"I Am"
1998	CeCe Winans	Everlasting Love	"Well Alright"
1998	Eric Clapton	Pilgrim	"Pilgrim" (Remix)
1998	Maxwell	Embrya	"Matrimony: Maybe You" (Remix)
1998	Tamia	Tamia	"Gotta Move On"
1999	Anointed	Anointed	"Anything Is Possible"
1999	Anointed	Anointed	"Head Above Water Anointed"
1999	Anointed	Anointed	"Ooh Baby"
2000	Toni Braxton	The Heat	"Maybe"
2001	Cherokee	Soul Parade	"I Swear"
2002	Brandy	Full Moon	"Apart"
2002	Mary J. Blige	Deliver Us from Eva Soundtrack	"Star for Life"
2004	Misia	Mars & Roses	"Challenger"
2004	Misia	Mars & Roses	"In My Soul"
2004	Misia	Mars & Roses	"Snow Song"
2004	Misia	Mars & Roses	"Sunshine"
2005	Esthero	Wikked Lil' Grrrls	"Gone (featuring Cee-Lo Green)"
2008	Eric Benét	Love & Life	"Chocolate Legs"
2011	Rahsaan Patterson	Bleuphoria	
