= Tease (band) =

American R&B band

- Origin: Los Angeles, California, U.S.
- Genres: Funk; R&B; new jack swing
- Years active: 1979–1988
- Labels: RCA; Epic
- Past members: Kipper Jones; Josef Parson; Thomas Organ; Rex Salas; Derek Organ; Cornelius Mims; Jay Shanklin; Chuckii Booker

Tease was an American R&B band formed in Los Angeles, California in 1979. The band originally consisted of Kipper Jones (lead vocalist); Josef Parson (rhythm guitarist); Thomas Organ (lead guitarist); Thomas' brother, Derek Organ (drummer); Rex Salas (keyboardist); and Cornelius Mims (bassist).

== Career ==
Forming in California in 1977 and first performing under the name 7th Heaven, the group changed their name to Tease in 1979. By late 1982, they had scored a record deal with RCA Records, at the recommendation of prolific session drummer, Ollie E. Brown, who produced the group's self-titled debut album, released the following year. The album featured a pair of singles, "Flash" and "What Should I Do," but neither of them found chart success.

The band's lineup underwent several changes in 1986, with the exit of Parson, Mims, and eventually Salas. Jay Shanklin replaced Mims on bass, while Chuckii Booker, himself already an established session musician and songwriter/arranger, joined initially as an additional keyboardist, though he later inherited all keyboard duties upon Salas' departure. Salas would, however, return to the group in time for a 1987 tour.

In the meantime, signing a new deal with Epic Records, Tease released a second self-titled album in 1986. This album featured the hit single, "Firestarter", which peaked at no. 11 on June 21, 1986, staying on the chart for 11 weeks.

Two years later, the group released a third album, Remember. Although it featured a minor R&B hit with a cover of the Ann Peebles song "I Can't Stand the Rain," the album could not sustain the momentum generated by "Firestarter," and the group broke up later that year.

== Aftermath ==
Following the dissolution of the group, nearly all of the individual members (across all incarnations of the band) remained active in the music business, embarking on careers of their own and often collaborating with each other. Kipper Jones teamed with Rex Salas to co-write and produce Vanessa Williams' 1988 album The Right Stuff, including the hit title track. Mims, Booker, and both Organ brothers also participated in the project, performing on select tracks from the album.

After releasing a solo album, Ordinary Story, in 1990, Kipper Jones continued as a producer and songwriter, contributing heavily to Vanessa Williams' 1992 follow-up album, The Comfort Zone and co-writing several hit songs from the debut album by Brandy. Mims became an in-demand session bassist and producer in his own right, working with Gladys Knight, Mary J. Blige, and LL Cool J, among others. Salas himself maintained his profile as a producer and session musician, later touring as live keyboardist for the likes of Robert Palmer and TLC. Eventually drifting into the world of music direction and arrangement, Salas has received multiple Grammy and Emmy Award nominations. Tommy Organ became a prolific session guitarist, performing on hit records for such artists as TLC, Michael Jackson, and Janet Jackson, with many of these recordings also including brother Derek Organ, who immersed himself in session work as well.

Chuckii Booker released a self-titled solo album (Chuckii) in 1989, scoring several major R&B hits, including the number one "Turned Away". Despite releasing a successful follow-up and its final studio album, Niice 'n Wiild three years later (spearheaded by another number one R&B hit, "Games"), Booker gained more prominence as a producer, songwriter, arranger, and session multi-instrumentalist for other artists as the decade progressed, shaping albums by Troop, Kool & the Gang, his godfather Barry White, Calloway, The Whispers, Vanessa Williams, and others. Many of his sessions have included his former Tease bandmate Tommy Organ on guitar, with brother Derek sometimes contributing on drums as well. Like Salas, he later expanded his palate to encompass the roles of musical director and touring musician, serving as longtime music director for Lionel Richie's tours, among other gigs.

In February 2020, bassist Jay Shanklin died at the age of 55.

== Discography ==
=== Studio albums ===
- Tease (1983, RCA Records)
- Tease (1986, Epic Records)
- Remember (1988, Epic Records)

=== Singles ===
Year	Song	US R&B
1983	"Flash"	—
1983	"What Should I Do"	—
1986	"Better Wild (Than Mild)"	81
1986	"Firestarter"	11
1986	"Kick"	—
1986	"I Wish You Were Here"	87
1988	"Somewhere, Somebody"	—
1988	"I Can't Stand the Rain"	34
"—" denotes releases that did not chart.
