= Best Friend (Brandy song) =

1995 single by Brandy

Single by Brandy

from the album Brandy
- Released: April 11, 1995
- Recorded: 1994
- Studio: Human Rhythm (Los Angeles)
- Genre: R&B; pop
- Length: 4:48 (album version); 4:32 (radio edit)
- Label: Atlantic
- Songwriters: Keith Crouch; Glenn McKinney
- Producer: Keith Crouch

Brandy singles chronology
"Baby" (1994)	"Best Friend" (1995)	"Brokenhearted" (1995)

Music video
- "Best Friend" on YouTube

"Best Friend" is a song by American singer Brandy. It was written by Keith Crouch and Glenn McKinney for her self-titled debut album (1994), while production was helmed by the former. The song was dedicated to her brother Ray J.

The song was released as the album's third single in June 1995. It peaked at number 11 in New Zealand, number 34 on the US Billboard Hot 100, and number seven on the Billboard Hot R&B Singles chart. The song was also included in her sitcom, Moesha, where Kim and she (Countess Vaughn) were cheerleaders in the final scene of the second episode "Friends" that aired in early 1996. Brandy performed the song on Soul Train (June 1995) and Showtime at the Apollo (October 1995).

== Background ==
"Best Friend" was written by Keith Crouch and Glenn McKinney, while production was helmed by Crouch. A lighthearted "jeep pop" ode to sibling bonds, Norwood dedicated the song to her younger brother Ray J who was initially supposed to appear on a duet version of the song. Crouch used an E-mu SP-1200 to sample the kick drums and snare drums on "Best Friend", and had Rashaan Patterson sing a scratch demo to the lead of the track. He also convinced his friend, saxophonist Derrick Edmondson, to play the flute on the song, though Edmondson initially disliked the raspy tone of his flute sounds which came from his deep, raspy voice. With Crouch being the last producer on Brandy to join the team, his songs were the last to be recorded.

Norwood created the backgrounds vocals on "Best Friend" by herself. Coming from a church where she grew up singing a capella, she loved "playing with different notes and feeling that union with different harmonies and sounds [..] And this song was the first time I'd felt that feeling outside of the church." In a 2019 interview with Billboard, she disclosed that she had initially favored "Best Friend" to be the lead single due to its personal lyrics and that she "had to be convinced that ["I Wanna Be Down"] was the right first single, because [she] loved "Best Friend" so much." She further told Complex: "I actually think that was the song that should’ve been the first single, because it was about my brother Ray J [...] It was great to do a song about him, because he means everything to me. It was just about our relationship. We were not going through anything at the time. I just wanted to dedicate a song to him that meant something to me."

== Critical reception ==
In his review for Billboard magazine, Larry Flick wrote: "Brandy's cachet as one of the freshest young talents to emerge in recent memory continues to increase. This third single from sterling eponymous collection follows the jeep-pop vibe of 'I Wanna Be Down' and 'Baby', while also going for a slightly harder-edged groove in rambunctious remixed by Troy Taylor and Charles Farrar. At all times, Brandy's sweet and girlishly soulful delivery is center stage – as is the song's wickedly infectious hook. Another out-of-the-box smash." In a retrospective review, Flick's Billboard colleague Clover Hope wrote that "Brandy's relationship with her younger brother Ray J is well known. This lighthearted track [...] served as a super lovable ode to sibling bonds. Don't mind that it's heavy on cheese ('Friends are there through thick and thin')."

Oprah Daily's Grant Rindnerfelt that the song was "sweet and consistently surprising, with blips of flute and eccentric percussion spicing up this tender family tribute. Brandy's delivery stands out, too, as she descends to the lowest point in her vocal range, creating a husky rasp." Natalie Maher from Harpers Bazaar called "Best Friend" a "standout from [Brandy's] nascent catalogue, as she floats over the airy instrumental, declaring: 'You've always been here right beside me / So I call you my best friend.'" In a review of parent album Brandy, Complex found that "even when things become a bit doe-eyed, as they do on [...] 'Best Friend,' the album’s mix of sharp soul and hip-hop production keeps heads bopping and things from teetering into corniness."

== Music video ==
An accompanying music video for "Best Friend" was directed by Matthew Rolston and filmed in 1995. The partially black and white, partially colored video features Norwood and her backup troupe displaying their hip hop dancing skills in front of a garage. Ray J appears as himself in the video, playing a larger role during the first half of the clip when Norwood tries to keep him away from an older woman he is dancing with on the dance floor. On his appearance, Norwood commented: "It was so much fun just working with him, because it never feels like work when we work together. We were just young and we had so much fun doing that."

== Track listings ==
All tracks written by Keith Crouch and Glenn McKinney.

CD single
No.	Title	Producer(s)	Length
1.	"Best Friend" (Radio Edit)	Crouch	4:17
2.	"Best Friend" (Character R&B Mix featuring Channel Live)	Charles Farrar; Troy Taylor	5:33
3.	"Best Friend" (Rocappella Beat Box)	Crouch; Bread & Butter^{[a]}	4:54
4.	"Best Friend" (Midday Club Mix)	Farrar; Taylor; A Guy Named Fred	7:24

Notes

- ^{^a} denotes additional producer

== Personnel ==
Personnel are adapted from the liner notes of Brandy.

- Keith Crouch – producer, recording, writer
- Derrick Edmondson – flute, saxophone
- Sherree Ford-Payne – backing vocals
- Brian Gardner – mastering
- Booker T. Jones – mixing
- Glenn McKinney – guitar, writer
- Brandy Norwood – backing vocals, lead vocals

== Charts ==
=== Weekly charts ===
Chart (1995)	Peak position
New Zealand (Recorded Music NZ)	11
US Billboard Hot 100	34
US Dance Singles Sales (Billboard)	4
US Hot R&B/Hip-Hop Songs (Billboard)	7
US Rhythmic Airplay (Billboard)	17
US Cash Box Top 100	28

=== Year-end charts ===
Chart (1995)	Position
US Billboard Hot 100	98
US Hot R&B Singles (Billboard)	37

== Release history ==
Release dates and format(s) for "Best Friend"
Region	Date	Format(s)	Label(s)	Ref.
United States	April 11, 1995	Rhythmic contemporary radio	Atlantic	
United States	May 9, 1995	Contemporary hit radio	Atlantic	
Australia	August 28, 1995	CD; cassette	Atlantic	
