= You Know What I Like =

Single by El DeBarge

from the album In the Storm
- Released: 1992
- Genre: Pop; R&B
- Label: Warner Bros.
- Songwriter: El DeBarge
- Producer: Maurice White

El DeBarge singles chronology
"Real Love" (1989)	"You Know What I Like" (1992)	"My Heart Belongs to You" (1992)

"You Know What I Like" is a song by R&B singer El DeBarge featuring Chanté Moore issued as a single in 1992 on Warner Bros. Records. The single peaked at No. 14 on the Billboard Hot R&B Singles chart.

== Overview ==
"You Know What I Like" was composed by El DeBarge and produced by Maurice White. Singer Chanté Moore also made her debut as a recording artist on the song.

== Samples ==
"You Know What I Like" was sampled by hip hop artist Warren G on the track "Keepin' It Strong" off his 2001 album The Return of the Regulator.

== Performances ==
El DeBarge and Chante Moore performed "You Know What I Like" on an episode of Soul Train.
