= I Wanna Be Down =

1994 single by Brandy

Single by Brandy

from the album Brandy
- Released: August 11, 1994
- Recorded: 1994
- Studio: Human Rhythm (Los Angeles)
- Genre: R&B; hip-hop soul
- Length: 4:51
- Label: Atlantic
- Songwriters: Keith Crouch; Kipper Jones
- Producer: Keith Crouch

Brandy singles chronology
"I Wanna Be Down" (1994)	"Baby" (1994)

Music videos
- "I Wanna Be Down" on YouTube; "I Wanna Be Down" (remix) on YouTube

"I Wanna Be Down" is a song by American recording artist Brandy from her self-titled debut album (1994). It was written by musicians Keith Crouch and Kipper Jones, with production helmed by the former, it was released as Brandy's debut single on August 11, 1994. The song is a mid-tempo track that features a thunderous beat and light synth riffs. Lyrically, "I Wanna Be Down" describes a flirt with a boy, who Norwood tries to convince of her loveliness.

The song's music video was filmed by Keith Ward and released in October 1994. It features Norwood in her tomboyish image, dancing in front of a jeep near a forest, surrounded by backup dancers. "I Wanna Be Down" was performed on several television and award show ceremonies, such as The Tonight Show with Jay Leno, the 1996 Soul Train Music Awards, and the 2014 BET Hip Hop Awards. It has been performed on almost every one of Norwood's concerts and tours, and is featured on the compilation album The Best of Brandy (2005).

"I Wanna Be Down" was released to positive reaction by contemporary music critics. Its impact on the charts was comparatively large for a debut single: While it spent four weeks on top of the US Billboard Hot R&B Singles chart, it reached number six on the Billboard Hot 100, and the top 20 in Australia and New Zealand. In 1995, a hip hop remix with new lyrics from female rappers MC Lyte, Queen Latifah, and Yo-Yo was released.

== Background ==
In 1993, after years of trying to land a deal with a major label, 14-year-old Brandy signed a contract with Atlantic Records and began work on her debut album. Darryl Williams, the label's director of A&R, initially consulted Curtis "Sauce" Wilson, Rochad "Cat Daddy" Holiday, and Jeff "Fuzzy" Young from all-male R&B group Somethin' for the People and musician Damon Thomas to work with her on material. About a year into the recording process, Williams introduced the relatively unknown writer-producer Keith Crouch, a nephew of gospel singer Andrae Crouch, to collaborate with her. Williams and Crouch had met after Crouch had completed a four-year stint as a songwriter with Michael Jackson's publishing company, during which he worked with artists such as Tony, Toni, Tone, El Debarge, Caron Wheeler, and Nona Gaye.

== Recording ==
"I Wanna Be Down" was written by Crouch and former Tease singer Kipper Jones, while production and arrangement was also handled by the former for Human Rhythm Productions. The last producer to join the project, Crouch conceived the song while informally jamming with his brother Kenneth Crouch at his apartment, reportedly drafting its core in under ten minutes. He later played a rough demo for Jones and invited him to contribute lyrics. Jones developed the song's hook while writing in his car, with the verses subsequently completed at Crouch's home.

Jones initially envisioned Vanessa Williams recording the track, having previously written the title hit songs for her first two albums, The Right Stuff (1988) and The Comfort Zone (1991). However, Darryl Williams and Atlantic head Sylvia Rhone instead encouraged the pair to record the song with Brandy, commissioning additional material from them for her debut album. Though initially hesitant to give what he considered a "special" song to an unknown 15-year-old artist, Jones reconsidered after hearing Brandy's vocal performance, which impressed him. Recording and vocal production for "I Wanna Be Down" were completed over two days. Crouch used a Roland MKS-20 during production, working within a budget of $17,500. Darryl Simmons was credited as executive producer on "I Wanna Be Down", while mastering was overseen by Brian Gardner.

== Composition and lyrics ==
Brandy – "I Wanna Be Down"
A 24-second audio sample of the song, sees Brandy singing accompanied by mid–tempo track that features a thunderous beat and light synth riffs.

"I Wanna Be Down" is a contemporary R&B production that lasts for four minutes and fifty-one seconds (4:51). The mid-tempo song contains keyboards and drums and is influenced by the music genre hip hop soul. It was written, produced and arranged by Keith Crouch and Kipper Jones at Human Rhythm Studios. The background song was performed by Norwood and Tiara Le Macks. Booker T. Jones was responsible for the sound mix. The lyrics are about a young woman's love for a man. In the chorus, Brandy sings: "I wanna be down with what you're going through / I wanna be down / I wanna be down with you". The song is composed in the key of B minor in a common time, and features a tempo of 86 beats per minute.

== Release ==
"I Wanna Be Down" was released in the United States on August 11, 1994, by Atlantic Records. The most common CD maxi single release included the album version, an extended mix called "Cool Out" and an a cappella version. On the cover, Brandy is seen sitting in an overall in front of a blue gate. The photo was taken by photographer Michael Miller. who has previously worked with artists such as Cypress Hill and Daddy Freddy. In the UK, the single was released by East West Records on December 5, 1994.

Chosen by Atlantic Records as the lead single from her debut album, Norwood initially did not like the idea of releasing it as her first offering. "'I Wanna Be Down' was interesting," she said in a retrospective interview with Complex magazine in 2012. "I didn't really get it at first, but I was young and I didn't really know what worked at radio or what it was. I liked the song, but I just didn't get it being the first thing that people heard from me." Upon its chart success, she changed her mind on their decision however: "[...] Once it was released and I saw why everyone responded to the title phrase, I understood why!"

== Critical reception ==
Steve Baltin from Cash Box concluded that "I Wanna Be Down" "has the teen-aged Brandy poised to be the next big thing in the R&B market." He explained further, "By mixing a traditional r&b style with a hip-hop groove, Brandy has created a song with across-the-board appeal that will continue to rise on the pop charts." Pan-European magazine Music & Media wrote, "One Bourbon, one Scotch, one beer; in the world of music, that used to be the order booze poured in, until this teenage girl entered the swingbeat ring. Slowly you'll be punch drunk." Alan Jones from Music Week deemed the song as "a slow, sinewy number in the TLC mould". Ralp Tee from the magazine's RM Dance Update wrote, "Just 16 years old, Brandy ventures into the same musical territory as fellow teenager Aaliyah. Simply exploding on import over last weekend, the track is essentially a catchy two-stepper with the arrangement kept to a basic drum and bass pattern, interspersed with subtle keyboard and synth guitar. An impressive debut." Another editor, James Hamilton, described it as a "slinky girls' superb smoochy Isleys-ish guitar backed 86bpm US smash".

== Music video ==
The original music video for "I Wanna Be Down" was directed by Keith Ward. The video portrays Norwood in her tomboyish image, dancing in front of a Hummer near a forest, surrounded by backup dancers. Her first video shooting, Norwood explained the filming a great experience: "I was so excited about the video. I got a chance to work with some great people like Frank Gatson. All my friends were in the video. My brother was in the video [...] He was there and we had this little dance, and that became really popular. That was a fun time. I was so excited because my dream was coming through right before my eyes... at the age of 15".

== Hip-hop remix ==
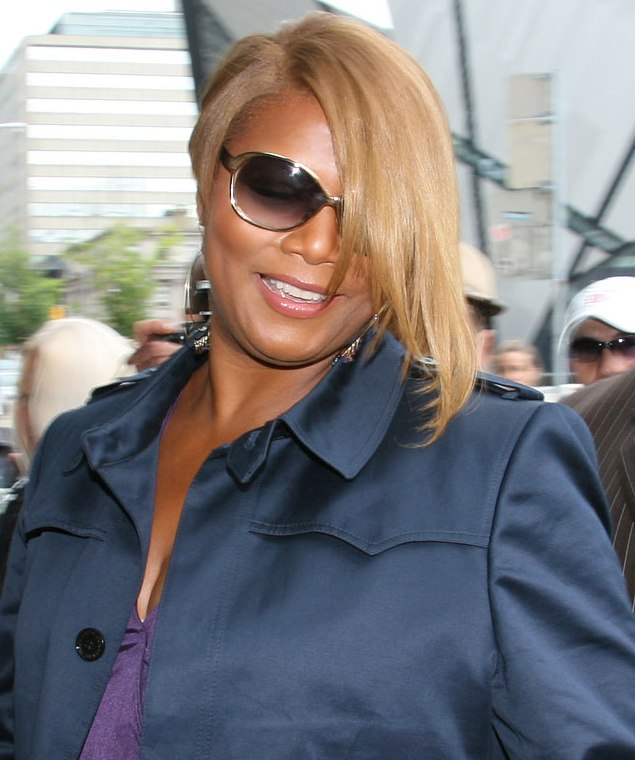
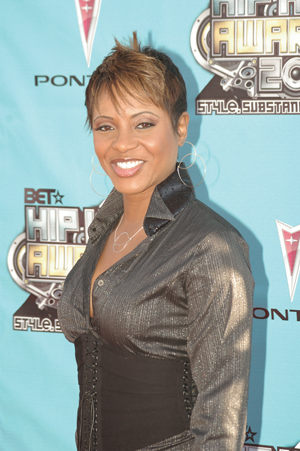
Rappers Queen Latifah (left) and MC Lyte along with Yo-Yo appeared on the official Human Rhythm Hip Hop Remix of "I Wanna Be Down".

Upon its release, Atlantic Records head Sylvia Rhone came up with the idea of re-recording the track with a group of rappers. "I Wanna Be Down" was eventually remixed with new lyrics from female rappers MC Lyte, Queen Latifah, and Yo-Yo. "The hip-hop remix meant the world to me," Norwood stated in 2012. "I'm fresh out of the box and these superstars are a part of my first single! They are my mentors and I looked up to them. I was a huge Queen Latifah fan. I'm thinking, 'Oh my God...I can't believe this is happening to me.' I got the chance to vibe with all three of them. They embraced me as a little sister. I was one of the first R&B artists to welcome hip-hop onto an R&B beat. It had never been done before quite like that[...] I knew it was a special record."

=== Music video ===
A music video for the Human Rhythm Hip Hop Remix premiered in February 1995. It was filmed by director Hype Williams whose remix video for Craig Mack's 1994 song "Flava in Ya Ear" served as inspiration for the video. A simple performance video, it features appearances by Lyte, Latifah, and Yo-Yo and was photographed "in glamorous black and white and vivacious color, complete with flashbulbs popping to the beat." Norwood's younger brother Ray J made a cameo appearance in the video. This version eventually earned Norwood her first nomination for a MTV Video Music Award for Best Rap Video at the 1995 ceremony.

== Track listings ==
All tracks written by Keith Crouch and Kipper Jones, and produced by the former.

US CD maxi single
No.	Title	Length
1.	"I Wanna Be Down" (LP version)	4:53
2.	"I Wanna Be Down" (instrumental)	4:09
3.	"I Wanna Be Down" (Cool Out)	5:13
4.	"I Wanna Be Down" (Cool Out instrumental)	5:13
5.	"I Wanna Be Down" (a capella)	4:32

European CD single
No.	Title	Length
1.	"I Wanna Be Down" (LP edit)	4:09
2.	"I Wanna Be Down" (Human Rhythm Hip Hop remix featuring MC Lyte, Queen Latifah & Yo-Yo)	4:15
3.	"I Wanna Be Down" (LP version)	4:53
4.	"I Wanna Be Down" (Cool Out)	5:13
5.	"I Wanna Be Down" (a capella)	4:32

European CD single
No.	Title	Length
1.	"I Wanna Be Down" (LP edit)	4:09
2.	"I Wanna Be Down" (LP version)	4:53
3.	"I Wanna Be Down" (Cool Out)	5:13
4.	"I Wanna Be Down" (a capella)	4:32

== Personnel ==
Personnel are adapted from the liner notes of Brandy.

- Kipper Jones – writer
- Tiara LeMack – backing vocals
- Brandy Norwood – backing vocals, lead vocals
- Keith Crouch – producer, recording, writer
- Booker T. Jones – mixing
- Brian Gardner – mastering

== Charts ==
=== Weekly charts ===
1994 weekly chart performance for "I Wanna Be Down"
Chart (1994)	Peak position
UK Singles (Official Charts)	44
UK Dance (Official Charts)	8
UK Hip Hop/R&B (Official Charts)	5
UK Club Chart (Music Week)	84
US Billboard Hot 100	6
US Dance Singles Sales (Billboard)	4
US Hot R&B/Hip-Hop Songs (Billboard)	1
US Rhythmic Airplay (Billboard)	3
US Cash Box Top 100	7

1995 weekly chart performance for "I Wanna Be Down"
Chart (1995)	Peak position
Australia (ARIA)	12
Europe (European Dance Radio)	17
Netherlands (Dutch Single Tip)	7
New Zealand (Recorded Music NZ)	11
UK Singles (Official Charts)	36
UK Dance (Official Charts)	15
UK Hip Hop/R&B (Official Charts)	5

=== Year-end charts ===
1994 year-end chart performance for "I Wanna Be Down"
Chart (1994)	Position
US Billboard Hot 100	100
US Hot R&B Singles (Billboard)	24
US Maxi-Singles Sales (Billboard)	44

1995 year-end chart performance for "I Wanna Be Down"
Chart (1995)	Position
Australia (ARIA)	89
US Billboard Hot 100	49
US Hot R&B Singles (Billboard)	22
US Cash Box Top 100	45

== Certifications ==
Certifications for "I Wanna Be Down"
Region	Certification	Certified units/sales
New Zealand (RMNZ)	Platinum	30,000^{‡}
United States (RIAA)	Platinum	1,000,000^{‡}
^{‡} Sales+streaming figures based on certification alone.

== Release history ==
Release dates and formats for "I Wanna Be Down"
Region	Date	Format(s)	Label(s)	Ref.
United States	August 11, 1994	Commercial	Atlantic	
United Kingdom	December 5, 1994	12-inch vinyl; CD; cassette	EastWest	
Australia	January 16, 1995	CD; cassette	Atlantic	
United Kingdom (re-release)	May 22, 1995	12-inch vinyl; CD; cassette	EastWest	

== See also ==
- R&B number-one hits of 1994 (USA)
