= Brandy (album) =

Studio album by Brandy
- Released: September 27, 1994
- Recorded: 1993–1994
- Studios: Ameraycan; EMI; Human Rhythm; Studio 56; Swing Bopulous (Los Angeles); Aire L.A. (Glendale)
- Genre: R&B
- Length: 55:31
- Label: Atlantic
- Producers: Keith Crouch; Kenneth Crouch; Arvel McClinton; Somethin' for the People; Damon Thomas

Brandy chronology
| Brandy (1994) | Never Say Never (1998) |

Singles from Brandy
- 1. "I Wanna Be Down" Released: August 11, 1994; 2. "Baby" Released: December 24, 1994; 3. "Best Friend" Released: April 11, 1995; 4. "Brokenhearted" Released: August 8, 1995

Brandy is the debut album by the American singer Brandy. It was released on September 27, 1994, by Atlantic Records. Chiefly produced by Keith Crouch, the album contains a range of contemporary genres, including hip-hop, pop-soul, and R&B. Aside from Crouch, Norwood worked with a range of other writers and producers, including R&B group Somethin' for the People, Arvel McClinton, Damon Thomas, and Crouch's brother Kenneth.

Upon release, Brandy received generally positive reviews from music critics, who complimented Norwood's appearance, as well as the album's timeless appeal. While the album initially sold slowly, it reached number 20 on the US Billboard 200 and was certified quadruple platinum by the Recording Industry Association of America (RIAA), selling over four million copies in the United States.

Four singles were released from the album. "I Wanna Be Down" was chosen as the album's lead single and peaked at number six on the US Billboard Hot 100. The song was critically lauded and was regarded as a standout track on Brandy. The album's second single "Baby" was also well-received and peaked at number four on the Billboard Hot 100. The following two singles, "Best Friend" and "Brokenhearted", peaked at numbers 34 and nine on the Billboard Hot 100, respectively. Brandy and its singles garnered Norwood nominations for various awards, including two Grammy Award nominations. The success of the album allowed Norwood to establish herself as one of the most successful of the then-new generation of R&B female vocalists who emerged during the mid-to-late 1990s.

== Background ==
Trained in church and influenced by Whitney Houston, Brandy's talent led in 1990 to a binding oral contract with Teaspoon Productions, headed by Chris Stokes and Earl Harris, who obtained her and her younger brother Ray J gigs as a backing vocalist for their R&B boy band Immature and undertook efforts to obtain a recording contract on her behalf. At age 11, she auditioned for Darryl Williams, director of A&R at Atlantic Records, as part of a girl group assembled by Stokes, but although Williams identified her as the standout, he deemed her too young and advised her to return at 14, prompting the group's dissolution and a renewed focus by Stokes on developing her as a solo artist. After unsuccessful auditions with several major labels, including Arista, Elektra, Epic, and Warner, Brandy's mother, Sonja, left her job to become her full-time manager. Although Teaspoon was close to securing her a record deal with East West Records, she acted on Williams's advice and arranged Brandy, then 14, a further audition with him and Sylvia Rhone, who ultimately offered her a recording contract on the spot.

Around the same time, Brandy secrured a supporting role in the ABC sitcom Thea, portraying the 15-year-old daughter of a single mother played by Thea Vidale. She subsequently withdrew from Hollywood High School, where staff had failed to send her out for auditions, and received private tutoring from tenth grade onward. The series ran for 19 episodes and was broadcast to mediocre ratings before being canceled after one season. Brandy later reflected positively on the cancellation, noting her complicated relationship with Vidale on set and her limited enthusiasm for acting at the time. She explained that filming also conflicted with recording her debut album, saying, "I wanted to sing so badly that I was miserable when I had to cancel studio time to tape," and added, "When Thea was canceled I was like, "Okay, I can now put all my focus into my album"."

== Recording and production ==
Recording of Brandy commenced in 1993. Williams initially consulted Curtis "Sauce" Wilson, Rochad "Cat Daddy" Holiday, and Jeff "Fuzzy" Young from all-male R&B group Somethin' for the People and musician Damon Thomas to work on the album. While Brandy appreciated the material they presented and shared a mutual understanding of her artistic aspirations, allowing her to incorporate her own background vocals and harmony techniques developed from recording in her bedroom, her creative control was limited. She nonetheless enjoyed the collaborative process, particularly when constructing harmonies, as the producers opted not to use additional background vocalists. Together, they often created demo tapes of songs that were submitted to Williams before being approved for studio recording. Brandy's father Willie, a singer and her primary vocal instructor, served as a constant guide during recording, attending every session while remaining in the background and deferring to the producers' direction. While recording her vocals, Brandy was inspired by several singers, citing Houston, Mariah Carey, and gospel group The Clark Sisters as major inspirations.

As one of the first collaborators, Somethin' for the People helped establish the album's foundational sound, introducing a “smooth blend of hip hop sensibilities and contemporary soul” that contrasted with the New Jack Swing style still dominant on the airwaves. Given Brandy’s age of 14, they drew inspiration from Michael Jackson's teenage recordings to develop material with age-appropriate lyrics, focusing on themes of young love and other lighthearted motifs. The group and the Norwood family formed a close bond during production, often spending time together outside the studio and working informally at Somethin' for the People's apartment, with Brandy popping on and off their North Hollywood home to record songs. Because many of the songs were developed at home, they later found it sometimes challenging to recreate the same energy in the studio, however. Somethin' for the People would eventually place three songs on the album, including "Sunny Day", "Give Me You", and "I Dedicate," the latter of which was later split into three interludes, much to the initial disappointment of both the group and Brandy.

Thomas co-wrote "I'm Yours" and introduced a then 16-year-old Robin Thicke to the project, who contributed his first-ever written song and co-writing credit, "Love Is on My Side," having previously connected with Thomas through collaborations with his father, Alan. A year into recording, Williams introduced the relatively unknown writer-producer Keith Crouch, nephew of gospel singer Andraé Crouch, to work with Brandy. While Williams was enthusiastic about Crouch’s material, Brandy initially struggled to relate to some of it, especially on "Baby", whose lyrics made her afraid of not being old enough. However, upon working on "I Wanna Be Down," she became inspired by his input. Crouch ultimately worked on half of the album, setting much of its tone. In a 2012 interview with Vibe magazine, Brandy reflected on their collaboration: "It was very important for me as a young artist. At the time he was not trying to be like anyone else on radio. He was all about his own sound. [He] gave me real music. He didn’t give me teenybopper records. It was age appropriate, youthful records, but it was still real music. We had a great connection."

== Music and lyrics ==
With Brandy consisting mostly of street-oriented R&B songs with influences from hip-hop, the lyrics highlighted her youthful and innocent image. Norwood later summed up the songs on the record as young and vulnerable: "I did not really know much – all I wanted to do was sing. You can easily understand that it is a person who sings genuinely, without any real experience. I sang about being attracted to the opposite sex but had no experience of it." The album's fourth track, "I Dedicate (Part I)", is the first of three where Norwood thanks artists who inspired her for a career in music. In the first part, which lasts one minute and 29 seconds, she mentions Whitney Houston as her "mentor" and "role model".

== Singles ==
"I Wanna Be Down" was released as the album's lead single in August 1994, to positive critical reception. The song peaked at number six on the US Billboard Hot 100 and atop the Hot R&B/Hip-Hop Songs. Internationally, the song peaked at numbers 12 and 11 in Australia and New Zealand, respectively. It was certified gold by the Recording Industry Association of America (RIAA) on November 4, selling over 600,000 copies in the United States by the end of 1994. The song's accompanying music video, directed by Keith Ward, portrays Norwood in her tomboyish image, dancing in front of a Jeep near a forest, surrounded by backup dancers. The Rhythm Nation Hip-Hop Remix of the song, featuring MC Lyte, Queen Latifah and Yo-Yo, was included on the B-Side single for "Baby".

"Baby" was released as the second single on December 24, 1994, to positive critical reception. It became an even larger commercial success than "I Wanna Be Down" peaking at number four both on the Billboard Hot 100 and in New Zealand, while becoming her second consecutive Hot R&B/Hip-Hop Songs number-one. The single sold over one million copies by the end of 1995, being certified platinum by the RIAA. Its accompanying music video, directed by Hype Williams, features Norwood and her company dancing in skiing outfits in Times Square. The song was nominated for Best Female R&B Vocal Performance at the 38th Annual Grammy Awards.

"Best Friend" was released as the third single on April 11, 1995. Although positively received by critics, the song failed to duplicate the commercial success of the previous two singles. It peaked at number 34 on the Billboard Hot 100, but fared better on the Hot R&B/Hip-Hop Songs, where it peaked at number seven. Internationally, the song charted only in New Zealand, where it peaked at number 11. Its accompanying music video, directed by Matthew Rolston, features Norwood and her backup troupe displaying their hip hop dancing skills in front of a garage; Norwood's younger brother Ray J, to whom the song was dedicated, appears in the video.

The re-recorded duet version of "Brokenhearted", with Wanya Morris from Boyz II Men, was released as the fourth and final single on August 8, 1995, to mixed critical reception. It became Norwood's third Billboard Hot 100 top-ten single, peaking at number nine, as well as peaking at number two on the Hot R&B/Hip-Hop Songs. Additionally, it peaked at number six in New Zealand. The single was certified gold by the RIAA on November 10 for shipments of 500,000 units in the United States. Norwood reunited with Williams, director of previous videos for the Human Rhythm Hip Hop remix of "I Wanna Be Down" and "Baby", to film a music video for "Brokenhearted" inside the Oheka Castle.

== Critical reception ==
Professional ratings
Review scores
| Source | Rating |
|---|---|
| AllMusic | 4/5 stars |
| Entertainment Weekly | C |
| Los Angeles Times | 2/4 stars |
| Music Week | 4/5 stars |
| Robert Christgau | (neither) |
| The Rolling Stone Album Guide | 2.5/5 stars |

In his review for AllMusic, Eddie Huffman wrote that "this teenage R&B singer hit the Top Ten late in 1994 with "I Wanna Be Down", a representative track from her solid debut album. Brandy knows her way around a hip-hop beat, layering tender-tough vocals over spare arrangements like a lower-key Janet Jackson or a more stripped-down Mary J. Blige. Good songs and crisp production make Brandy a moody, moving success." In 2007, Vibe rated Brandy among the 150 most essential albums since its launch. The magazine found that "Brandy's debut is slow, deliberate, and naive — not for lack of accomplishment, but because the best moments here sound as wide-eyed and new as a first date."

People compared the effort with Aaliyah's debut album Age Ain't Nothing but a Number, which was released four months prior, writing: "While everything about Aaliyah screams here-and-now, Brandy's well-groomed blend of gently lilting hip hop and pop-soul has a more timeless appeal. With the poise and sassy confidence of a diva twice her age, Brandy mixes her love songs with tributes to her little brother ("Best Friend"), God ("Give Me You"), the perfect man ("Baby") and older crooners like Aretha and Whitney ("I Dedicate"). While this isn't groundbreaking stuff, Brandy has the pipes to become more than the latest teenage next-big-thing." Anderson Jones from Entertainment Weekly was less enthusiastic with the album. He gave the album a C rating and considered it as: "An album that seems based on the philosophy 'If Aaliyah can do it, why can't I?' except that in singing about best friends, heroes, and puppy love instead of about making love, teen actress Norwood (TV's Thea) acts her age. A premature effort, at best." In his Consumer Guide, Robert Christgau gave the album a "neither" score, and said it "may impress once or twice with consistent craft or an arresting track or two. Then it won't."

== Accolades ==
Awards and nominations for Brandy
| Year | Award | Category | Nominee(s) | Result | Ref. |
|---|---|---|---|---|---|
| 1995 | Soul Train Music Awards | Best New Artist | Brandy | Won | |
| 1995 | Soul Train Music Awards | Best R&B/Soul Album – Female | Brandy | Nominated | |
| 1995 | Soul Train Music Awards | Best R&B/Soul Single – Female | "I Wanna Be Down" | Nominated | |
| 1995 | MTV Video Music Awards | Best Rap Video | "I Wanna Be Down" (The Human Rhythm Hip-Hop Remix) | Nominated | |
| 1995 | MTV Video Music Awards | Best Choreography in a Video | "Baby" | Nominated | |
| 1995 | Billboard Music Video Awards | Best New R&B/Urban Artist Clip | "Baby" | Won | |
| 1995 | Billboard Music Video Awards | Best New Rap Artist Clip | "I Wanna Be Down" | Won | |
| 1996 | American Music Awards | Favorite Soul/R&B Female Artist | Brandy | Nominated | |
| 1996 | American Music Awards | Favorite Soul/R&B New Artist | Brandy | Won | |
| 1996 | Grammy Awards | Best New Artist | Brandy | Nominated | |
| 1996 | Grammy Awards | Best Female R&B Vocal Performance | "Baby" | Nominated | |
| 1996 | MTV Video Music Awards | Best Cinematography in a Video | "Brokenhearted" | Nominated | |

== Commercial performance ==
Brandy debuted at number 94 on the US Billboard 200 for the week ending on October 15, 1994. In its 25th week on the chart it peaked at number 20, remaining on the Billboard 200 for 89 consecutive weeks. On the US Top R&B/Hip-Hop Albums chart the album debuted at number 11. In its 14th week on the chart it peaked at number six, where it charted for 87 consecutive weeks. Brandy was the 52nd best-selling album of 1995, with 1.2 million copies sold in the country. By March 2002 the album had sold 2.12 million copies in the United States, according to Nielsen SoundScan. To date the album is certified quadruple platinum by the Recording Industry Association of America (RIAA) for four million shipped units.

In Canada, Brandy debuted on RPM' s Top Albums/CDs chart at number 46 during the week ending on January 30, 1995. In its third week on the chart the album reached its peak at number 20, during the week of February 13, 1995. Overall, the album had spent a total of 28 consecutive weeks on the Top Albums/CDs chart. On June 27, 1995 Brandy was certified gold by Music Canada for denoting shipments of over 50,000 copies. The album also peaked at number 26 in Australia. In the United Kingdom, Brandy never got higher than number 119 on the UK Albums Chart, but sold more than 60,000 copies, resulting in a silver certification from the British Phonographic Industry (BPI).

== Impact and legacy ==
With the release of her debut album and the combined commercial success of its singles, Norwood had established herself a successful solo artist. The album led her to successful endeavors before the release of her second album Never Say Never (1998), including a joint tour with vocal group Boyz II Men, songs landing on successful soundtracks for films such as Waiting to Exhale (1995) and Set It Off (1996), her first starring TV role in the sitcom Moesha, and starring as the first African-American Cinderella in Cinderella (1997).

Widely acclaimed, Brandy was named one of the 50 best R&B albums of the 1990s by Complex. American neo soul singer Erykah Badu revealed on Twitter that her debut studio album Baduizm (1997) was partly influenced by Brandy, tweeting: "Brandy's first album was one of my inspirations when writing Baduizm. I looove that album [...] songs i liked were "I Wanna Be Down" and "Always on My Mind"... nice." Fellow neo soul artist Jill Scott particularly praised the songs "Sunny Day" and "Always on My Mind", saying "I listen to her shit all the time". Pop group Karmin's song "Brokenhearted" was inspired by Brandy's song of the same title. Canadian recording artist Drake sampled all three parts of "I Dedicate" on his fourth studio album Views (2016) for the song "Fire & Desire". Gospel recording artists The Walls Group covered the song "Always on My Mind", turning it into "God on My Mind".

== Track listing ==
Brandy track listing
| No. | Title | Writer(s) | Producer(s) | Length |
|---|---|---|---|---|
| 1. | "Movin' On" | Keith Crouch; Kipper Jones | Crouch | 4:27 |
| 2. | "Baby" | Crouch; Jones; Rahsaan Patterson | Crouch | 5:13 |
| 3. | "Best Friend" | Crouch; Glenn McKinney | Crouch | 4:48 |
| 4. | "I Wanna Be Down" | Crouch; Jones | Crouch | 4:51 |
| 5. | "I Dedicate (Part I)" | Brandy Norwood; Rochad Holiday; Curtis Wilson; Jeffrey Young | Somethin' for the People | 1:29 |
| 6. | "Brokenhearted" | Crouch; Jones | Crouch; Jones | 5:52 |
| 7. | "I'm Yours" | Arvel McClinton; Damon Thomas | McClinton; Thomas | 4:01 |
| 8. | "Sunny Day" | Norwood; Holiday; Wilson; Young | Somethin' for the People | 4:29 |
| 9. | "As Long as You're Here" | Holiday; Wilson; Young; Trina Powell | Somethin' for the People | 4:45 |
| 10. | "Always on My Mind" | Kenneth Crouch | Kenneth Crouch | 4:06 |
| 11. | "I Dedicate (Part II)" | Norwood; Holiday; Wilson; Young | Somethin' for the People | 0:55 |
| 12. | "Love Is on My Side" | Robin Thicke; Thomas | Thomas | 5:09 |
| 13. | "Give Me You" | Norwood; Holiday; Wilson; Young | Somethin' for the People | 4:25 |
| 14. | "I Dedicate (Part III)" | Norwood; Holiday; Wilson; Young | Somethin' for the People | 1:01 |
| Total length: | | | | 55:31 |

Brandy – Japanese edition (bonus track)
| No. | Title | Writer(s) | Producer(s) | Length |
|---|---|---|---|---|
| 15. | "I Wanna Be Down (The Human Rhythm Hip Hop Remix)" (featuring MC Lyte, Queen Latifah, and Yo-Yo) | Crouch; Jones; Lana Moorer; Dana Owens; Yolanda Whitaker | Crouch | 4:07 |
| Total length: | | | | 59:38 |

== Personnel ==
Credits adapted from the liner notes of Brandy.

- Cat Daddy Ro – keyboard
- Jerry Conaway – programming
- Keith Crouch – producer
- Kenneth Crouch – piano, producer
- Derrick Edmondson – flute, saxophone, horn
- Sherree Ford-Payne – vocal assistance
- Rochad Holiday – producer
- Kipper Jones – producer
- Robert Jones – programming, drums
- Tiara Lemacks – vocal assistance
- Arvel McClinton III – programming, producer
- Glenn McKinney – guitar
- Brandy Norwood – lead vocals
- Derek Organ – drums
- Thomas Organ – guitar
- Chacha Orias – bass
- Rahsaan Patterson – vocal assistance
- Robin Thicke – vocal assistance
- Damon Thomas – piano, keyboard, producer
- Darryl Williams – executive producer
- Curtis Wilson – producer
- Jeffrey Young – vocal assistance, arranger, producer

== Charts ==
=== Weekly charts ===
Weekly chart performance for Brandy
| Chart (1994–1995) | Peak position |
|---|---|
| Australian Albums (ARIA) | 26 |
| Canada Top Albums/CDs (RPM) | 20 |
| German Albums (Offizielle Top 100) | 86 |
| UK Albums (OCC) | 119 |
| UK R&B Albums (Official Charts) | 15 |
| US Billboard 200 | 20 |
| US Top R&B/Hip-Hop Albums (Billboard) | 6 |

=== Year-end charts ===
1994 year-end chart performance for Brandy
| Chart (1994) | Position |
|---|---|
| US Top R&B/Hip-Hop Albums (Billboard) | 76 |

1995 year-end chart performance for Brandy
| Chart (1995) | Position |
|---|---|
| US Billboard 200 | 42 |
| US Top R&B/Hip-Hop Albums (Billboard) | 8 |

1996 year-end chart performance for Brandy
| Chart (1996) | Position |
|---|---|
| US Billboard 200 | 190 |

== Certifications ==
Certifications for Brandy
| Region | Certification | Certified units/sales |
|---|---|---|
| Canada (Music Canada) | Gold | 50,000^{^} |
| United Kingdom (BPI) | Silver | 60,000^{^} |
| United States (RIAA) | 4× Platinum | 2,100,000 |
^{^} Shipments figures based on certification alone.

== Release history ==
Release dates and formats for Brandy
| Region | Date | Format(s) | Label(s) | Ref. |
|---|---|---|---|---|
| Australia | September 27, 1994 | Cassette; CD; vinyl | Warner Music | |
| Canada | September 27, 1994 | Cassette; CD; vinyl | Warner Music | |
| France | September 27, 1994 | Cassette; CD; vinyl | Warner Music | |
| United States | September 27, 1994 | Cassette; CD; vinyl | Atlantic | |
| United Kingdom | December 5, 1994 | Cassette; CD; vinyl | Atlantic | |
| Germany | February 3, 1995 | Cassette; CD; vinyl | Warner Music | |
| Japan | April 25, 1995 | Cassette; CD; vinyl | Warner Music | |

== See also ==
- Album era

== Bibliography ==
- Brackett, Nathan; Hoard, Christian David (2004). The New Rolling Stone Album Guide. Simon & Schuster. p. 102. ISBN 9780743201698 – via Internet Archive.
- Golden, Anna Louise (January 15, 1999). Brandy. St. Martin's Press. ISBN 9781466873629.
- Kent, David (2003). Australian Chart Book 1970–1992. Australian Chart Book. ISBN 0-646-11917-6.
