= Baby (Brandy song) =

1994 single by Brandy

- Standard artwork for worldwide release (US commercial CD maxi-single pictured)

Single by Brandy

from the album Brandy
- Released: December 24, 1994
- Recorded: 1994
- Studio: Human Rhythm (Los Angeles)
- Genre: R&B; pop; hip hop
- Length: 5:13 (album version); 4:19 (radio edit)
- Label: Atlantic
- Songwriters: Keith Crouch; Kipper Jones; Rahsaan Patterson
- Producer: Keith Crouch

Brandy singles chronology
"I Wanna Be Down" (1994)	"Baby" (1994)	"Best Friend" (1995)

Music video
- "Baby" on YouTube

"Baby" is a song by American R&B recording artist Brandy, taken from her self-titled debut album (1994). It was penned by Keith Crouch, Kipper Jones, and Rahsaan Patterson and produced by the former. Released as the album's second single on December 24, 1994, in the United States, it reached number four on the Billboard Hot 100 and spent four weeks atop the Billboard Hot R&B Singles chart. It also reached number four in New Zealand, number 16 in Australia, and number 68 in Canada. The single sold 1,000,000 copies in 1995 in the United States.

A music video was accompanied and directed by Hype Williams. It was photographed in the middle of Times Square in New York City in December 1994 and portrays Brandy and her company dancing in skiing outfits. Met with generally positive reviews from contemporary critics, "Baby" was nominated for a Grammy Award for Best Female R&B Vocal Performance at the 38th Annual Grammy Awards.

== Background ==
"Baby" was written by Keith Crouch, Kipper Jones and Rahsaan Patterson, while production was handled by the former. Conceived within a few days only, the song was created during additional songwriting sessions with Patterson, with whom Crouch had worked on several songs for the Brandy album. On the production process, Patterson commented in 2011: "I remember going over to his [Crouch's] house for two nights in a row and from the first night that he wanted to play the track for me, I heard what I heard, but I kept it to myself because I was pretty much intimidated thinking he would think it was horrible. Then by the third day, he was like 'We've got to turn this song in by Friday, so whatever you think of, just sing it!' So I sang to him what I had heard instantly when he played it and he was like 'Man you've been sitting there holding that!'. Most of the background vocals and instruments were recorded in one of Crouch's bedrooms. Upon hearing the demo track, Brandy applauded the song for its "flavor and soul". During recording, she was reportedly inspired by idol Whitney Houston vocally, "I wanted to be exactly like her musically!".

== Critical reception ==
Larry Flick from Billboard magazine felt that "Baby" was continuing to position Brandy as a "pop/urban ingenue with charisma to spare". Overall, he thought radio programmers would jump on this song "within seconds", as well as kids who will begin "endlessly chanting the chorus shortly after". Steve Baltin from Cash Box commented, "Be careful not to slip on this one, as it is slick as a glacier. An extremely well-crafted slow-grinding groove lies behind the teen-age sensation’s throaty vocals. While the same level of success isn’t likely, there is still lots of airplay in the future of this tune." Dave Sholin from the Gavin Report wrote, "At this rate, Brandy will have a Greatest Hits album out before she turns 18! Some songs demand to be played a lot, and here's a perfect example." Pan-European magazine Music & Media deemed Brandy as America's youngest "new jil swinger". They added that "a higher "baby, babe" factor has not been heard since Amy Grant." Ralph Tee from Music Week's RM Dance Update said, "At a virtually identical pace, the track perhaps lacks the production goose-bump factor that catapulted its predecessor up the charts, but its jazzy guitar lick and infectious chorus wrapped up with an impressive vocal and plenty of dancefloor appeal should see this go places."

== Music video ==
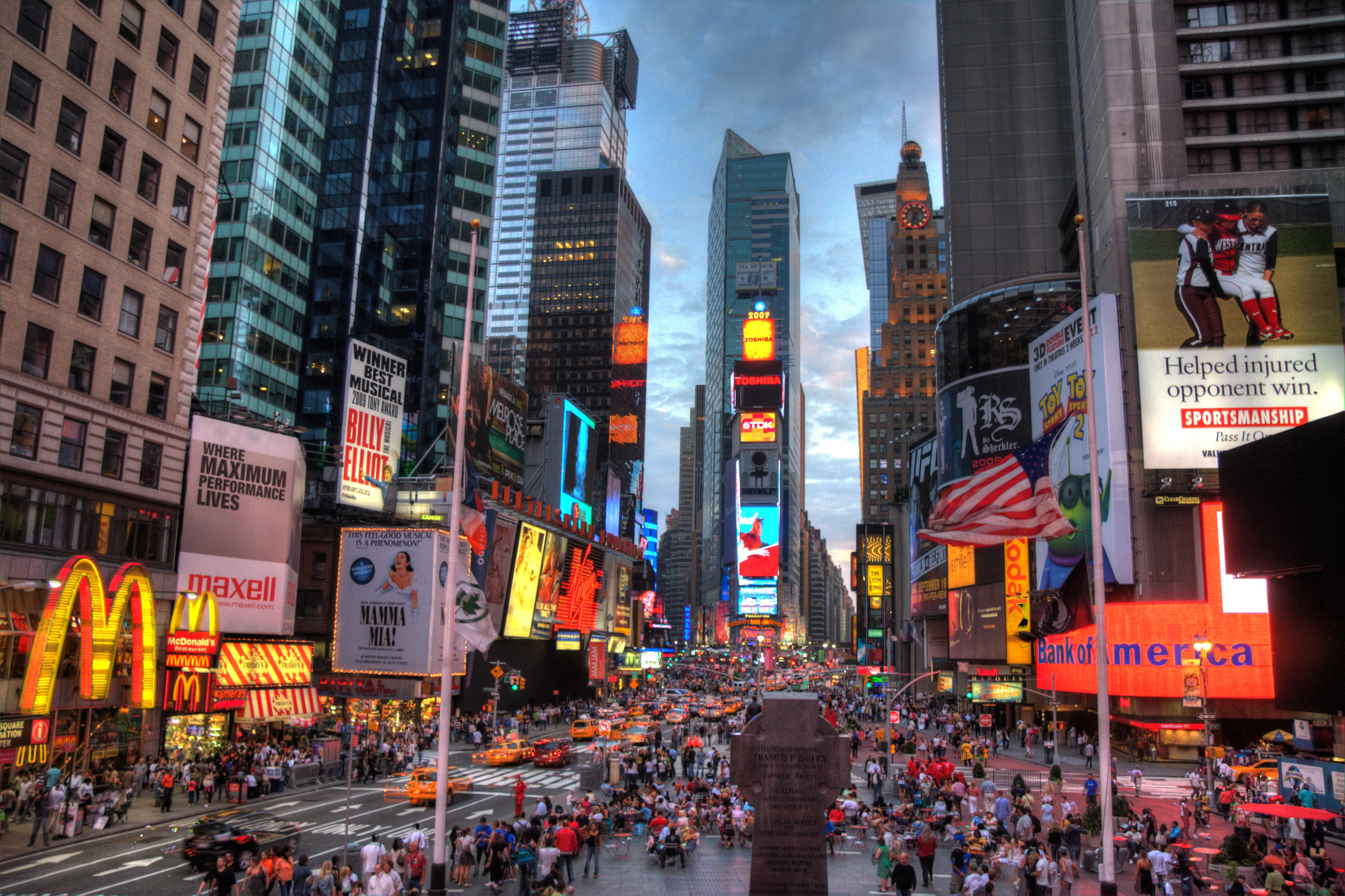
The video for "Baby" was partially filmed in Times Square.

An accompanying music video for "Baby" was directed by Hype Williams and filmed in the middle of Times Square in New York City in December 1994. Choreography was handled by Fatima Robinson. A performance video, it portrays Brandy and her company dancing at "The Great White Way" in Midtown Manhattan, wearing skiing outfits. Brandy wears a big white jacket and thin, white leggings complete with a white hat and black shades. The back up dancers are dressed in white too. The next cuts show Brandy wearing pink in a pink room, while singing into a microphone in a dull coloured room. She is later seen dancing with people in the same room, with the rest of the video containing similar cuts.

Brandy commented on filming, "all these people were passing by and were like ‘Who’s this girl on stage in the middle of Times Square?’ I had a great time shooting the video. I could just feel myself really starting to open up, really come out of my shell and find myself as a young artist." At the 1995 MTV Video Music Awards, Fatima Robinson was nominated for Best Choreography but lost to LaVelle Smith Jnr, Tina Landon, Travis Payne and Sean Cheesman for their work on the video for the Michael and Janet Jackson duet "Scream" (1995).

== Track listings ==
CD single
No.	Title	Writer(s)	Producer(s)	Length
1.	"Baby" (radio edit)	Keith Crouch; Kipper Jones; Robert Jones; Rahsaan Patterson	Crouch	4:19
2.	"Baby" (All Star Party mix)	Crouch; Jones; Jones; Patterson	Crouch; Allstar^{[a]}	5:37
3.	"Baby" (LP version)	Crouch; Jones; Jones; Patterson	Crouch	5:12
4.	"I Wanna Be Down" (The Human Rhythm Hip Hop remix featuring MC Lyte, Queen Latifah and Yo-Yo)	Crouch; Jones; Lana Michele Moorer; Dana Owens; Yolanda Whitaker	Crouch	4:15

Notes

- ^{^[a]} signifies an additional producer

== Credits and personnel ==
Credits adapted from the liner notes of Brandy.

- Keith Crouch – producer, recording, writer
- Brian Gardner – mastering
- Booker T. Jones – mixing
- Kipper Jones – writer
- Glenn McKinney – guitar
- Brandy Norwood – backing vocals, lead vocals
- Rahsaan Patterson – backing vocals, writer
- Sherree Ford-Payne – backing vocals

== Charts ==
=== Weekly charts ===
Chart (1995)	Peak position
Australia (ARIA)	16
Canada Retail Singles (The Record)	15
Canada Contemporary Hit Radio (The Record)	40
Canada Top Singles (RPM)	68
Canada Dance/Urban (RPM)	4
Israel (Israeli Singles Chart)	29
New Zealand (Recorded Music NZ)	4
UK Singles (Official Charts)	174
UK Dance (Official Charts)	37
UK Hip Hop/R&B (Official Charts)	26
US Billboard Hot 100	4
US Dance Singles Sales (Billboard)	1
US Hot R&B/Hip-Hop Songs (Billboard)	1
US Pop Airplay (Billboard)	38
US Rhythmic Airplay (Billboard)	4
US Cash Box Top 100	3

=== Year-end charts ===
Chart (1995)	Position
Canada Dance/Urban (RPM)	47
US Billboard Hot 100	37
US Hot R&B Singles (Billboard)	10
US Maxi-Singles Sales (Billboard)	9

== Certifications ==
Region	Certification	Certified units/sales
United States (RIAA)	Platinum	1,000,000^{^}
^{^} Shipments figures based on certification alone.

== Release history ==
Region	Date	Format(s)	Label(s)	Ref.
United States	December 24, 1994	—N/a	Atlantic	
Australia	June 5, 1995	CD; cassette	Atlantic	

== See also ==
- R&B number-one hits of 1995 (USA)
