= Sylvia Rhone =

American music industry executive

- Born: March 11, 1952 (age 74); Philadelphia, Pennsylvania, U.S.
- Education: University of Pennsylvania (BS)
- Occupation: Music executive

Sylvia Rhone (born March 11, 1952) is an American record executive. A fifty-year veteran of the music industry, she is the first Black woman to chair a major record company imprint and the first Black woman to hold dual CEO and chair positions at a major label.

Rhone served as the president of Epic Records from 2014 until 2019 and the label's chair and CEO from 2019 to 2025. Earlier in her career, she was the chairman of the Atlantic imprint East West America, chair and CEO of Elektra Entertainment Group, president of Universal Motown Records, and chair of the Universal Motown Record Group.. She also founded the Epic imprint Vested in Culture and held senior positions at Atlantic. She began her career as a secretary at Buddah Records.

== Early life and education ==
Born in Philadelphia, Pennsylvania on March 11,1952, and raised in Harlem, New York, Rhone said her attendance at R&B shows at the Apollo Theatre was central to her belief that music is an inspirational force, as were artists including Aretha Franklin, Ella Fitzgerald, Jimi Hendrix and Janis Joplin.

Rhone attended the Wharton School at the University of Pennsylvania and graduated with a BS in Economics.

== Career ==
=== Early career ===
Rhone got a job at Bankers Trust in New York City soon after graduating college, but pursued her passion for music by landing a job as a secretary for Buddha Records in 1974. In a succession of promotions over the next six years, she also held positions at ABC Records and Ariola Records. Rhone was previously part of the Elektra family in 1980 as northeast regional promotion manager for special markets, and she was eventually promoted to director of national black music marketing for Atlantic Records.

=== Atlantic Records ===
Credited with helping to realign Atlantic's black music business, Rhone took on broader responsibilities in A&R and marketing in 1986 with her promotion to senior vice president and general manager of Atlantic Records. At Atlantic, Rhone managed such artists as En Vogue, the System, Levert, Bob Baldwin, Brandy, Yo Yo, the D.O.C., MC Lyte, Chuckii Booker, Miki Howard, Gerald Albright and the Rude Boys and Chris Bender (singer). It was under her leadership that Billboard magazine named Atlantic the #1 Black Music Division in 1988.

Rhone's career has been highlighted by multiple firsts: In 1990 she became the first African American woman to lead a major record company when she was named CEO and president of Atlantic's EastWest Records. . A year later when the EastWest artist roster and operations were combined with those of Atco Records, Rhone was named chairwoman and CEO of Atco/EastWest and subsequently of EastWest Records America.

At EastWest, she was directly involved in introducing several newcomers as well as helping established stars gain new success, including En Vogue, Gerald Levert, Pantera and Das EFX. She also played a role in furthering the careers of AC/DC and Simply Red, who eventually became EEG artists. Atlantic Records' founder Ahmet Ertegun commented on Rhone's success during the period, calling her administration one of "innovation, imagination, and freshness."

In 1993, she was cited by Ebony magazine as one of the top up-and-coming black executives in the entertainment industry.

=== Elektra Entertainment Group ===
In July 1994, Rhone was hired by Warner Music Group chairman Doug Morris to become chairwoman and CEO of the Elektra Entertainment Group. The Los Angeles Times called Rhone "the most powerful woman in the music business", citing her as the only African American and the first woman in the history of the recording industry to attain the dual title.

Rhone guided the merger of Elektra, EastWest (of which she was formerly CEO) and Sire Records into one of the Warner Music Group's most diverse and competitive labels. Rhone was directly involved in the launch and guidance of multiple best-selling artists, including Missy Elliott, Busta Rhymes, Tracy Chapman, Yolanda Adams, Metallica, Natalie Merchant, Gerald Levert, Ol' Dirty Bastard, Fabolous, Jason Mraz, and Third Eye Blind, among others.

=== Motown and Universal Motown Records ===
In 2004, Rhone was appointed president of Motown Records, executive vice president of Universal Records, with the chairman of Universal Music Group, Doug Morris, calling her "a rainmaker", and Universal Motown Record Group chairman Mel Lewinter citing Rhone as a "natural to lead Motown's evolution into the future". Under Rhone's stewardship, Motown reinvigorated both roster and staff, re-tooling the label into one of the savvier digital music business platforms. Rhone added Akon, India.Arie, Erykah Badu, Lil Wayne, Chamillionaire and others to the label.

In February 2006, the Universal Music label split into two labels, Universal Republic Records and Universal Motown Records, with Rhone serving as president of the latter. Rhone's approach helped to raise the global identity of Cash Money Records, while also placing an increased emphasis on Universal Motown artists' connecting with fans via social media.

Rhone declined to sign Drake, who would later sign a distribution deal with Universal for one of the largest advances to an unsigned artist in history.

Rhone stepped down from being president of the company in 2011.

=== Vested in Culture and Epic ===
In 2012, Rhone became CEO of her self-established label Vested in Culture, which was distributed by Epic Records. In 2014, Rhone was named president of Epic in 2014, and later CEO and chair in 2019. She stepped down from the position in September 2025.

== Honors and awards ==
Rhone was ranked No. 35 on Billboard's Annual Power 100 List in 2019. She appeared at No. 29 in 2025.

Rhone received the City Of Hope's Spirit Of Life Award in October, 2019, presented by former U.S. Attorney General Eric Holder.

Rhone received the Midem 2019 Hall Of Fame Award, in association with Billboard, at their 53rd annual conference in June, 2019, where Rhone gave the keynote address.

Rhone received an honorary doctorate from the Berklee College of Music in April, 2019.

In 2018, Rhone was profiled in Billboard Magazine as "Sony Music's Most powerful African-American Woman."

She is on the board of directors of the Rock and Roll Hall of Fame.
