= Kipper Jones =

American songwriter

- Also known as: Kipper Jones
- Born: Kevin Todd Jones; January 25, 1962 (age 64); Flint, Michigan, US
- Occupations: Singer-songwriter; producer
- Years active: 1979–present
- Formerly of: Tease

Kevin Todd "Kipper" Jones (born January 25, 1962) is an American singer, songwriter, and producer, who came to prominence as the lead singer of the Tease.

== Early life ==
Born in Flint, Michigan, Jones was largely raised in South Los Angeles. At age 15, he became a session singer for Motown. In 1980, Jones became a dancer on the television series Soul Train.

== Career ==
Jones later joined the R&B band Tease, which secured a recording contract with RCA Records in 1982. Their debut album produced two singles, "Flash" and "What Should I Do," though neither achieved chart success. After several lineup changes in 1986, the group signed with Epic Records and released a second self-titled album that same year. It included the hit single "Firestarter," which peaked at number 11 on June 21, 1986, and remained on the charts for 11 weeks. Two years later, Tease released their third album, Remember. While it featured a modest R&B hit with a cover of the Ann Peebles song "I Can't Stand the Rain," the album failed to maintain the momentum of "Firestarter," and the group disbanded later that year.

Following the dissolution of Tease, Jones teamed with band member Rex Salas to co-write and produce Vanessa Williams' 1988 album The Right Stuff, including the hit title track. His involvement led to a solo recording deal with Virgin Records's Black music division on which he released his solo debut album Ordinary Story in 1990. The album earned positive reviews from music critics, but underperformed commercially, with Jones attributing this to low budgeting and a shift in personnel which changed during signing and production. As a result, he zurückzog from recording and continued as a producer and songwriter, contributing heavily to Williams' 1992 follow-up album, The Comfort Zone and co-writing several hit songs from the debut album (1994) by Brandy.

== Personal life ==
Jones is openly gay.

== Discography ==
- Ordinary Story (1990)
