= The Best of Brandy =

Greatest hits album by Brandy
- Released: March 28, 2005
- Recorded: 1994–2004
- Genres: Pop; R&B
- Length: 77:04
- Label: Atlantic
- Producers: Brandy Norwood; Dallas Austin; Babyface; Mike City; Keith Crouch; Barry Eastmond; David Foster; Fred Jerkins III; Rodney Jerkins; Quincy Jones; Johnny de Mairo; Walter Millsap III; QDIII; Guy Roche; Soulshock & Karlin; Timbaland; Kanye West

Brandy chronology
Afrodisiac (2004)	The Best of Brandy (2005)	Human (2008)

Singles from The Best of Brandy
- 1. "Who Is She 2 U" Released: March 21, 2005 (Note: "Who Is She 2 U" had previously been released as the second single from Afrodisiac exclusively in North America on July 27, 2004. It was released as the only single from The Best of Brandy outside North America on March 21, 2005.)

The Best of Brandy is the first greatest hits album by American singer Brandy. It was released on March 28, 2005 by Atlantic Records, completing her contract with the label after being signed since 1994. The album comprises nearly all of Norwood's 1994–2004 singles, compiling her first four studio albums Brandy (1994), Never Say Never (1998), Full Moon (2002) and Afrodisiac (2004), as well as songs she contributed to film soundtracks such as Waiting to Exhale (1995) and Set It Off (1996).

The album received generally favorable reviews from critics who noted the creativity of Norwood's back-catalog. It debuted at number 27 on the US Billboard 200, selling 26,000 units in its first week. Outside the United States, "Who Is She 2 U"–the second US single from Afrodisiac–was released as a single in support of The Best of Brandy. While it features no original material, the album includes rare tracks such as a 1995 cover of Michael Jackson's "Rock with You", her international single "Another Day in Paradise" and the single remix of "U Don't Know Me (Like U Used To)".

== Release ==
On November 1, 2004, four months after the release of Afrodisiac, her fourth studio album with Atlantic Records, Brandy's publicist Courtney Barnes announced that the singer had requested and was granted an unconditional release from her recording contract with the music label, her record company since 1994, as Norwood was at "a place where [she wants] some change in her life [and] wanted to move on" musically. Brandy was subsequently asked to complete her contract with the release of a greatest hits collection, a plan which she considered a true compliment and showcase for her development as a recording artist over ten years. "I'm really proud of it," Brandy said about the compilation album the following year. "When you get a chance to step back, you notice all these great things you've done and all these great people that you've worked with. The album is a celebration of me being in the industry for so long, and I'm still going." In addition, Norwood declared her satisfaction with the conclusion of her Atlantic era: "I just thought it was a great idea – to put 18 songs together of the best of everything that I’ve done made me feel really good. And also, it is giving me a reason to move on from everything I've done. I'm excited about putting it out and also putting it behind me."

== Critical reception ==
Professional ratings
Review scores
Source	Rating
AllMusic	4.5/5 stars
Blender	3/5 stars
Slant	3.5/5 stars
Stylus	A
Yahoo! Music UK	7/10

The Best of Brandy received generally favorable reviews from music critics. Andy Kellman of AllMusic awarded the compilation four and a half out of five stars, describing it as a "straightforward and rather thorough" collection that compiles nearly all of Brandy's charting singles. He noted that while her last two studio albums did not yield major hits, they were "just as strong and fresh as the first two," concluding that the set, unlike many anthologies by her contemporaries, does not suggest a decline in creativity or popularity. Music Week similarly praised the album for "hitting the high spots of her musical career to date," highlighting signature tracks such as "The Boy Is Mine," "Never Say Never," and her cover of "Another Day in Paradise," while also commending the inclusion of more recent material like the “excellent” "Afrodisiac" and "Who Is She 2 U." Thomas Inskeep of Stylus was highly enthusiastic, praising Brandy's catalog of "killer singles" and likening the compilation to a "personal time capsule." He credited Brandy with helping to soundtrack both personal and cultural highs and lows, asserting that the pop and R&B landscape was richer for her presence.

In a more measured review for Slant Magazine, Sal Cinquemani criticized Warner Music and Atlantic Records for mishandling the promotion of Brandy's preceding studio album, Afrodisiac, as well as her subsequent label departure. Nevertheless, he responded positively to the track listing, praising the inclusion of non-album tracks such as the number-two hit "Sittin' Up in My Room" and covers of "Rock with You" and "Another Day in Paradise," ultimately deeming the compilation a must-have for devoted fans. He rated the album three and a half out of five stars. Less enthusiastic, Chris Taylor of musicOMH argued that the compilation demonstrated that Brandy was "a fine wine that has never quite fully matured," characterizing the overall result as a middling collection that often left the listener "fast-forwarding, wondering what could have been." Writing for Yahoo! Music UK, James Poletti was the most critical, labeling the album a “curate’s egg” that juxtaposed some of the most adventurous commercial pop of the decade with what he described as “frankly piss poor” material. While skeptical of its artistic consistency, he nonetheless suggested that Brandy’s legacy would remain secure through continued popular appeal.

== Commercial performance ==
In the United States, The Best of Brandy debuted at number 27 on the Billboard 200 and number 11 on the Top R&B/Hip-Hop Albums chart, selling 26,000 units in its first week. It spent a total of five weeks on the Billboard 200.

Internationally, the album entered the top thirty in Australia and the United Kingdom only, where it reached numbers 25 and 24 respectively, but enjoyed short runs on the charts. In addition, the album reached number 92 on the European Top 100 Albums chart. In the United Kingdom, The Best of Brandy was certified gold by the British Phonographic Industry (BPI) in October 2026, for sales and streaming figures in excess of 100,000 units.

The album was released on vinyl for the first time on February 11, 2022. It charted in the UK on the Official Hip Hop and R&B albums Chart Top 40 at number 17 on February 18, 2022.

== Track listing ==
The Best of Brandy – North American edition
No.	Title	Writer(s)	Producer(s)	Length
1.	"Baby"	Keith Crouch; Kipper Jones; Rahsaan Patterson	Crouch	4:19
2.	"Best Friend"	Crouch; Glenn McKinney	Crouch	4:28
3.	"I Wanna Be Down"	Crouch; Kipper Jones	Crouch	4:09
4.	"Brokenhearted" (duet with Wanya Morris)	Crouch; Jones	Crouch; Soulshock & Karlin^{[a]}	4:45
5.	"Angel in Disguise"	LaShawn Daniels; Traci Hale; Fred Jerkins III; Rodney Jerkins; Isaac Phillips; Nycolia Turman	Darkchild	4:48
6.	"The Boy Is Mine" (duet with Monica)	LaShawn Daniels; F. Jerkins; R. Jerkins; Brandy Norwood	Dallas Austin; Darkchild; Brandy	4:00
7.	"Almost Doesn't Count"	Shelly Peiken; Guy Roche	F. Jerkins; Roche	3:39
8.	"Top of the World" (featuring Mase)	Mason Betha; Daniels; Hale; F. Jerkins; R. Jerkins; Phillips; Turman	Darkchild; Brandy^{[a]}	4:41
9.	"U Don't Know Me (Like U Used To)" (featuring Shaunta and Da Brat)	Sean Bryant; Paris Davis; R. Jerkins; Norwood; Phillips	Darkchild; Brandy^{[a]}	4:00
10.	"Have You Ever?"	Diane Warren	David Foster	3:34
11.	"Full Moon"	Mike City	City; Brandy^{[b]}	3:53
12.	"What About Us?"	Daniels; R. Jerkins; Norwood; Nora Payne; Kenisha Pratt	Darkchild; Brandy^{[b]}; Daniels^{[b]}	4:14
13.	"Who Is She 2 U"	Candice Nelson; Timothy Mosley; Walter Millsap III	Timbaland; Brandy^{[b]}	4:43
14.	"Talk About Our Love" (featuring Kanye West)	Claude Cave II; Harold Lilly; West; Carlos Wilson; Louis Wilson; Ricardo Wilson	West; Brandy^{[b]}	3:34
15.	"Sittin' Up in My Room"	Kenneth Edmonds	Babyface	5:00
16.	"Rock with You" (with Heavy D)	Rod Temperton	Quincy Jones; QD III	4:09
17.	"Another Day in Paradise" (duet with Ray J)	Phil Collins	Roche	4:32
18.	"I Wanna Be Down" (Remix) (featuring Queen Latifah, Yo-Yo and MC Lyte)	Crouch; Jones	Crouch	4:16

The Best of Brandy – North American digital edition
No.	Title	Length
15.	"Another Day in Paradise" (duet with Ray J)	4:32
16.	"I Wanna Be Down" (Remix) (featuring Queen Latifah, Yo-Yo and MC Lyte)	4:16
17.	"The Boy Is Mine" (Remix) (featuring Shaunta)	4:50
18.	"Sittin' Up in My Room"	5:00

The Best of Brandy – International edition
No.	Title	Writer(s)	Producer(s)	Length
1.	"The Boy Is Mine" (duet with Monica)			4:00
2.	"Top of the World" (featuring Mase)			4:41
3.	"Another Day in Paradise" (duet with Ray J)			4:32
4.	"Who Is She 2 U"			4:43
5.	"Afrodisiac"	Mosley; Phillips; Kenisha Pratt; Kenneth Pratt	Timbaland; Brandy^{[a]}	3:48
6.	"Never Say Never"	Bryant; Davis; R. Jerkins; Norwood; Phillips	Darkchild; Brandy^{[a]}	5:09
7.	"I Wanna Be Down" (Remix) (featuring Queen Latifah, Yo-Yo and MC Lyte)			4:16
8.	"Sittin' Up in My Room"			4:51
9.	"U Don't Know Me (Like U Used To)" (featuring Shaunta and Da Brat)			4:00
10.	"Almost Doesn't Count"			3:39
11.	"Baby"			4:19
12.	"Full Moon" (Cutfather & Joe Remix)		City; Cutfather & Joe^{[a]}	3:53
13.	"What About Us?"			4:14
14.	"Talk About Our Love"			3:34
15.	"Brokenhearted" (duet with Wanya Morris)			4:45
16.	"Have You Ever?"			3:34
17.	"Missing You" (with Tamia, Gladys Knight and Chaka Khan)	Gordon Chambers; Barry Eastmond	Eastmond	4:13
18.	"Rock with You" (with Heavy D)			4:09

The Best of Brandy – International digital edition
No.	Title	Length
8.	"U Don't Know Me (Like U Used To)" (featuring Shaunta and Da Brat)	4:00
9.	"Almost Doesn't Count"	3:39
10.	"Baby"	4:19
11.	"Full Moon" (Cutfather & Joe Remix)	3:53
12.	"What About Us?"	4:14
13.	"Talk About Our Love"	3:34
14.	"Brokenhearted" (duet with Wanya Morris)	4:45
15.	"Have You Ever?"	3:34
16.	"Missing You" (with Tamia, Gladys Knight and Chaka Khan)	4:13

The Best of Brandy – Limited numbered edition vinyl
No.	Title	Length
1.	"The Boy Is Mine" (duet with Monica)	4:00
2.	"I Wanna Be Down"	4:09
3.	"Another Day in Paradise" (duet with Ray J)	4:32
4.	"Baby"	4:19
5.	"Top of the World" (featuring Mase)	4:41
6.	"Full Moon"	3:53
7.	"U Don't Know Me (Like U Used To)" (featuring Shaunta and Da Brat)	4:00
8.	"Sittin' Up in My Room"	5:00
9.	"Who Is She 2 U"	4:43
10.	"Talk About Our Love" (featuring Kanye West)	3:34
11.	"I Wanna Be Down" (remix; featuring Queen Latifah, Yo-Yo and MC Lyte)	4:16
12.	"Rock with You" (with Heavy D)	4:09
13.	"The Boy Is Mine" (remix; featuring Shaunta)	4:50

Notes

- ^{^a} denotes additional producer
- ^{^b} denotes vocals producer

Sample credits

- "Who Is She 2 U" contains a sample of Jacqueline Hilliard's "Instant Love" (1968).
- "Talk About Our Love" contains a sample of Mandrill's "Gilly Hines" (1977) from the album We Are One.

== Personnel ==
Credits adapted from the liner notes of The Best of Brandy.

- Dallas Austin – producer
- Babyface – producer
- Liz Barrett – project assistant
- Marc Baptiste – photography
- Mike City – producer
- Phil Collins – composer
- Keith Crouch – producer
- Sara Cumings – art direction, design
- LaShawn Daniels – composer
- Ginger Dettman – project assistant
- Malia Doss – project assistant
- Mike Engstrom – product manager
- Roger Erickson – cover photo, photography
- Alan Fletcher – project assistant
- David Foster – producer
- Annaliese Harmon – project assistant
- Dan Hersch – remastering
- Jacqueline Hilliard – composer
- Robin Hurley – project assistant
- Bill Inglot – remastering
- Fred Jerkins III – producer
- Rodney Jerkins – producer
- Kipper Jones – producer
- Quincy Jones – producer
- Johnny de Mairo – producer
- Jonathan Mannion – photography
- Mark McKenna – project assistant
- Sonja Norwood – management
- QDIII – producer
- Ray J – performer
- Guy Roche – producer
- Timbaland – producer
- Becky Wagner – project assistant
- Kanye West – producer
- Corey Williams – project assistant
- Steve Woolard – project assistant

== Charts ==
Weekly chart performance for The Best of Brandy
Chart (2005)	Peak position
Australian Albums (ARIA)	25
Australian Urban Albums (ARIA)	5
European Top 100 Albums (Billboard)	92
Japanese Albums (Oricon)	28
Scottish Albums (Official Charts)	68
UK Albums (Official Charts)	24
UK R&B Albums (Official Charts)	14
US Billboard 200	27
US Top R&B/Hip-Hop Albums (Billboard)	11

== Certifications ==
Certifications and sales for The Best of Brandy
Region	Certification	Certified units/sales
United Kingdom (BPI)	Gold	100,000^{‡}
^{‡} Sales+streaming figures based on certification alone.

== Release history ==
Release dates and formats for The Best of Brandy
Region	Date	Format(s)	Label(s)	Ref.
Germany	April 4, 2005	CD; digital download	Warner Music	
United Kingdom	April 4, 2005	CD; digital download	Atlantic	
Canada	April 5, 2005	CD; digital download	Warner Music	
United States	April 5, 2005	CD; digital download	Atlantic	
France	April 12, 2005	CD; digital download	Warner Music	
Japan	April 27, 2005	CD; digital download	Warner Music	
Australia	May 2, 2005	CD; digital download	Warner Music	
Various	February 11, 2022	Black History Month edition vinyl; limited numbered edition vinyl	Atlantic	
