= Turn It Up (Brandy song) =

Song by Brandy

from the album Afrodisiac
- Released: November 2003
- Recorded: 2003
- Studio: Hit Factory Criteria (Miami)
- Genre: R&B; bounce
- Length: 4:12
- Label: Atlantic
- Songwriter(s): Walter Millsap III; Timothy Mosley; Candice Nelson
- Producer(s): Timbaland

"Turn It Up" is a song by American singer Brandy Norwood from her fourth studio album, Afrodisiac (2004). It was written by Timbaland along with protégé Walter Millsap III and Candice Nelson, while production was helmed by the former. The song was recorded at the Hit Factory Criteria and mixed by Jimmy Douglass in Miami, Florida. An uptempo R&B song, which also contains elements of rap, bounce music, and old school hip hop, the track serves as musical tribute to the early 1990s. Built on a pounding drum pattern and Timbaland's beatboxing, in "Turn It Up", Norwood expresses her desire to collaborate with the producer on a nostalgic club banger to assume her position atop the game.

"Turn It Up" was generally well received by contemporary music critics who highlighted Timbaland's production and the song's energetic nature. The first song that Nelson and her team wrote from the Afrodisiac sessions, it also was the first song from the project to be leaked prior to the album's official release in June 2004. Released as a buzz track in promotion of the upcoming album, it received an vinyl release in fall 2003. Although the song was not released commercially, it reached number two on the German Black Charts.

== Background ==
"Turn It Up" was produced by Timbaland, and written by the latter, frequent co-producer Walter Millsap III and Candice Nelson. The song is an homage to the early 1990s with references to Donnie Simpson's Video Soul, Kid n' Play, their 1990 film House Party and Tony! Toni! Toné!'s 1996 studio album House of Music. The line "'Cause I don't wanna sound familiar, want a guaranteed single, not an album filler" levels indirect criticism at former main producer Rodney Jerkins.

== Critical reception ==
Terry Sawyers from PopMatters commented that with "Turn It Up" Norwood "doesn’t completely drop the club thumpers, laying down “Turn It Up”, with drums that trip over themselves and alternate their pace while Brandy breathing in to keep the pace bumping." He added that while "Brandy’s voice isn’t exactly a barn burner, it’s not mentioned enough that she does more than enough with what she’s got. She never leaves her voice hanging in spotlit scarcity." David Browne of Entertainment Weekly declared that track a "superior dance number", which "should have Janet Jackson second-guessing her last album." Stylus Magazine's Josh Love called the song "one of the album’s best and brightest cuts" on Afrodisiac. He remarked that it "finds Brandy waxing nostalgic for Kid 'N Play's House Party, of all things."

Kitty Empire, writing for The Observer, wrote that "Turn It Up" was "a surefire party tune that hangs on a thoroughly ridiculous hook: Timbaland singing 'Noo noo noo'." Keya Modessa of The Situation wrote that "perhaps the only track, which seems little out of place, is "Turn It Up" and that is only because it's slightly more energetic than the rest of the album." Slant Magazine's Sal Cinquemani ranked "Turn It Up" along with "Afrodisiac" and "Should I Go" as album highlights on Afrodisiac.

== Track listings ==
- Promotional 12-inch single
1. "Turn It Up" (album version) – 4:12
2. "Turn It Up" (instrumental) – 4:12
3. "Turn It Up" (edited version) – 3:56
4. "Turn It Up" (a cappella) – 4:16
- Promotional CD single
1. "Turn It Up" (album version) – 4:12
2. "Turn It Up" (instrumental) – 4:12

== Credits and personnel ==
Credits are taken from Afrodisiac liner notes.

- Demacio "Demo" Castellón – engineer assistant
- Jimmy Douglass – engineer, mixing
- Blake English – engineer
- Chris Gehringher – mastering
- Walter Millsap III – additional vocals, songwriter
- Candice Nelson – songwriter
- Brandy Norwood – vocals, vocal producer
- Timbaland – additional vocals, mixing, producer, songwriter

== Charts ==
=== Weekly charts ===
Chart (2003–04)	Peak position
Germany (Deutsche Urban Charts)	2

=== Year-end charts ===
Chart (2004)	Rank
Germany (Deutsche Urban Charts)	22
