= Talk About Our Love =

2004 single by Brandy

Single by Brandy featuring Kanye West

from the album Afrodisiac
- B-side: "Turn It Up"; "Like It Was Yesterday"
- Released: March 26, 2004
- Studio: Record Plant (Los Angeles)
- Genre: R&B; hip hop
- Length: 3:34
- Label: Atlantic
- Songwriters: Claude Cave II; Harold Lilly; Kanye West; Carlos Wilson; Louis Wilson; Ricardo Wilson
- Producer: Kanye West

Brandy singles chronology
"He Is" (2002)	"Talk About Our Love" (2004)	"Who Is She 2 U" (2004)

Kanye West singles chronology
"Selfish" (2004)	"Talk About Our Love" (2004)	"This Way" (2004)

Audio video
- "Talk About Our Love" on YouTube

"Talk About Our Love" is a song recorded by American singer Brandy for her fourth studio album Afrodisiac (2004). It was written by Kanye West, who also appears as a featured artist on it, and Harold Lilly, while production was handled by the former. Due to the song's use of a sample of Mandrill's 1978 song "Gilly Hines", band members Claude Cave II, and Carlos, Louis, and Ricardo Wilson are also credited as writers. Lyrically, "Talk About Our Love" is about a relationship lacking support from family and friends.

Recorded late into the production of Afrodisiac, "Talk About Our Love" was an eleventh-hour addition to the track listing, alongside "Where You Wanna Be". It was eventually selected as the album's lead single in a last-minute decision, replacing the Timbaland-produced song "Black Pepper", which resulted in his dissociation from Afrodisiac. Released on March 26, 2004, to generally positive reviews from music critics, "Talk About Our Love" became a moderate commercial success. While it peaked at number six on the UK Singles Chart, the song peaked only at number 36 on the US Billboard Hot 100.

The accompanying music video for "Talk About Our Love" was directed by Dave Meyers and was based on a concept by West. It portrays Norwood and the rapper as a couple who is frequently disturbed by nosy friends and neighbours, who keep on popping in and out of their house to find out about their affairs. At the 2004 MTV Video Music Awards, Norwood garnered a nomination in the Best R&B Video category. Additionally, the song received a Best Collaboration nomination at the 2004 MOBO Awards. "Talk About Our Love" was promoted on several television shows and was later included in the encore set of her Human World Tour (2009).

== Writing and recording ==
"Talk About Our Love" was written by American rapper Kanye West and songwriter Harold Lilly, with production handled by the former. Due to the interpolation of Mandrill's 1978 song "Gilly Hines", band members Claude Cave II, and Carlos, Louis and Ricardo Wilson received co-writing credits on the track. Recorded by Eugene Toale at the Record Plant in Los Angeles, it was mixed by Manny Marroquin and engineered by Jun Isheseki, with further assistance from Blake English and Kenisha Pratt. Israeli musician Miri Ben-Ari played the violin, while Ervin A. Pope was on the keyboards.

An eleventh-hour addition to the final track listing of Afrodisiac, "Talk About Our Love" was not recorded until late into the production of the album. Although Norwood had considered the project complete by October 2003 after intense recording sessions with producer Timbaland and his team, Atlantic Records executive Geroid Roberson encouraged her to embark on additional studio sessions with West, following the success of his debut studio album The College Dropout (2004). "One of the executive producers of my album [Roberson] is one of Kanye's managers, so that's how we hooked up", Norwood explained the following year, adding: "He said he always wanted to work with me [and] having followed his successes, I've always wanted to work with him. When we got together it was like, 'Oh, my God! This is great chemistry. It's magical. Kanye's passionate about the song, and so am I, so it worked out great'!".

== Music and lyrics ==
"Talk About Our Love" is an R&B and hip hop song containing a sample from Mandrill's 1978 song "Gilly Hines". Borrowing from Kanye West's own sound at the time, including wordplay and sampling, Norwood compared the song to Alicia Keys' "You Don't Know My Name" (2003), another West production. Commenting on the music, Norwood said: "We [Norwood and West] collaborated and we just came up with a great melody".

Lyrically, "Talk About Our Love" revolves around a relationship that lacks support by family and friends. Speaking of the content, Norwood remarked: "For me, [it's about] when you're in a relationship and you just wanna be one with that person and you want everybody to support you, but they don't." She described the song as being about "being in a relationship being so deeply in love that everybody wants to be in your business. Everybody wants to be opinionated about what you do and why you do it and I think everybody in a relationship experiences that kind of stuff, people talking about your business so that is what that song is about."

== Release ==
Though Norwood was expected to shoot a music video for a Timbaland-produced "hyper, bass-heavy" track entitled "Black Pepper" during the second week of December 2003, plans for the single eventually fell through in favor of additional recording sessions with West, the result of which was "Talk About Our Love". Released as lead single from Afrodisiac by Atlantic Records heads, the decision somewhat contrasted with Timbaland's major influence on the album and resulted in his dissociation from the album. Norwood later voiced her discontent towards her record company bosses for subsequently deciding to release it as the album's lead single. "No offense, but ‘Talk About Our Love’ was never really my choice to come out with," she said. "I had created a creative energy and a creative bond with Timbaland. What we were trying to do for the album, it was a completely different sound than 'Talk About Our Love.' It was just a little bit interesting for me, and I just wanted to keep the same consistency. But also, Kanye was hot at the time and I wanted to work with him too, but for me it was really what I was trying to create a creative bond with Timbaland. So that wasn't my choice to come out with that first."

"Talk About Our Love" made its world premiere on March 26, 2004, via AOL Music's First Listen program, where it was streamed more than 4.6 million times within its first two-month of release; by March 28, its final version had leaked. The song's CD single was released in the United States on May 25, including a reworked version of "Turn It Up", Afrodisiac's preceding buzz single. Elsewhere, "Like It Was Yesterday" appeared as the B-side on the CD single. On July 13, a maxi CD single was released, featuring previously unreleased mixes of the original version; remixes were produced by Albert Cabrera, Bill Hamel, Eric "E-Smoove" Miller, That Kid Chris, Lawrence Fordyce, Eric "Thick Dick" Miller and D. Brandon under his Alan Smithee pseudonym.

== Critical reception ==
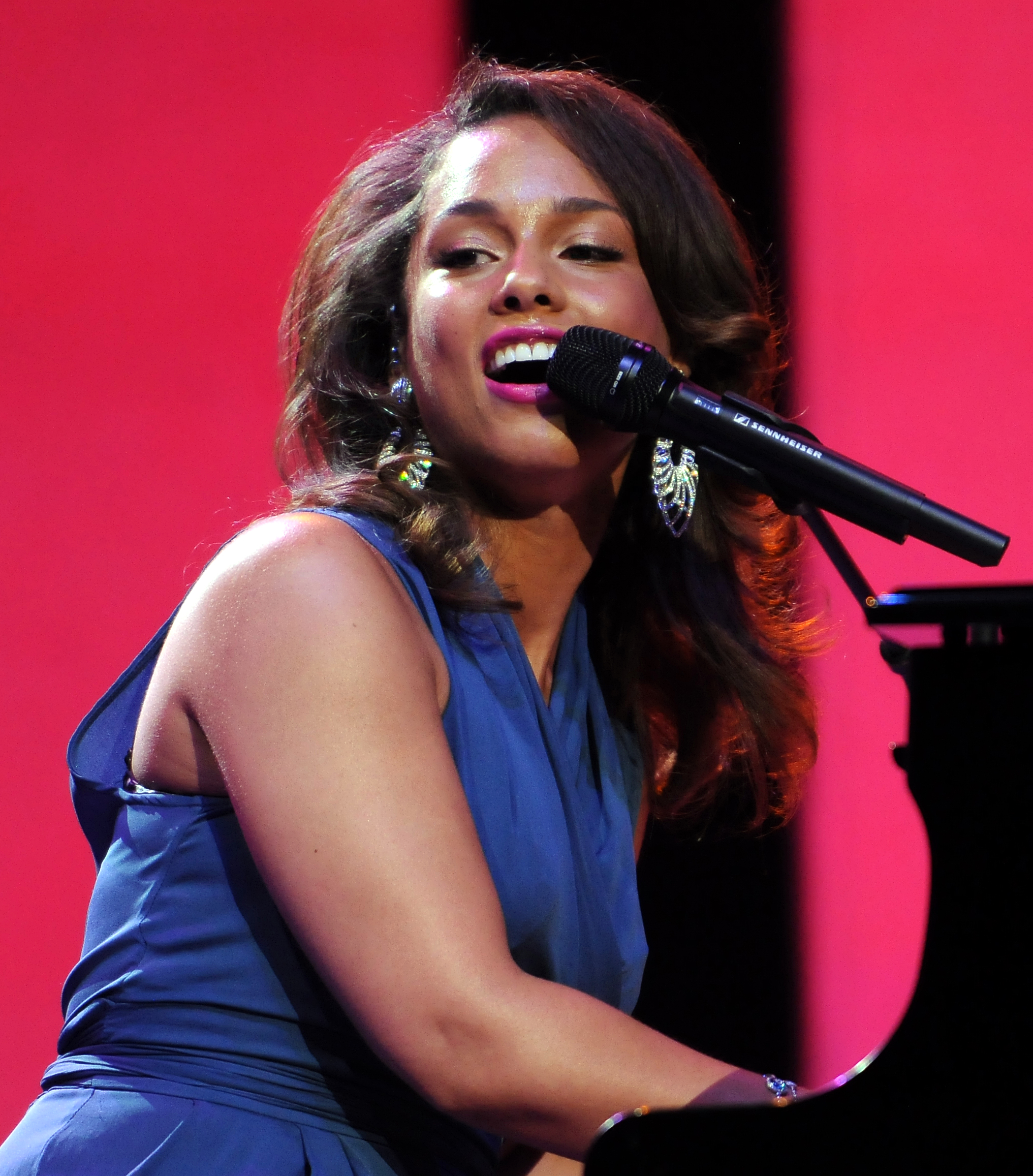
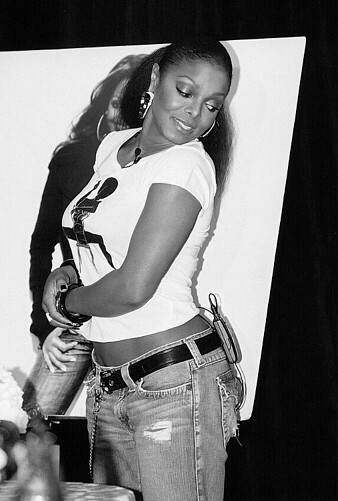
Critics compared the record to Alicia Keys' "You Don't Know My Name" and Janet Jackson "I Want You", both of which West had also contributed to.

"Talk About Our Love" garnered a generally positive response from music critics. In his review of Afrodisiac for AllMusic, Andy Kellman noted that "Talk About Our Love" was a "career highlight for both producer and vocalist" and that it was "even more exceptional than another recent Kanye West-produced track, Janet Jackson's own "I Want You"." In his review for Billboard, Michael Paoletta wrote that "now armed with a new single, Brandy sounds more grown up and confident (echoes of Mary J. Blige abound). At times, this Kanye West production sound like a lost Shalamar track. In this way, "Talk About Our Love" also recalls Alicia Keys' "You Don't Know My Name", which West co-produced [...] Breezy and melodic, the song intertwines disco-era orchestration and electro-hued hip hop".

Music Week felt the song was "boasting great production and a strong hook" and that "it should chart effortlessly." In her review of Afrodisiac, Sharon O'Connell of Yahoo! Music called West's productions the "two killer tracks" on the album. Vibe found that "Talk About Our Love" would aim at Norwood's core audience, stating that "Brandy comes out of the gate with a bangin' Kanye West-produced single [and] this mid-tempo jam is sure to gain the love of many fans that might have been wary of Brandy's recent projects. Watch out Beyoncé and Ashanti – Brandy's back!" BBC Music rated the song three out of five stars, writing: "The chorus is catchy and memorable, so you'll be humming that, but you might not remember how the verses go [...] It'll probably chart somewhere in the teens. It's a good song but does take a few listening before you get into it."

== Commercial performance ==
On May 6, 2004, "Talk About Our Love" debuted at number 88 on the US Billboard Hot 100, being the sixth highest debut of the week. The song peaked at number 36 on June 3, the same week it earned the Billboard Hot 100's greatest retail gainer designation, becoming Norwood's lowest-peaking lead single at the time. Furthermore, it became her first single to fail reaching the top 20 since "U Don't Know Me (Like U Used To)" (1999) peaked at number 72. "Talk About Our Love" was more successful on Billboard's component charts, reaching the top 20 on the Dance Club Play and Hot R&B/Hip-Hop Singles & Tracks charts. The maxi-CD single also peaked at number two on the Dance Singles Sales chart.

In the United Kingdom, "Talk About Our Love" debuted and peaked at number six on the UK Singles Chart, becoming Norwood's fifth non-consecutive top-ten single. The song was the second-highest entry of the week and remained within the top ten for two weeks. Elsewhere, the song reached the top 40 in Australia, Ireland, Italy, and the Netherlands.

== Music video ==
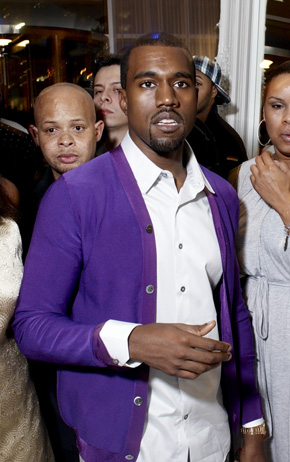
The plot of the video was based on a treatment by West.

The accompanying music video for "Talk About Our Love" was filmed in Los Angeles between April 13–14, 2004 and was produced by Rick Revel for Radical Media Inc. It was Norwood's third video to be directed by Dave Meyers, who had previously worked with her on the videos for "Another Day in Paradise" (2001) and "What About Us?" (2002). Apart from Kanye West, who came up with the concept for the video, Norwood's younger brother Ray J and actress Maia Campbell make cameo appearances in the video. West later revealed he met and attained affection for his later-wife Kim Kardashian, who was Brandy's assistant at the timen while filming.

The concept of the video was influenced by Norwood's personal experiences at that period, picking up the idea of nosy friends and neighbors, who keep on popping in and out of her house to find out about her affairs. Opening with a musical intro, the first scene in the video begins with Norwood confronting West, who's standing behind the kitchen's table, when other people switch constantly in and out the room and watch what's happening. The camera follows West's fleeing steps through the floor, incessantly backspacing on Norwood, who runs after him. The scene shifts into the living-room, where it changes into a sequence with two male dancers, before Norwood leaves the room to take stairs into the bedroom. West follows and sings to her next on the bed, when once again pop strangers in the room and Norwood and Kanye decide to escape out of the house. The video ends with both singers sitting in an oldtimer and driving down the street.

The video premiered on May 2, 2004, at the end of its Making the Video episode on MTV and entered general rotation on the network the following day. It debuted on Total Request Live on May 10 and on MuchMusic in Canada the week ending May 16. It reached number three on the TRL top ten video countdown on May 21, after a week on the countdown; and retired from the show after spending 13 days on the countdown. The "Talk About Our Love" video was the most-played clip on BET, reaching number two on the network's video countdown 106 & Park. PopMatters ranked the video among the best music videos of 2004. At the 2004 MTV Video Music Awards, Norwood and West were nominated in the category of Best R&B Video for "Talk About Our Love".

== Track listings and formats ==
International maxi CD single
No.	Title	Writer(s)	Producer(s)	Length
1.	"Talk About Our Love" (Album Version)	Harold Lilly; Kanye West; Claude Cave II; Carlos Wilson; Louis Wilson; Ricardo Wilson	West; Kenisha Pratt^{[a]}	3:39
2.	"Talk About Our Love" (One Rascal Remix)	Lilly; West; Cave; C. Wilson; L. Wilson; R. Wilson	West; Brandy Norwood^{[a]}; Albert Cabrera^{[b]}	6:00
3.	"Like It Was Yesterday"	Michael Flowers	Mike City	3:53

UK CD single
No.	Title	Writer(s)	Producer(s)	Length
1.	"Talk About Our Love" (Album Version)	Lilly; West; Cave; C. Wilson; L. Wilson; R. Wilson	West; Norwood^{[a]}	3:39
2.	"Talk About Our Love" (One Rascal Remix)	Lilly; West; Cave; C. Wilson; L. Wilson; R. Wilson	West; Norwood^{[a]}; Cabrera^{[b]}	6:00

US CD single
No.	Title	Writer(s)	Producer(s)	Length
1.	"Talk About Our Love" (Album Version)	Lilly; West; Cave; C. Wilson; L. Wilson; R. Wilson	West; Norwood^{[a]}	3:39
2.	"Turn It Up" (Edited Version)	Walter Millsap III; Candice Nelson; Timothy Mosley	Timbaland; Norwood^{[a]}	3:53

US maxi CD single
No.	Title	Writer(s)	Producer(s)	Length
1.	"Talk About Our Love" (Extended Mix)	Lilly; West; Cave; C. Wilson; L. Wilson; R. Wilson	West; Norwood^{[a]}	4:57
2.	"Talk About Our Love" (One Rascal Remix)	Lilly; West; Cave; C. Wilson; L. Wilson; R. Wilson	West; Norwood^{[a]}; Albert Cabrera^{[b]}	6:00
3.	"Talk About Our Love" (Bill Hamel Club Mix)	Lilly; West; Cave; C. Wilson; L. Wilson; R. Wilson	West; Norwood^{[a]}; Bill Hamel^{[b]}	7:13
4.	"Talk About Our Love" (E-Smoove Classic Club Mix)	Lilly; West; Cave; C. Wilson; L. Wilson; R. Wilson	West; Norwood^{[a]}; E-Smoove^{[b]}	7:14
5.	"Talk About Our Love" (Ford Trance Mix)	Lilly; West; Cave; C. Wilson; L. Wilson; R. Wilson	West; Norwood^{[a]}; Frederick "Ford" Fordyce^{[b]}	7:39
6.	"Talk About Our Love" (Alan Smithee in Blueblackness Mix)	Lilly; West; Cave; C. Wilson; L. Wilson; R. Wilson	West; Norwood^{[a]}; Smithee^{[b]}	9:59
7.	"Talk About Our Love" (TKC Club Mix)	Lilly; West; Cave; C. Wilson; L. Wilson; R. Wilson	West; Norwood^{[a]}; TKC^{[b]}	7:59
8.	"Talk About Our Love" (Ford House Mix)	Lilly; West; Cave; C. Wilson; L. Wilson; R. Wilson	West; Norwood^{[a]}; Ford^{[b]}	6:38
9.	"Talk About Our Love" (Bill Hamel Clubbed Up Dub Mix)	Lilly; West; Cave; C. Wilson; L. Wilson; R. Wilson	West; Norwood^{[a]}; Hamel ^{[b]}	8:58
10.	"Talk About Our Love" (Thick Dick Dub)	Lilly; West; Cave; C. Wilson; L. Wilson; R. Wilson	West; Norwood^{[a]}; Thick Dick^{[b]}	8:03

Notes

- ^{^a} denotes vocal producer
- ^{^b} denotes additional producer

== Credits and personnel ==
Credits are adapted from the liner notes of Afrodisiac.

- Miri Ben-Ari – violin
- Claude Cave II – writing
- Albert Cabrera – production
- Blake English – engineering assistance
- Brian Gardner – mastering
- Keenan "Keynote" Holloway – bass
- Jun Isheseki – engineering
- Glenn S. Jeffrey – guitar
- Harold Lilly – writing
- Manny Marroquin – mixing
- Brandy Norwood – vocals, vocal production
- Ervin A. Pope – keyboards
- Kenisha Pratt – engineering assistance, vocal production
- Kanye West – vocals, production, writing
- Carlos Wilson – writing
- Louis Wilson – writing
- Ricardo Wilson – writing

== Charts ==
=== Weekly charts ===
Weekly chart performance for "Talk About Our Love"
Chart (2004)	Peak position
Australia (ARIA)	28
Belgium (Ultratip Bubbling Under Flanders)	11
Belgium (Ultratip Bubbling Under Wallonia)	10
European Hot 100 Singles (Billboard)	18
Germany (GfK)	89
Ireland (IRMA)	27
Italy (FIMI)	36
Netherlands (Dutch Top 40)	38
Netherlands (Single Top 100)	25
Scottish Singles Sales (Official Charts)	21
Switzerland (Schweizer Hitparade)	42
UK Singles (Official Charts)	6
UK Hip Hop/R&B (Official Charts)	3
US Billboard Hot 100	36
US Dance Club Songs (Billboard)	13
US Dance Singles Sales (Billboard)	2
US Hot R&B/Hip-Hop Songs (Billboard)	16
US Rhythmic Airplay (Billboard)	32
US CHR/Pop Top 50 (Radio & Records)	49
US Urban (Radio & Records)	12

=== Year-end charts ===
Year-end chart performance for "Talk About Our Love"
Chart (2004)	Position
Germany (Deutsche Urban Charts)	37
UK Singles (OCC)	155
UK Urban (Music Week)	16
US Hot R&B/Hip-Hop Singles & Tracks (Billboard)	83

== Release history ==
Release dates and formats for "Talk About Our Love"
Region	Date	Format(s)	Label(s)	Ref.
United States	March 26, 2004	Streaming	Atlantic	
United States	April 27, 2004	12-inch vinyl	Atlantic	
United States	May 10, 2004	Rhythmic contemporary radio	Atlantic	
United States	May 10, 2004	Urban contemporary radio	Atlantic	
United States	May 25, 2004	CD	Atlantic	
Germany	June 4, 2004	Maxi CD	Warner Music	
Australia	June 14, 2004	Maxi CD	Warner Music	
Germany	June 14, 2004	12-inch vinyl	Warner Music	
United Kingdom	June 14, 2004	CD	Atlantic	
United States	June 14, 2004	Contemporary hit radio	Atlantic	
United States	July 13, 2004	Maxi CD	Atlantic	
