= 100 (The Game song) =

Single by The Game featuring Drake

from the album The Documentary 2
- Released: June 26, 2015
- Recorded: 2015
- Genre: Hip hop
- Length: 5:34
- Label: Blood Money; eOne
- Songwriters: Jayceon Taylor; Aubrey Graham; Johnny Juliano; Ronald LaTour
- Producers: Juliano; Cardo

The Game singles chronology
"Ryda" (2015)	"100" (2015)	"El Chapo" (2015)

Drake singles chronology
"Preach" (2015)	"100" (2015)	"R.I.C.O." (2015)

"100" is a song by American rapper The Game featuring Canadian rapper Drake. The song is the first single from The Game's sixth studio album, The Documentary 2. The song was premiered by DJ Envy on Power 105.1 on June 25, 2015. The title refers to speaking the truth, or "keeping it 100". The main theme of the song is how fame can erode trust among friends. It contains a sample of "Feel the Fire" by Peabo Bryson.

== Critical reception ==
Upon release, "100" received critical acclaim from music critics. Rap-Up called the beat "soulful", and added that Drake "holds down the hook". Zach Rydenlund of Complex noted that the song is "a bit slower", but "has the potential to be a hit". Latifah Muhammad of BET wrote that the instrumental "definitely something special". Stereogum's Tom Breihan also gave a positive review to the song describing it as "warm" and "soulful".

== Commercial performance ==
Upon its radio release, "100" was the most added song on both urban contemporary and rhythmic contemporary radio of the week. The song peaked at number 82 on the Billboard Hot 100 and charted for 10 weeks. The song also peaked at number 25 on the Hot R&B/Hip-Hop Songs chart, remaining there for 18 weeks. "100" also received some chart success in Canada where it has peaked at number 63 on the Canadian Hot 100, making it Game's second highest-charting single on the chart after "My Life" which peaked at number 42 in 2008.

== Music video ==
The Game and Drake were already shooting the music video in Compton, California weeks before the song was released. The video premiered on Vevo on July 30, 2015.

== Track listing ==
- Digital download
1. "100" (explicit) (featuring Drake) – 5:43
2. "100" (clean) (featuring Drake) – 5:43
- Album version
1. "100" (featuring Drake) – 5:34

== Charts ==
Chart (2015)	Peak position
Canada Hot 100 (Billboard)	63
Germany (Deutsche Black Charts)	4
UK Hip Hop/R&B (Official Charts)	38
UK Singles (Official Charts)	179
US Billboard Hot 100	82
US Hot R&B/Hip-Hop Songs (Billboard)	25

== Certifications ==
Region	Certification	Certified units/sales
New Zealand (RMNZ)	Gold	15,000^{‡}
United States (RIAA)	Platinum	1,000,000^{‡}
^{‡} Sales+streaming figures based on certification alone.

== Release history ==
Region	Date	Format	Label
United States	June 23, 2015	Digital download	Blood Money; eOne
United States	July 14, 2015	Rhythmic contemporary radio	Blood Money; eOne
