= Afrodisiac (Brandy album) =

2004 studio album by Brandy

Studio album by Brandy
- Released: June 25, 2004
- Recorded: 2002–2004
- Studios: Ameraycan; Conjunction Productions; Corner Store; Larrabee North; Paramount; Record Plant (Los Angeles); Sony; The Studio (Philadelphia); Dungeon (Atlanta); Hit Factory Criteria (Miami)
- Genres: R&B; progressive soul
- Length: 61:19
- Label: Atlantic
- Producers: Brandy Norwood; Warryn "Baby Dubb" Campbell; Big Chuck; Theron Feemster; Walter Millsap III; Organized Noise; Timbaland; Kanye West

Brandy chronology
Full Moon (2002)	Afrodisiac (2004)	The Best of Brandy (2005)

Singles from Afrodisiac
- 1. "Talk About Our Love" Released: March 28, 2004; 2. "Who Is She 2 U" Released: July 27, 2004; 3. "Afrodisiac" Released: September 24, 2004

Afrodisiac is the fourth studio album by American singer Brandy. It was first released on June 25, 2004, by Atlantic Records. The album was recorded primarily in Los Angeles between spring 2003 and early 2004, following several major changes in Brandy's personal and professional life. After giving birth to her daughter and the demise of her relationship with Big Bert, Brandy's team was given an overhaul, including changes in production, management, and A&R. The album marked a departure from her previous work, with Brandy collaborating with producer Timbaland and songwriters Candice Nelson and Walter Millsap III on the majority of the album's composition.

With many of their new relationships being the result of broken ones, Brandy and Timbaland were inspired to experiment with a number of sounds and influences to create a unique, individualized sound that was distinct from other R&B music. The result was an organic, mellow contemporary R&B album that experimented with the New York-based illbient style, which infuses eccentric hip-hop breakbeats, ambient soundscapes, and the unorthodox sampling of indie rock and various film scores. Norwood also continued to experiment with her singing, opting to use more technical applications of counterpoint and multi-track recording toward her vocal arrangements. An autobiographical album, the songs feature intimate lyrics which discuss the singer's personal struggles with codependency, monogamy, misplaced loyalty, and professional anxiety.

Upon release, Afrodisiac was critically acclaimed for its mature lyrics, Brandy's vocalizing, and its overall experimental sound. The album debuted at number three on the US Billboard 200, selling 131,700 copies in its first week; it was eventually certified gold by the Recording Industry Association of America (RIAA). Afrodisiac was nominated for several awards, including the Grammy Award for Best Contemporary R&B Album. The album spawned three singles, including "Talk About Our Love" featuring Kanye West, which reached the top 40 on the Billboard Hot 100; along with "Who Is She 2 U" and "Afrodisiac". Since its release, the album has been retrospectively called a predecessor to alternative R&B, having been cited as an influence by artists such as Rihanna and Solange.

== Background ==
In February 2002, Brandy released her third studio album Full Moon, which was preceded by the lead single "What About Us?", a worldwide top-ten hit. However, the album's title track failed to chart or sell noticeably outside the United States and the United Kingdom, where it managed to enter the top twenty. During the production of Full Moon, she became involved romantically with producer Robert "Big Bert" Smith. The couple began a relationship during the summer of 2001, but their relationship did not become known until February 2002, the same month Brandy revealed that she was expecting her first child. However, a year after the birth of their daughter Sy'rai Iman Smith on June 16, 2002, Brandy and Smith officially announced their separation. It was not until 2004 that Smith revealed that the pair had never been legally wed, but that they had only portrayed the notion of nuptials to preserve the singer's public image. By the following year, Brandy had begun a relationship with NBA guard Quentin Richardson. The couple soon became engaged in July 2004 but she eventually ended their 15-month engagement in October 2005.

== Recording and production ==
Only weeks after giving birth to her daughter, Brandy entered recording studios to begin work on her then-untitled fourth album with producer Mike City and the child's father, Robert "Big Bert" Smith. Following a fallout with longtime collaborator Rodney "Darkchild" Jerkins, whom she felt had begun repurposing the distinctive sound they developed on Never Say Never for other artists, while also withholding material she considered commercially strong, Smith assumed the role of executive producer and A&R, effectively replacing Jerkins and his Darkchild team, who had contributed extensively to her previous two albums. Eager to redefine her artistic direction and expand her creative range amid a broader shift in radio toward a more urban sound, Brandy and Smith envisioned a project that was "rawer" and more "street"-oriented than its 2002 predecessor Full Moon, with Brandy seeking a more active role in the songwriting process. By late November 2002, the pair had completed several demo recordings and at least four fully realized tracks, including "Ryde or Die" and Sy'rai-inspired "Sunshine," but although Smith at one point anticipated a spring 2003 release, the couple ended their relationship in mid-2003, resulting in delays to the project and significant changes in its creative personnel.

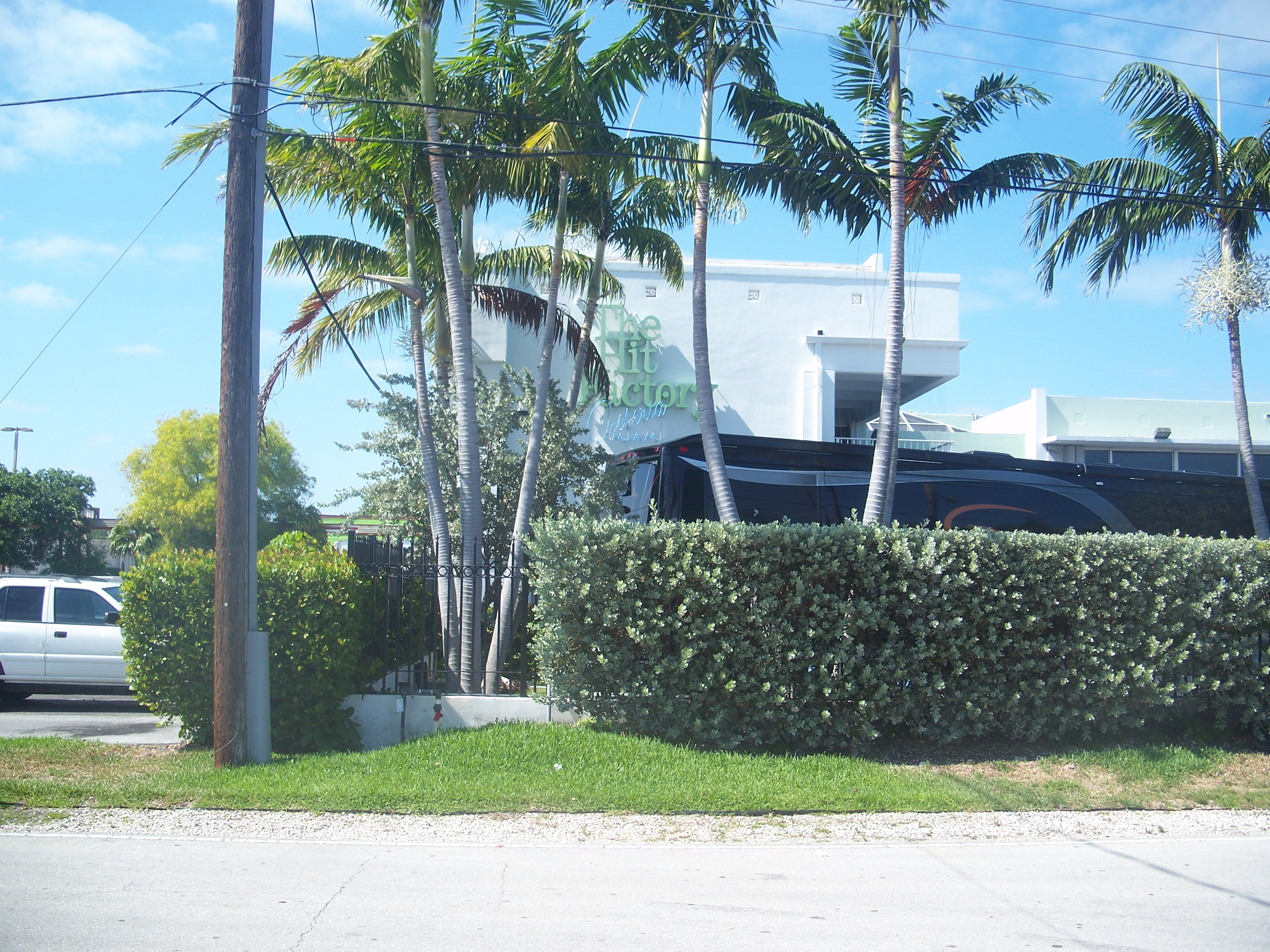
The Hit Factory Criteria in Miami, Florida, where most tracks on Afrodisiac were recorded.

Brandy ultimately chose to scrap much of the material recorded during these sessions and instead enlisted Timbaland, who had been attached to the project as a contributor and with whom the couple had previously collaborated on Kiley Dean's debut album Simpe Girl, as one of the album's primary creative forces. Although the two had been friends for several years, they had not previously collaborated. Impressed by his vision for the project, Brandy later noted that the collaboration helped her rediscover a sense of musical passion she felt had been overshadowed by the technical emphasis of Full Moon. She described the shift as a deliberate effort to evolve artistically, explore her versatility, and experiment with a new sonic identity, resulting in what she characterized as a more "edgy" and "sassy" sound while retaining emotional depth. With the help of Timbaland protégés such as Candice Nelson, Steve "Static" Garrett, and co-producer Walter Millsap III the pair worked on what was tentatively titled B-Rocka—a nickname actually given to her by Jerkins—and originally planned for a Christmas 2003 release. Their first collaboration, 1990s tribute "Turn It Up," was leaked onto the internet in autumn 2003, and soon released as a promotional buzz track.

Having concluded additional recording sessions with Warryn Campbell, Theron Feemster and Organized Noise, in November 2003, Atlantic Records announced that Brandy was putting the finishing touches on her still-untitled album, at that time scheduled for a release on March 2, 2004, and she would shoot a music video for the "hyper, bass-heavy" banger "Black Pepper" during the second week of December. However, plans for the single were later abandoned, as the Timbaland-produced track was scrapped in favor of a new song, "Talk About Our Love," produced by rapper Kanye West. Both the single and album cut "Where You Wanna Be" were eleventh-hour additions to the album, following encouragement from West's manager, Geroid Roberson, one of the executive producers on Afrodisiac, for Brandy to undertake additional studio sessions with West. Brandy was initially unaware that Atlantic had offered West two placements on the album with the stipulation that one of his tracks would serve as the lead single, a decision made without her consultation and one that significantly altered her original vision for the project. On their collaboration, she commented: "Kanye put the finishing touches on the record. The two tracks we did were just what I needed to tie the whole thing together."

== Music and lyrics ==
"It's about passion. It's romantic, and that's where I am in my life right now," Brandy noted during promotional touring in 2004, a time when she was engaged to New York Knicks guard Quentin Richardson. "I'm not trying to be edgy, sassy, romantic, vulnerable or whatever emotions come across, I really am all that", she said. While not a concept record, Afrodisiac features several consistent motifs throughout. It contains several lyrical references to 1990s hip hop and R&B culture figures, including Brandy herself, Timbaland and longtime partner Missy Elliott, her peers Aaliyah and Monica, American music video program Video Soul and its host Donnie Simpson, hip-hop group Kid n' Play and their 1990 film House Party, sketch comedy television series In Living Color, and Tony! Toni! Toné!'s studio album House of Music (1996). Throughout the album, English rock band Coldplay is used in both lyrical and musical concepts. In a 2013 interview, songwriter Candice Nelson discussed that coincidentally, she, Timbaland, and Brandy had all been privately listening to Coldplay's studio album Parachutes (2000).

"On Afrodisiac, you really get to know me as a person and I'm not sugarcoating any of the lyrics. My fans will be able to connect to it because they'll know exactly what I've been through."

— Brandy Norwood on Afrodisiac.

The general theme of anxiety runs through majority of the songs, with a lyrical focus on being critical of close personal and long-term professional relationships. She references her relationship with Robert Smith ("Who I Am", "I Tried", "Focus"), then-fiancé Quentin Richardson ("Where You Wanna Be", "Say You Will"), friends ("Sadiddy"), family ("Necessary"), career ("Should I Go"), and herself ("Come As You Are", "Finally"). The line "'Cause I don't wanna sound familiar, want a guaranteed single, not an album filler" from "Turn It Up" levels indirect criticism at creative differences with former main producer Jerkins and Atlantic Records staff. On ending track "Should I Go," which interpolates Coldplay's "Clocks", she openly talks about contemplating stepping away from the music business, admitting that she's trying to figure out where she fits in today.

Although Brandy received a sole writing credit on album cut "Finally" only, she noted Afrodisiac the most honest effort of her career yet based on its deeply autobiographical content, commenting: "Everything I do has something to do with what I've gone through in my life [and] I definitely wanted to incorporate that in my art. It makes it more real when you add what's been going on in your life in your music. I've grown and I've gone through some things in my life, and I celebrate that, I honor that." Songwriter Nelson spoke further, saying, "[throughout this album] my thought was 'what's going on in her mind?' I wanted to observe her more than talk to her. First of all, I was starstruck, so I wanted to just watch her, and write from that. She was kind of shocked by what I would write. [Then] I was amazed, because she would take what I wrote and make this rainbow of sounds. She's so brilliant." Soundwise, her collaborator Timbaland spoke of their work on the album in his memoir The Emperor of Sound (2015). In the book, he says: "I always wanted to work with Brandy. She sings like a hummingbird," adding: "She really trusted me and wanted to do whatever I wanted to do. I make something and then play it for her, and she'd go crazy. Then she'd go arrange her vocals and play it for me, and I'd go crazy. That's how we worked."

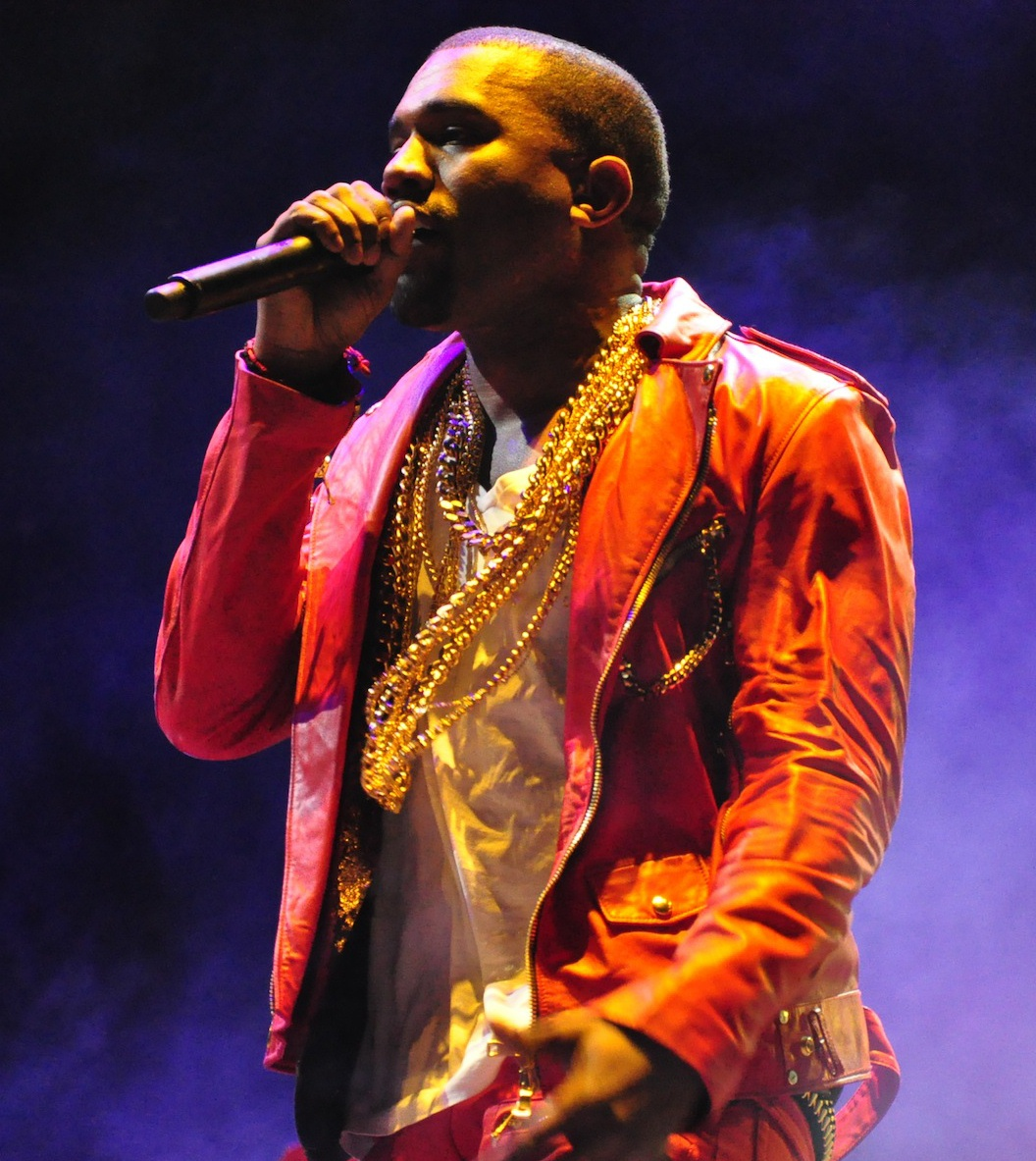
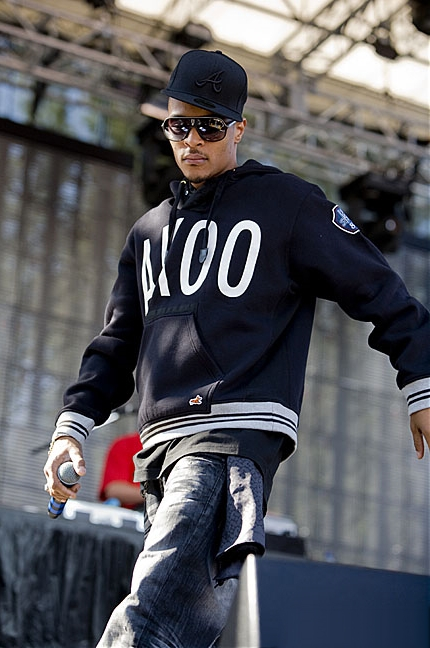
Producer Kanye West (left) and rapper T.I. were two of the featured artists on the album.

Opening track "Who I Am", the album's only contribution by Warryn "Baby Dubb" Campbell, was an eleventh-hour addition to the album's final track listing. Built around a pirouetting keyboard melody, the song discusses Brandy's rocky relationship with Smith as well as her public image in open letter form. Second track "Afrodisiac", the album's title track and second international single, was generally well received by critics, and enjoyed moderate success throughout Asia and Europe. Depicting a woman's aphrodisiac affection with a man, it combines elements of pop and dance music, incorporating elements of fellow Timbaland-production "Are You That Somebody?" as performed by Aaliyah. Brandy has declared the song her favorite cut on the record. Alongside "Afrodisiac", third track "Who Is She 2 U" was one of the first songs the singer worked on with Timbaland and his crew. Based around true events, the song describes a woman who is suspicious about her mate's awkward behavior around a seemingly unfamiliar woman. The dramatic up-tempo incorporates chamber pop string melodies and go-go drum programming. An unofficial but prominent duet version of the track featuring vocals by fellow R&B singer Usher was released on various mixtapes in late 2004.

Lead single "Talk About Our Love", the result of additional recording sessions with rapper Kanye West and violinist Miri Ben-Ari, was not composed until late into the production of the album and describes the pressures of other people meddling into relationships. Iron Maiden-sampling "I Tried" is a downbeat midtempo track and ode to British heavy metal band Iron Maiden. It talks about the singer listening to Coldplay's song "Sparks" as she regrets playing the fool for an unfaithful ex-lover. Considered to be released as a single at times, it drew comparisons to Justin Timberlake's "Cry Me a River" in style and music. "Where You Wanna Be", another West production, features a bridge by rapper T.I. and deals with a woman's lover not getting his priorities in order as she is requesting him to make a decision between his friends, his career choices, and her. Brandy chronicles her ups and downs on mid-tempo track "Focus," the album's seventh track, on which she struggles not to let an old habit back in her life. The "ambient soul" song, which Brandy ranked among her favorite tracks on the album, consists of stuttering synths and instrumentation from heavy bass and an electric guitar. Eight track "Sadiddy" is built around a hand-clap-laden synth beat and one of the few up-tempo tracks on the album. It talks about Brandy not being seddity and the consequences of going against her.

Ninth track "Turn It Up" is one of several songs that reference Aaliyah. A 1990s tribute cut that combines elements of old school hip hop with Timbaland's beatboxing instrumentals, the song was the first full-length release preceding the album as a promotional buzz track in fall 2003. Although the song was not released commercially, it appeared on several charts, reaching number two on the Deutsche Urban Charts in Germany. The tenth song, "Necessary", written by Cee Lo Green, discusses Brandy's desire for her hard work to matter to loved ones, and features a syncopated, skipping beat. Eleventh track, the soulful and minimalistic "Say You Will" saw a woman ready to settle down, and urging her mate to join her in a domestic life. "How I Feel", a serene, smoky ballad, features Brandy warning her mate that his busy life was slowly pushing her away. The song was blend of the adult-oriented urban pop of her former albums, and the more ambient, bluesy work she was dabbling with. "Should I Go", based upon Coldplay's song "Clocks", is built on percussive beats, syncopated handclaps and a piano riff. Lyrically, Brandy as the protagonist openly talks about contemplating stepping away from the music business, admitting that she's trying to figure out where she fits in today.

== Release and promotion ==
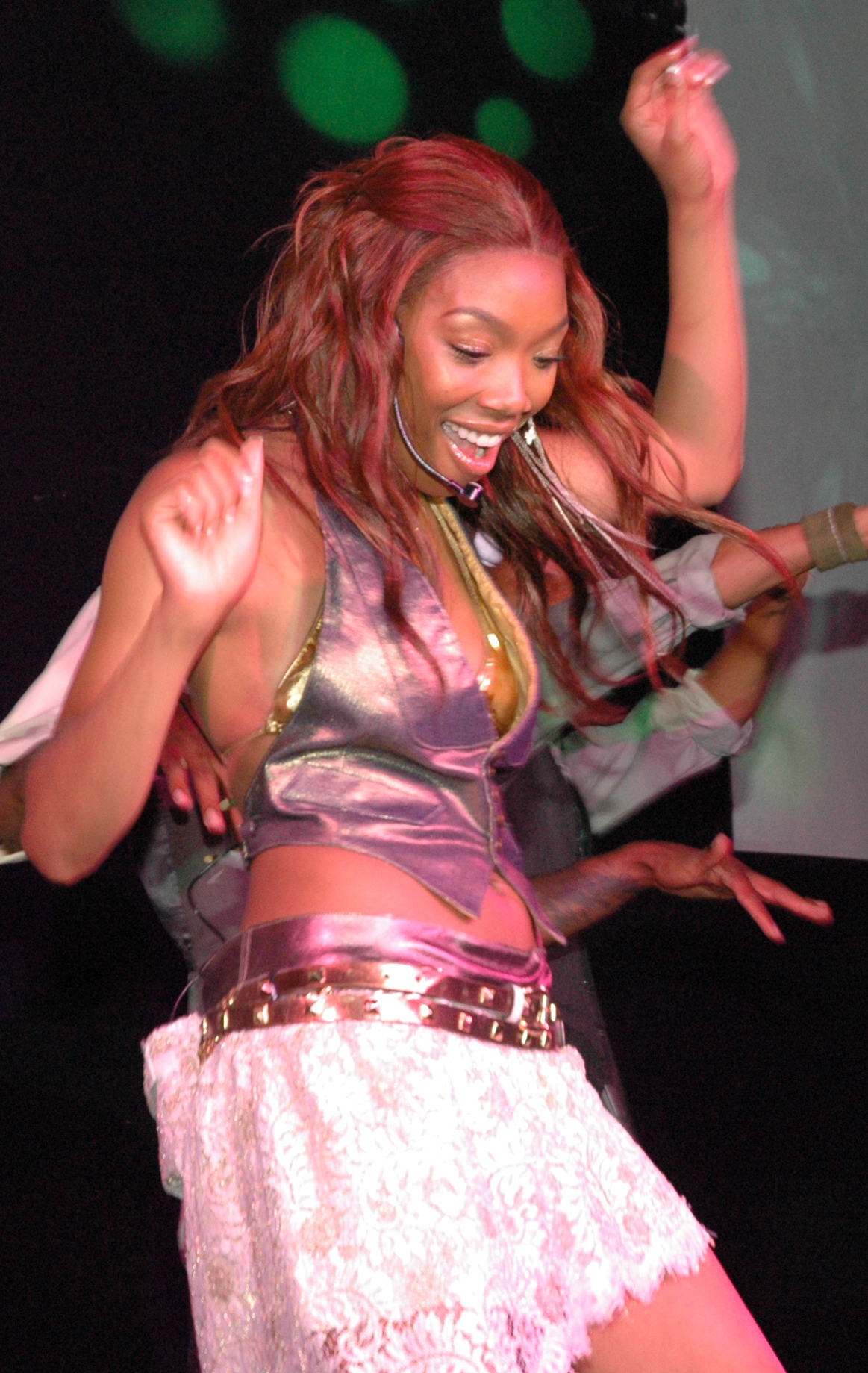
Brandy performing "Afrodisiac" in July 2004.

Afrodisiac was released in the United States on June 29, 2004, by Atlantic Records; its limited edition with three bonus tracks was released exclusively in France on October 18 by East West Records. Promotion for Afrodisiac first began with a massive media event in Montego Bay, Jamaica, where the album was previewed to a hand-picked list of journalists at a press launch held in the Royal Pavilion of the Half Moon Hotel. Promotional touring for the album started on May 23, 2004, with a series major national television appearances, highlighted by performances on The Tonight Show with Jay Leno on July 13, NBC's Today show as part of their outdoor Toyota Concert Series on July 16, and ABC's The View on July 19. Brandy also performed on both CBS's The Late Late Show and the syndicated On-Air with Ryan Seacrest on July 14. Outside the United States, she made appearances on Top of the Pops and Anke Late Night, where she performed a rendition of Whitney Houston's "One Moment in Time" in the form of a coffee commercial.

Additionally, Brandy was seen in a host of special programming airing on music television networks BET, MTV, VH1, and Fuse. The album's arrival in stores was celebrated with an appearance as a presenter at the 2004 BET Awards, preceded by a special live performance on 106 & Park. On July 1, she headed to New York City for appearances on MTV's TRL and Fuse's Daily Download. In addition, tracks from Afrodisiac were streamed over one million times via MTV.com's The Leak in the week preceding the album's release. Online, Brandy was introduced as the LAUNCHcast Artist of the Month for July 2004. The promotion included exclusive interviews and performances as well as contests to win live video chats with her. The "Talk About Our Love" online campaign kicked off with an AOL First Listen premiere, and Brandy was AOL's "Artist of the Month" for June 2004. Her Sessions@AOL performance debuted on the service in July.

== Singles ==
Excluding the buzz track "Turn It Up" released in November 2003, Afrodisiac produced three official singles. "Talk About Our Love" was released as the album's lead single on March 28, 2004. While the song was critically appreciated, it achieved limited commercial success worldwide—peaking only at number 36 on the US Billboard Hot 100— though managing to reach the top ten on the UK Singles Chart and the US Hot Singles Sales.

In North America, "Who Is She 2 U" was released as the album's second and final single. Suffering from low airplay, the song never made it out of the lower half of the Billboard Hot 100 and emerged as one of Brandy's lowest-charting singles, peaking at number 85. In March 2005, the song also received a limited release in Europe to promote the release of her first greatest hits album The Best of Brandy (2005), but failed to chart or sell noticeably, reaching only number 50 on the UK Singles Chart.

Outside the United States, the title track served as the album's second single. Released to greater success than "Talk About Our Love" in almost all the countries it was released in, the song reached number eleven in the United Kingdom and made it to top thirty in France and Ireland. Plans for a fourth single, including contender "I Tried", failed to materialize.

== Critical reception ==
Professional ratings
Aggregate scores
Source	Rating
Metacritic	73/100
Review scores
Source	Rating
AllMusic	4/5 stars
Blender	3/5 stars
Entertainment Weekly	A−
People	4/4 stars
PopMatters	7/10 stars
Rolling Stone	4/5 stars
Slant	4/5 stars
Stylus Magazine	B−
USA Today	3/4 stars
Yahoo! Music UK	6/10 stars

Afrodisiac became her best-received album at the time of its release, averaging 73 out of 100 among averaged reviews on Metacritic. Andy Kellman of AllMusic gave the album four out of five stars and praised it as "Brandy's fourth consecutive durable showing, [...] stocked with a number of spectacular—and emotionally resonant—singles that wind up making for her most accomplished set yet." David Browne of Entertainment Weekly gave the album an A− rating, calling it "Brandy's meatiest album to date," and ranked it sixth on his personal year-end top ten list. He found special approval for Timbaland, "who produced most of the disc, turns up the bass, the volume, and the tension whenever he can, bolstering her less-than-commanding, down-pillow-soft voice." Rolling Stone writer James Hunter, like both Kellman and Browne, compared the album to "Janet Jackson at her best: She's a pop star, but she's making the most of her big studio budgets and is following her muse." He described the set as "mainstream soul with eccentric details and shadings" and gave the album four stars out of five.

Vibe writer Laura Checkoway gave Afrodisiac three and a half out of five stars and noted it as "a far cry from the pleasing pubescent fluff of her formative years", and although she felt that "Brandy's sultry alto drowns on some songs", she acknowledged that "while Brandy's musical liaison with Timbaland is what some people might call a match made in heaven, it's her crazy, sexy, cool revival that's the true bliss of this fourth coming." Steve Jones from USA Today gave the album a three out of four stars rating, and commented: "Timbaland provides her with plenty of funk-infused beats to groove to [and] while a few of the tracks are a bit pedestrian, Brandy is still seductive more often that not." Ben Sisario, who wrote for Blender and gave the album three out of five stars, summed the album as "an episode of her growing-pains TV show Moesha: This week, our honey-voiced heroine sheds her girlishness, sexing up to become 'a woman, a passionate woman'," referring to its lyrical makeover. He called non-Timbaland productions like "Talk About Our Love" and "Say You Will" the highlights of the album. In 2012, amid the release of Norwood's sixth studio album Two Eleven, Noah Berlatsky of The Atlantic called Afrodisiac "the best album of Brandy's career and one of the greatest R&B albums of the last 25 years."

== Accolades ==
Awards and nominations for Afrodisiac
Year	Award	Category	Nominee(s)	Result	Ref.
2004	MTV Video Music Award	Best R&B Video	"Talk About Our Love"	Nominated	
2004	MOBO Award	Best Collaboration	"Talk About Our Love"	Nominated	
2005	Grammy Award	Best Contemporary R&B Album	Afrodisiac	Nominated	
2005	Soul Train Music Award	Best R&B/Soul Album, Female	Afrodisiac	Nominated	

=== Year-end rankings ===
Afrodisiac was named the fourth best album of 2004 by Slant Magazine. The publication's editor Sal Cinquemani called it "a devastating yet confident break-up album [and] extraordinarily personal, often heart-wrenching R&B record." David Browne from Entertainment Weekly ranked the album sixth on his "Best of 2004 Music" top ten list and remarked that "Brandy remains the queen of the R&B murmur but the producers, especially the ever-inventive Timbaland, compensate with dramatic, rumbly, off-kilter beats and tones that add gravitas to this rueful ex-teen star. Everything — the rhythms, the mopey songs, Brandy's delivery — simmers, but ferociously." The album finished eighth on Nekesa Mumbi Moody's "10 best albums" list for Associated Press. She wrote that Afrodisiac "was surely [Brandy's] best. From the tell-all, autobiographical themes to the hypnotic beats, this album captures your attention from the first note and refuses to be ignored." Rolling Stone listed Afrodisiac within their "Top 50 Records of 2004" list, and dubbed it "not only her best but also the year's outstanding R&B disc."

Accolades for Afrodisiac
Year	Publication	Accolade	Rank	Ref.
2004	Associated Press	10 Best Albums of 2004	8	
2004	Entertainment Weekly	Best of 2004 Music	6	
2004	Rolling Stone	Top 50 Records of 2004	–	
2004	Slant Magazine	Top 10 Albums of 2004	4	
2004	Stylus Magazine	The Top 40 Albums of 2004 (Alex Macpherson)	12	
2004	Stylus Magazine	The Top 40 Albums of 2004 (David Drake)	16	
2007	The Guardian	1000 Albums to Hear Before You Die	–	
2010	Slant Magazine	Best of the Aughts: Albums	115	

== Commercial performance ==
Afrodisiac debuted at number three on the US Billboard 200—behind Lloyd Banks' The Hunger for More and Usher's Confessions—and at number four on the Top R&B/Hip-Hop Albums, selling 131,700 copies in its first week. Though sales soon declined and the album fell short off the upper half of the Billboard 200 in its eighth week, it was eventually certified gold by the Recording Industry Association of America (RIAA) for shipments of 500,000 copies, including actual sales of 417,000 copies.

Internationally, Afrodisiac failed to reach the top thirty on all of the charts it appeared on except for Japan and Switzerland, where it managed to debut at numbers ten and 26, respectively. In the United Kingdom, the album was awarded a silver certification by the British Phonographic Industry (BPI) on September 24, 2004, for selling 60,000 copies.

== Impact and legacy ==
Despite its critical success, the album was largely seen as a commercial disappointment compared to Brandy's previous studio albums, due to the less-than-expected performance of its singles and the album itself. Both Brandy and Timbaland later expressed frustration with the album, citing label interference with the creative process, politics, and mismanagement for the album's performance. After failing to properly secure a joint-headlining tour with Usher, Brandy asked for and received an unconditional release from Atlantic Records in October 2004, citing her wish "to move on" as the main reason for her decision. Completing her contract with the label, a greatest hits album titled The Best of Brandy was released in March 2005. Released without any new material, it reached the top thirty in Australia, the United Kingdom and the United States, where the collection was appreciated by contemporary critics who noted the creativity of Brandy's back catalog. Andy Kellman of AllMusic expressed: "This set, unlike so many other anthologies from her contemporaries, hardly confirms dwindling creativity or popularity." Thereupon, she reportedly began shopping a new record deal under the auspices of Knockout Entertainment, her brother Ray J's vanity label.

Although not initially receiving public and commercial praise until years after its release, the album is widely revered by critics, musicians, audiences. Serving as an inspiration for other artists, Afrodisiac has been credited as one of a precursors to the PBR&B subgenre. In a 2014 music and fashion conversation with NPR, singer and model Solange discussed the album, saying "Brandy is really the foundation of a lot of this very innovative, progressive, experimental R&B. Brandy really influenced a lot of that. Frank Ocean will say it. Miguel will say it." Barbadian singer Rihanna revealed in an interview with Entertainment Weekly that her third studio album Good Girl Gone Bad (2007) was primarily influenced by Afrodisiac, stating: "Brandy's album really helped to inspire, because that album I listen to all day, all night when I was in the studio [...] I really admired that every song was a great song." Rock musician John Frusciante, guitarist of the rock group Red Hot Chili Peppers, mentioned that Brandy and the album were the "main inspiration" behind the guitar work on the Red Hot Chili Peppers' Grammy Award-winning album Stadium Arcadium (2006). In 2008, singer Beyoncé chose the album cut "Focus" for her personal music playlist on iTunes, citing her love for the lyrics, as well as Brandy's voice and vocal arrangements. Hip hop producer Hit-Boy has often lauded the album as an influence on his work via his social media outlets. Singer Nivea interpolated the song "I Tried" on her song "Love Hurts" (2010).

== Track listing ==
Afrodisiac – Standard edition
No.	Title	Writer(s)	Producer(s)	Length
1.	"Who I Am"	Warryn Campbell; Joi Campbell	Baby Dubb; Brandy Norwood^{[b]}	3:35
2.	"Afrodisiac"	Kenisha Pratt; Kenneth Pratt; Isaac Phillips; Timothy Mosley	Timbaland; Norwood^{[b]}	3:47
3.	"Who Is She 2 U"	Walter Millsap III; Candice Nelson; Mosley; Leon Ware; Jacqueline Hilliard	Timbaland; Norwood^{[b]}	4:43
4.	"Talk About Our Love" (featuring Kanye West)	Kanye West; Harold Lilly; Carlos Wilson; Louis Wilson; Ricardo A. Wilson; Claude Cave II	West; Norwood^{[b]}	3:34
5.	"I Tried"	Millsap; Nelson; Mosley; Will Champion; Steve Harris; Chris Martin; Guy Berryman; Jonny Buckland	Timbaland; Norwood^{[b]}	4:45
6.	"Where You Wanna Be" (featuring T.I.)	West; Lilly	West; Norwood^{[b]}	3:32
7.	"Focus"	Millsap; Nelson; Phillips; Mosley	Timbaland; Norwood^{[b]}	4:07
8.	"Sadiddy"	Pratt; Pratt; Phillips; Mosley	Timbaland; Norwood^{[b]}	4:00
9.	"Turn It Up"	Millsap; Nelson; Mosley	Timbaland; Norwood^{[b]}	4:13
10.	"Necessary"	Rico Wade; Patrick Brown; Ray Murray; Cee-Lo Green	Organized Noise; Norwood^{[b]}	3:59
11.	"Say You Will"	Theron Feemster	Ron "Neff-U" Feemster; Big Chuck^{[a]}; Norwood^{[b]}	3:50
12.	"Come as You Are"	Stephen Garrett; Mosley	Timbaland; Norwood^{[b]}	3:44
13.	"Finally"	Millsap; Nelson; Mosley; Norwood; Hans Zimmer; Nick Glennie-Smith; Steven Stern; Don Harper	Timbaland; Norwood^{[b]}	3:53
14.	"How I Feel"	Millsap; Nelson; Erick Walls	Millsap; Norwood^{[b]}	4:41
15.	"Should I Go"	Millsap; Nelson; Mosley; Berryman; Buckland; Champion; Martin	Timbaland; Norwood^{[b]}	4:56
Total length:				61:19

Afrodisiac – Japanese edition (bonus track)
No.	Title	Writer(s)	Producer(s)	Length
16.	"Nodding Off"	Millsap; Nelson; Mosley	Timbaland; Norwood^{[b]}	4:10
Total length:				65:29

Afrodisiac – French limited edition (bonus tracks)
No.	Title	Writer(s)	Producer(s)	Length
16.	"Sirens"	Garrett; Mosley	Timbaland; Norwood^{[b]}	3:59
17.	"Like It Was Yesterday"	Michael Flowers	Mike City	3:53
18.	"Nodding Off"	Millsap; Nelson; Mosley	Timbaland; Norwood^{[b]}	4:10
Total length:				73:21

Notes

- ^{^[a]} signifies a co-producer
- ^{^[b]} signifies a vocal producer

Sample credits

- "Who Is She 2 U" contains a sample of Jacqueline Hilliard's "Instant Love" (1968)
- "Talk About Our Love" contains a sample of Mandrill's "Gilly Hines" (1977) from the album We Are One
- "I Tried" contains a sample of Iron Maiden's "The Clansman" (1998), and Coldplay's "Sparks" (2000)
- "Where You Wanna Be" contains a sample of Janis Ian's "Jesse" (1974)
- "Turn It Up" interpolates "Up Jumps Da Boogie" by Timbaland & Magoo (1997)
- "Finally" contains a sample of Hans Zimmer's "Rock House Jail" from The Rock soundtrack (1996)
- "Should I Go" contains a sample of Coldplay's "Clocks" (2002)
- "Nodding Off" contains a sample of Sunny Deol & Amrita Singh's "Ek Din Jab Hum Jawaan Hongay" (1983)

== Personnel ==
Credits adapted from the liner notes of Afrodisiac.

- Liz Barrett – art direction
- Miri Ben-Ari – violin
- Parris Bowens – keyboard
- Bruce Buechner – engineer
- Jo Ann Campbell – backing vocals
- Demacio Castellon – engineering assistant
- Ricky Chao – engineering assistant
- Sean Davis – engineer
- Jimmy Douglass – engineer, mixing
- Blake English – engineer
- Roger Ericson – photography
- Bruce Fowler – conduction
- Brian Gardner – mastering
- Steve "Static" Garrett – backing vocals
- Chris Gehringer – mastering
- Nick Glennie-Smith – conduction
- Larry Gold – conduction
- Don Harper – conduction
- Mike Hartnett – guitar
- Jermeal Hicks – engineering assistant
- Kenny Hicks – vocal producer
- Keenan "Kee Note" Holloway – bass guitar
- Jun Ishizeki – engineer
- Glenn S. Jeffrey – guitar
- Cha Cha Jones – engineer
- Kyambo Joshua – executive producer
- Craig Kallman – executive producer
- Dave Lopez – mixing
- Manny Marroquin – mixing
- George "Spanky" McCurdy – percussion
- Peter Mokran – mixing
- Tim Mosley – backing vocals, mixing
- Brandy Norwood – executive producer, lead vocals, vocal producer
- Julian Peploe – design
- DeMonica Plummer – conduction
- Ervin Pope – keyboard
- Kenisha Pratt – backing vocals
- Kenneth Pratt – backing vocals
- Halsey Quemere – engineering assistant
- Dave Robbins – keyboard
- Gee Roberson – executive producer
- Shorty B. – bass guitar
- Eugene Toale – engineer
- Thaddeus T. Tribbett – bass guitar
- Eric Walls – guitar

== Charts ==
=== Weekly charts ===
2004 weekly chart performance for Afrodisiac
Chart (2004)	Peak position
Australian Albums (ARIA)	53
Australian Urban Albums (ARIA)	10
Canadian Albums (Nielsen SoundScan)	34
Canadian R&B Albums (Nielsen SoundScan)	13
Dutch Albums (Album Top 100)	45
French Albums (SNEP)	57
German Albums (Offizielle Top 100)	44
Japanese Albums (Oricon)	10
Norwegian Albums (VG-lista)	34
Scottish Albums (Official Charts)	69
South African Albums (RISA)	7
Swedish Albums (Sverigetopplistan)	45
Swiss Albums (Schweizer Hitparade)	26
UK Albums (Official Charts)	32
UK R&B Albums (Official Charts)	13
US Billboard 200	3
US Top R&B/Hip-Hop Albums (Billboard)	4

2025 weekly chart performance for Afrodisiac
Chart (2025)	Peak position
Hungarian Physical Albums (MAHASZ)	28

=== Year-end charts ===
Year-end chart performance for Afrodisiac
Chart (2004)	Position
US Top R&B/Hip-Hop Albums (Billboard)	62

== Certifications ==
Certifications for Afrodisiac
Region	Certification	Certified units/sales
Japan (RIAJ)	Gold	100,000^{^}
United Kingdom (BPI)	Silver	60,000^{^}
United States (RIAA)	Gold	500,000^{^}
^{^} Shipments figures based on certification alone.

== Release history ==
Release dates and formats for Afrodisiac
Region	Date	Edition(s)	Format(s)	Label(s)	Ref.
France	June 25, 2004	Standard	CD	East West	
Switzerland	June 25, 2004	Standard	CD	Warner Music	
Germany	June 28, 2004	Standard	CD	Warner Music	
United Kingdom	June 28, 2004	Standard	CD	Atlantic	
United States	June 29, 2004	Standard	CD	Atlantic	
Japan	June 30, 2004	Standard	CD	Warner Music	
France	October 18, 2004	Limited	CD	East West	

== Bibliography ==
- Mosley, Timothy (November 17, 2015). The Emperor of Sound: A Memoir. Amistad. p. 123. ISBN 978-0061936968.
