= Who Is She 2 U =

2005 single by Brandy

Single by Brandy

from the album Afrodisiac
- Released: July 27, 2004
- Recorded: 2003
- Studio: Hit Factory Criteria (Miami)
- Genre: R&B; urban pop
- Length: 4:43 (album version); 3:47 (radio edit)
- Label: Atlantic
- Songwriters: Walter Millsap III; Candice Nelson; Timothy Mosley; Jacqueline Hilliard; Leon Ware
- Producers: Timbaland; Walter Millsap III

Brandy singles chronology
"Talk About Our Love" (2004)	"Who Is She 2 U" (2004)	"Afrodisiac" (2004)

Music video
- "Who Is She 2 U" on YouTube

"Who Is She 2 U" is a song by American recording artist Brandy from her fourth studio album, Afrodisiac (2004). It was written by Candice Nelson, Walter Millsap III and Timbaland, and produced by the latter. The song is built around a sample of "Instant Love" (1977) by American singer Leon Ware. Due to the inclusion of the sample, he and Jacqueline Hilliard are also credited as songwriters. Based on true events, the song describes a woman who is suspicious about her mate's awkward behavior around a seemingly unfamiliar woman. The dramatic up-tempo incorporates piano keys, flutes, chamber pop string melodies and go-go drum programming.

The song was released as the album's second and final North American single in July 2004, and as its third single throughout Australia and Europe by March 2005. "Who Is She 2 U" failed to make much impact on the charts around the world, peaking at number 85 on the US Billboard Hot 100 and number 43 on the Hot R&B/Hip-Hop Songs chart. Elsewhere, the song reached the top fifty in the United Kingdom and the top ten of the German Urban Chart. The music video for "Who Is She 2 U", directed by Jake Nava, was filmed throughout Los Angeles, California in August 2004. It features Norwood as an all-knowing narrator, who is watching the central male character's every move throughout the city while catching him in the act with various women.

== Background ==
In June 2002, Norwood gave birth to her daughter Sy'rai. Soon, she resumed work on her then-untitled fourth studio album with producer Mike City and companion Robert "Big Bert" Smith, the latter of which served as the album's executive producer and A&R. He replaced longtime contributor and mentor Rodney "Darkchild" Jerkins, who Norwood felt was not going in the same direction creatively after all, and kept her from exploring her "versatility, [her] creativity and [her] art." The couple eventually finished a number of demo recordings and at least four full songs until late November 2002, and although Smith expected the album to drop by spring 2003 at one time or another, Norwood and Big Bert ended their relationship in mid-2003, resulting in the album's delay and several personnel changes. Norwood eventually decided to scrap most of the project, and instead enlisted producer Timbaland, with whom the couple had previously worked on Kiley Dean's Simple Girl album, as the album's main contributor. Impressed by Timbaland's input, Norwood rediscovered the musical affection, she had missed on Full Moon and its technical priority.

== Conception ==
With the help of Timbaland protégés such as Candice Nelson, Steve "Static" Garrett, and co-producer Walter Millsap III the pair worked on several tracks for Norwood's fourth album, including "Who Is She 2 U." The song was one of the first songs on Afrodisiac, Norwood and Timbaland collaborated on. Incorporating a sample of the 1968 song "Instant Love," written by Jacqueline Hilliard and Leon Ware, it was penned by Nelson, Millsap and Timbaland, while production was handled by the latter two. Norwood's vocals were recorded at The Hit Factory Criteria in Miami, Florida and Amerycan Recording Studios, Los Angeles, California, with production overseen by herself. Timbaland and Jimmy Douglass mixed the track, while Douglass, Blake English, Demacio Castellon, Jeremal Hicks, and Halsey Quemere all assisted in the audio engineering of the track. Lyrically, the song's protagonist describes a confrontation with her cheating boyfriend, who "tries to two-time, three-time and even four-time his way into multiple relationships." Described as "a caught-in-the-act tale set to throwback soul" by Newsday, "Who Is She 2 U" was basically written for Norwood's female audience. "It's a song I'm sure so many females have experienced," she elaborated. "And I've definitely experienced this before, just like, 'Who's that? Let me know what's going on!'" She also termed the song "reminiscent of a vintage Mary J. Blige. I was expressing my innermost feelings about life, love and relationships. It was me at my most raw. He [Timbaland] really encouraged me to do my best."

== Release and promotion ==
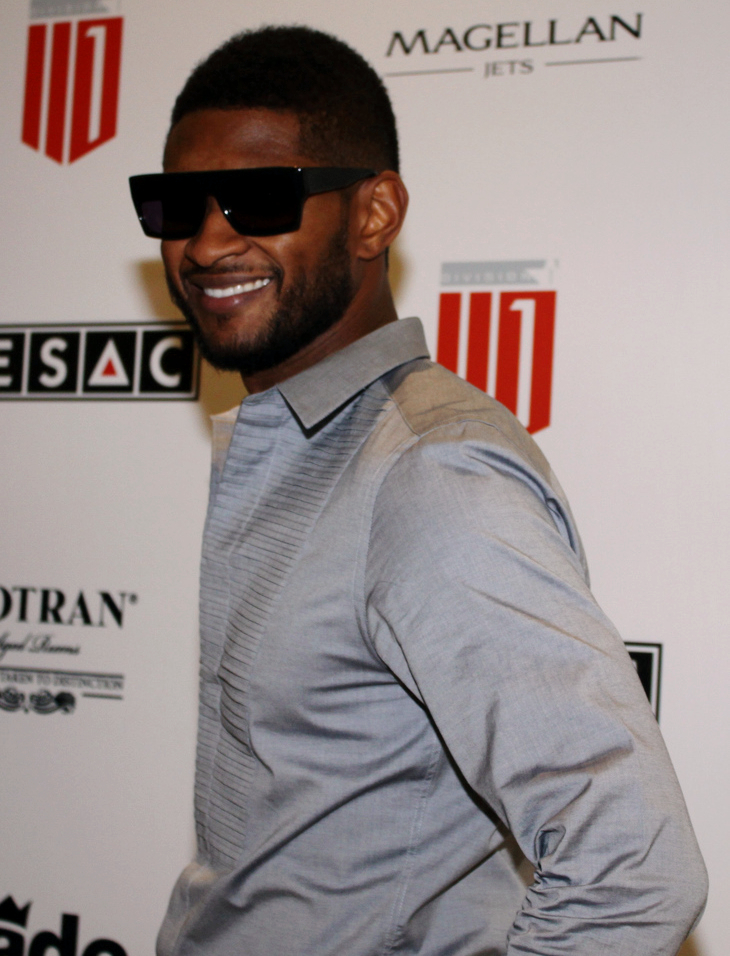
Usher appeared on a self-recorded duet remix of "Who Is She 2 U".

In late October 2003, an early version of "Who Is She 2 U" was presented along with two other Timbaland productions on Afrodisiac, "Afrodisiac" and album cut "Finally", onto the Brandy Special Music Project account on ratethemusic.com, a website that asks people's opinions on new tracks from various artists. The leaked version featured a different vocal production and ending from the one that was eventually placed on Afrodisiac. The final version of the song was first played during an interview with American hip hop DJ Funkmaster Flex on New York City radio station Hot 97. "Who Is She 2 U" was among those Afrodisiac tracks that were streamed over one million times via mtv.com's The Leak in the week preceding the album's release in June 2004.

"Who Is She 2 U" was officially announced as the album's second single in a press release from July 9, 2004. While rapper Fabolous was supposed to appear on the remix of the song, his version received no official release from Atlantic Records, though it was later leaked via internet and mixtapes. Eric "E-Smoove" Miller. Fellow R&B singer Usher, who was reportedly expected to appear on the album at one time or another, re-recorded the song on his own prior to the single's release in the United States, replacing parts of Norwood's vocals for a male perspective. While it received no official release nor was promoted by Atlantic, because of clearance issues concerning Usher's vocals, the unofficial duet version received some airplay, mostly on mix shows, in the US.

== Chart performance ==
First released in the United States as the second single from Afrodisiac, "Who Is She 2 U" debuted and peaked at number 85 on the US Billboard Hot 100 chart in the week of August 28, 2004. the fifth-highest debut of the week. A significant departure from previous runs, the song eventually became Norwood's lowest-charting, video-accompanied single on the Billboard Hot 100 by then. Just as previous single "Talk About Our Love" the track was more successful on Billboard's component charts. "Who Is She 2 U" reached number 20 on the Hot R&B/Hip-Hop Singles Sales chart and number 31 on the Hot Singles Sales chart, as well as the top 50 on the Hot R&B/Hip-Hop Airplay and Hot R&B/Hip-Hop Songs charts. The remix single also peaked at number two on the Hot Dance Singles Sales chart.

Outside North America, Who Is She 2 U" was preceded by Afrodisiac's title track and served as the album's third single as well as a promotional single in support of Norwood's first best of album, The Best of Brandy (2005). In April 2005, the song reached number 50 on the UK Singles Chart and number 99 on the Australian Singles Chart, both positions also being Norwood's lowest-charting peaks on those particular charts up to then. While it failed to chart on the German Singles Chart, "Who Is She 2 U" managed to reach number 7 on the German Urban Chart. The song also peaked at number 14 on the UK R&B Singles Chart.

== Music video ==
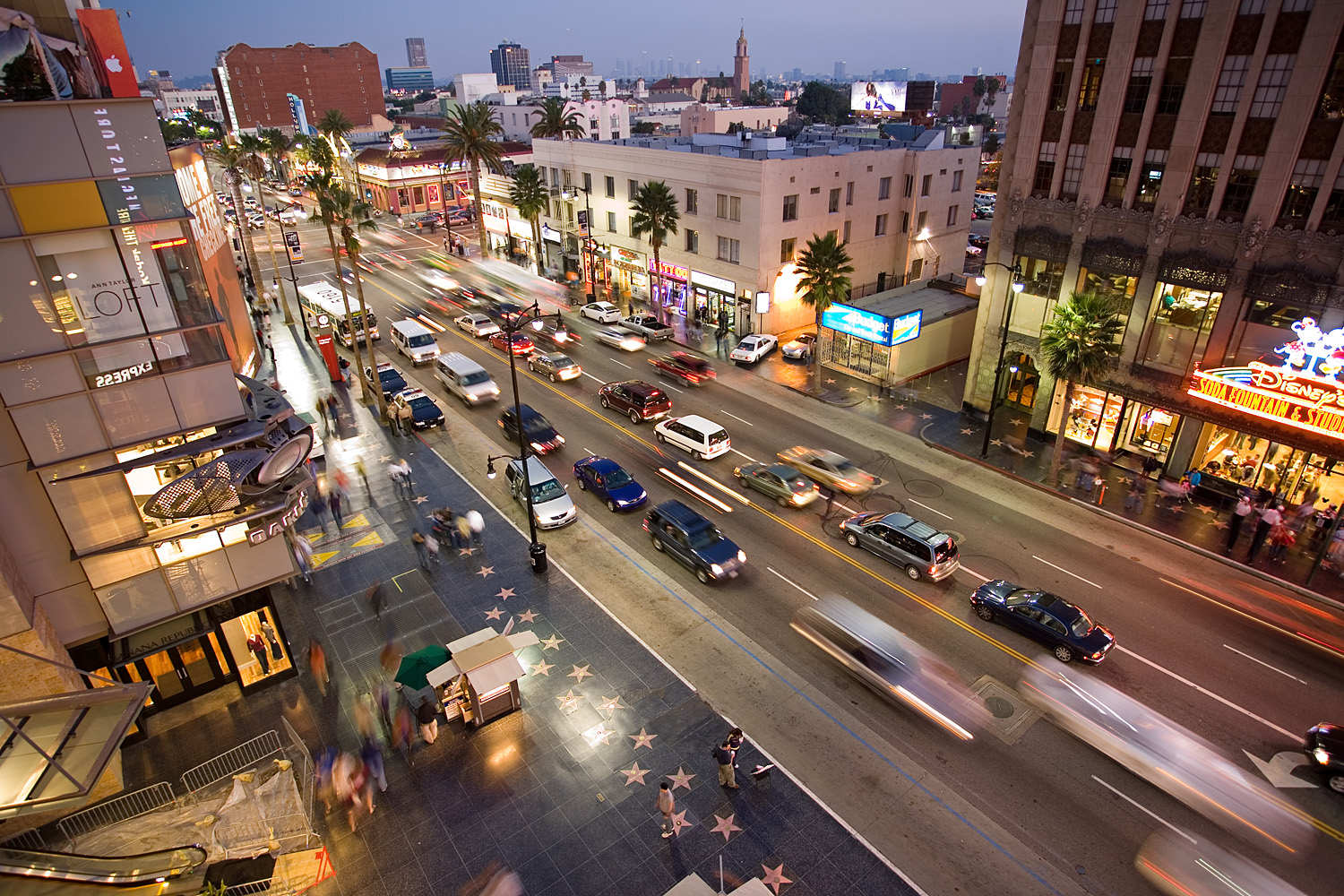
The music video for "Who Is She 2 U" was filmed in various locations throughout Los Angeles.

The accompanying music video for "Who Is She 2 U", filmed by English director Jake Nava, was photographed in various locations throughout Los Angeles in the week of August 5, 2004. Choreographed by Laurie Ann Gibson, the video harks back on authentic street sensibility, showing Norwood in normal neighborhood settings. "I wanted to be fashion-forward, so we're going to give the girl a little fashion," she stated in an interview with MTV News while shooting. "It's going to be young and fun and sexy, but not over the top – still down to earth." Fabolous was originally expected to sign on to shoot additional scenes for a remixed version of the clip; however, plans weren't put into practice. "Who Is She 2 U" premiered at the end of its BET making of episode of Access Granted on August 24, 2004.

In the video, Norwood plays an all-seeing, all-knowing narrator, who gives the central male character pause with her wicked glances that let him know she is watching his every move. The pursuit starts with the singer performing the first lines of her song in the back of a cruising bus, while observing her boarding man next to a female, both discussing vehemently with each other. She is constantly moving and dancing, before the scene shifts to a scaffolding in front of a fenced building, where she performs the chorus in dusty backgrounds. The next scene shows her standing under a traffic light at a plied crossing, wearing a grey outfit and large glasses, wherefrom she enters a nearby barber shop and performs afresh in a hairdresser chair. At the same time, the camera shows her man flirting with two girls. The video ends with a backflash on all locations Norwood was seen at, also catching the daytime in front of the sinking sun.

== Track listings ==
All tracks written by Walter Millsap III, Candice Nelson, Timothy Mosley, Jacqueline Hilliard and Leon Ware.

International maxi CD single
No.	Title	Producer(s)	Length
1.	"Who Is She 2 U" (Radio Edit)	Timbaland; Brandy Norwood^{[a]}	3:47
2.	"Who Is She 2 U" (Josh Harris Old School Edit)	Timbaland; Norwood^{[a]}; Josh Harris^{[b]}	3:53
3.	"Who Is She 2 U" (Davidson Ospina Edit)	Timbaland; Norwood^{[a]}; Davidson Ospina^{[b]}	4:01

US maxi CD single
No.	Title	Producer(s)	Length
1.	"Who Is She 2 U" (Hani Club Mix)	Timbaland; Norwood^{[a]}; Hani^{[b]}	7:58
2.	"Who Is She 2 U" (Josh Harris Old School Club Mix)	Timbaland; Norwood^{[a]}; Harris^{[b]}	6:24
3.	"Who Is She 2 U" (FTL Club Mix)	Timbaland; Norwood^{[a]}; Jerry Santiago^{[b]}	7:45
4.	"Who Is She 2 U" (E-Smoove Bump Mix)	Timbaland; Norwood^{[a]}; E-Smoove^{[b]}	6:38
5.	"Who Is She 2 U" (Johnny Budz Club Mix)	Timbaland; Norwood^{[a]}; Johnny Budz^{[b]}	6:14
6.	"Who Is She 2 U" (Hani Dub)	Timbaland; Norwood^{[a]}; Hani^{[b]}	6:10
7.	"Who Is She 2 U" (Sugar Dib Solo Dub)	Timbaland; Norwood^{[a]}; Ean Sugarman^{[b]}; Vincent di Pasquale^{[b]}	8:12
8.	"Who Is She 2 U" (FTL Dub Mix)	Timbaland; Norwood^{[a]}; Santiago^{[b]}	7:14
9.	"Who Is She 2 U" (Josh Harris Alternative Mix)	Timbaland; Norwood^{[a]}; Harris^{[b]}	4:30
10.	"Who Is She 2 U" (Pull's Passionate Mix)	Timbaland; Norwood^{[a]}; Eddie Frente^{[b]}	4:16

Notes

- ^{^a} denotes vocal producer
- ^{^b} denotes additional producer

== Credits and personnel ==
Credits are lifted from the liner notes of Afrodisiac.

- Parris Bowens – keyboard
- Demacio "Demo" Castellón – assistant engineer
- Jimmy Douglass – engineer, mixing
- Blake English – engineer
- Larry Gold – conductor
- Jeremal Hicks – assistant engineer
- George McCurdy – percussion
- Brandy Norwood – vocals, vocal producer
- Timbaland – mixing, producer
- Thaddaeus Tribbett – bass
- Halsey Quemere – assistant engineer

== Charts ==
Weekly chart performance for "Who Is She 2 U"
Chart (2004–2005)	Peak position
Australia (ARIA)	99
Australian Urban (ARIA)	22
Germany (Deutsche Urban Charts)	7
Netherlands (Urban Top 100)	61
UK Singles (Official Charts)	50
UK Hip Hop/R&B (Official Charts)	14
US Billboard Hot 100	85
US Dance Singles Sales (Billboard) Remixes	2
US Hot R&B/Hip-Hop Songs (Billboard)	43

== Release history ==
Release dates and formats for "Who Is She 2 U"
Region	Date	Format(s)	Label	Ref.
United States	July 27, 2004	Digital download; rhythmic contemporary radio; urban contemporary radio	Atlantic	
United States	August 10, 2004	12-inch vinyl	Atlantic	
United States	October 12, 2004	12-inch vinyl (Dance Mixes)	Atlantic	
United States	October 19, 2004	Maxi CD	Atlantic	
United Kingdom	March 21, 2005	CD	Atlantic	
Australia	April 11, 2005	Maxi CD	Warner Music	
