= The Documentary 2 =

2015 studio album by the Game

Studio album by the Game
- Released: October 9, 2015
- Recorded: 2015
- Studios: Record Room (Miami); Chalice Recording (Hollywood)
- Genres: West Coast hip-hop; gangsta rap
- Length: 73:18
- Labels: Blood Money; Fifth Amendment; eOne
- Producers: The Game; Boi-1da; Stat Quo; Cash "Wack100" Jones; B-Heat; Cardo; Caviar; Mikhail; Cool & Dre; DJ Premier; Flippa; Hit-Boy; iLLA; Jahlil Beats; Jelly Roll; Johnny Juliano; JProof; Kent Jones; KirkKezi; the Mekanics; Mike WiLL Made-It; Pops; Sevn Thomas; Streetrunner; Tarik Azzouz; will.i.am

The Game chronology
Blood Moon: Year of the Wolf (2014)	The Documentary 2 (2015)	The Documentary 2.5 (2015)

Singles from The Documentary 2
- 1. "100" Released: June 25, 2015

The Documentary 2 is the sixth studio album by American rapper the Game. It was released on October 9, 2015, by Blood Money Entertainment, Fifth Amendment Entertainment, and eOne Music. The album serves as a sequel to his debut album. The project is first half of a two-piece project with other half The Documentary 2.5, which was released the following week. The album features guest appearances from Dr. Dre, Drake, Ice Cube, Snoop Dogg, Kendrick Lamar, Ab-Soul, Kanye West and Future, among others.

Preceding its release, the album was supported by lead single: "100" featuring Drake.

== Background ==
In 2015, in an interview with Power 106, the Game announced that the album was about 90% complete and once Dr. Dre gets back from his vacation, him and Dre would be finishing recording the album. The Game also said that his children were his motivation to finish the album, speaking about being confident on his growth as a rapper: "I listened to my first album and everybody thinks it's so amazing, but I think I'm better than that. I listened to it and heard all of the flaws of the young me, and I'm like, 'Man I would have never done this song like that today.'" According to the Game, Dr. Dre was excited about the album that he called The Documentary 2 would be the best rap album in five years. On July 21, 2015, the Game revealed that Diddy said The Documentary 2 is "his best album yet".

== Recording and production ==
On April 12, 2015, the Game released a video, titled "The Making of 'The Documentary 2'", and it shows him in the studio with Meek Mill, working on a song, called "Soundtrack". The video also features cameo appearances from Cool & Dre and Travis Scott. During the 2015's BET Awards on North Carolina's Power 98, the Game said that he has been working with these record producers such as Timbaland, Swizz Beatz, Pharrell Williams, DJ Premier, the Alchemist, Mikhail, Jahlil Beats, Just Blaze, Scott Storch, and Mike Will Made It. While the Game was spending the entire week in the studio with Kanye West, the Game stated that "You get a good solid week out of 'Ye if you have history." On July 6, 2015, the Game shared some footage of himself in the studio with DJ Mustard, Eric Bellinger, YG, Ty Dolla Sign, Bongo 'the Drum Gahd', Busta Rhymes and Keyshia Cole. The video features one of the snippets was a song with Game and Kendrick Lamar that was surfaced later. Joe Moses, Jay 305 and Skeme appeared in the video. Many unofficial sites posted possible track lists for the album. On July 21, 2015, the Game posted a picture of himself on the toilet, while recording a song for the album on his Instagram. Few days later, the Game posted another picture of himself working on another song with American R&B singer Tyrese, which he said that this collaboration would be on the album. The Game confirmed that Nas, Lil Wayne, E-40, Scarface, Busta Rhymes and YG would be featured on the second disc for the album, called The Documentary 2.5.

== Release and promotion ==
On August 28, 2014, the Game stated that the album would be released on January 18, 2015, and will serve as the 10th anniversary of the first installment. On October 14, 2014, the Game released a compilation album, Blood Moon: Year of the Wolf. On January 30, 2015, a picture of Dr. Dre, the Game, and Ice Cube was posted on Instagram. The inclusion suggested that Dre and Cube were reuniting on the album. On March 12, 2015, the Game announced that the album would be released on June 30, which is his oldest son's birthday. In an interview with Miss Info, Game said spoke about the release of the album. "I feel like I could've released it after The Documentary, but ten years seems perfectly fine. It's my sixth studio album, my sixth solo album, and I think that the 10th anniversary is huge. So, why not put it out ten years later?"

On June 28, 2015, the Game announced that the album would be released on August 7, 2015. Target started promoting the album in stores. The cover shown a new release date of August 28. On July 16, 2015, the Game posted a picture of Tupac with the caption, "Almost time to wrap this album. #TheDocumentary2". On August 30, 2015, he released the cover art for the upcoming album and announced a release date of September 25, 2015. On September 9, 2015, it was revealed that the release date was pushed back to October 9, 2015. On September 18, 2015, the album made available for pre-order, detailing the track listing. On September 22, the Game announced that The Documentary 2 would be a double disc album with a total of 38 tracks, detailing to have disc one releasing on October 9, 2015 and then disc two releasing on October 16, 2015. A documentary about the album, showing how the album was made with studio sessions and video shoots, was released after disc one was released; it is titled The Documentary 2: The Making of the Album.

== Critical reception ==
Professional ratings
Aggregate scores
Source	Rating
Metacritic	75/100
Review scores
Source	Rating
AllMusic	4/5 stars
Billboard	4.5/5 stars
Exclaim!	7/10
Pitchfork Media	7.2/10
HipHopDX	4/5 stars
Consequence of Sound	B
The Source	4/5 stars
XXL	4/5 stars
Zumic	4/5 stars
NOW	4/5 stars

The Documentary 2 received strong reviews from contemporary music critics. Billboard gave the album 4.5 out of 5 stars. At Metacritic, which assigns a normalized rating out of 100 to reviews from mainstream critics, the album received an average score of 75, which indicates "generally favorable reviews", based on 13 reviews.

== Commercial performance ==
The Documentary 2 debuted at number two on the US Billboard 200, with 95,000 album-equivalent units, which included 85,000 pure album sales.

It serves as the Game's seventh top-ten album in the United States. The album dropped to the number 11 in its second week, earning an additional 28,000 album-equivalent units. As of November 2015, The Documentary 2 had accumulated 140,000 album-equivalent units in the United States, with 116,000 being pure sales.

== Track listing ==
The Documentary 2 – Standard version
No.	Title	Writer(s)	Producer(s)	Length
1.	"Intro"	Michael Hernandez; Rico Evans	The Mekanics	0:58
2.	"On Me" (featuring Kendrick Lamar)	Jayceon Taylor; Kendrick Duckworth; Uforo Ebong	Bongo	4:45
3.	"Step Up" (featuring Dej Loaf and Sha Sha)	Taylor; Deja Trimble; Sharon White; Ebong; Jaborn Jamal	Bongo	2:47
4.	"Don't Trip" (featuring Ice Cube, Dr. Dre and will.i.am)	Taylor; O'Shea Jackson; Andre Young; William Adams, Jr.	will.i.am	4:59
5.	"Standing on Ferraris" (featuring Puff Daddy)	Taylor; Sean Combs; Orlando Tucker	Jahlil Beats	4:11
6.	"Dollar and a Dream" (featuring Ab-Soul)	Taylor; Herbert Stevens IV; Barbara Acklin; Marcello Valenzano; Andre Lyon; Daryl Jones; Ray Fraser	Cool & Dre; iLLA (add.); Just BonaFide (add.); Kent Jones (add.)	5:52
7.	"Made in America" (featuring Marcus Black)	Taylor; Ebong; Marcus Black	Bongo	3:14
8.	"Hashtag" (featuring Jelly Roll)	Taylor; David Drew; Ebong	Bongo; Jelly Roll	2:59
9.	"Circles" (featuring Q-Tip, Eric Bellinger and Sha Sha)	Taylor; Kamaal Fareed; Eric Bellinger; White; Ebong; Ronald Colson	Bongo; Flippa (add.); JProof (add.)	4:11
10.	"Uncle (Skit)"		Stat Quo; the Game	2:04
11.	"Dedicated" (featuring Future and Sonyae)	Taylor; Nayvadius Wilburn; Sonyae Elise; Ebong; Chauncey Hollis	Bongo; Hit-Boy	5:45
12.	"Bitch You Ain't Shit"	Taylor; Kannon Cross; Brandon Broadnax; Robert Newkirk	Caviar; B-Heat; KirkKezi	3:05
13.	"Summertime" (featuring Jelly Roll)	Taylor; Drew; Michael Williams II	Mike WiLL Made It	3:43
14.	"Mula" (featuring Kanye West)	Taylor; Kanye West; Barbara Manson; Cash Jones Sr.; Joshua Carter; Marcus Moody; Matthew Samuels; Rupert Thomas Jr.; Sarah Barthel; Stanley Benton	Boi-1da; Sevn Thomas	3:55
15.	"The Documentary 2"	Taylor; Christopher Martin	DJ Premier	4:38
16.	"New York, New York"	Taylor; Nicholas Warwar; Tarik Azzouz	Streetrunner; Azzouz (add.)	2:21
17.	"100" (featuring Drake)	Taylor; Aubrey Graham; Ronald LaTour; Johnny Juliano	Cardo; Juliano	5:34
18.	"Just Another Day"	Taylor; Ebong	Bongo	3:50
19.	"LA" (featuring Snoop Dogg, will.i.am and Fergie)	Taylor; Calvin Broadus, Jr.; Adams, Jr.; Stacy Ferguson	will.i.am	5:27
Total length:				73:18

Notes

- "On Me" features additional vocals from Dr. Dre

Sample credits

- "On Me" contains a sample of "On and On" (written by Jaborn Jamal) performed by Erykah Badu.
- "Step Up" contains a sample of "Step In the Arena" performed by Gang Starr, in addition to chorus vocals from "I Get Around" performed by Tupac Shakur; and samples "I Wanna Be Down" performed by Brandy.
- "Don't Trip" contains samples of "Rebirth of Slick (Cool Like Dat)" performed by Digable Planets and Funky Worm, and "More Peas" performed by Fred Wesley and the J.B.'s.
- "Standing on Ferraris" contains samples of "I Put a Spell on You" performed by Screamin' Jay Hawkins, and "California My Way" performed by the Main Ingredient.
- "Circles" contains samples of Going in Circles performed by Isaac Hayes, Montara performed by Bobby Hutcherson, and "Song Cry" performed by Jay-Z.
- "Uncle Skit" contains a sample of Cutie Pie performed by One Way.
- "Mula" contains a sample of "Fall in Love" performed by Phantogram.
- "The Documentary 2" contains a sample of "Rickard Escapes" performed by Jerry Goldsmith.
- "100" contains a sample of "Feel the Fire" performed by Peabo Bryson.
- "Just Another Day" contains a sample of "Where I'm From" performed by the Game and Nate Dogg.
- "LA" contains a sample of "Savoir Faire" performed by Chic.

== Personnel ==
- Adam Turchin – saxophone
- Koofreh Umoren – trumpet

== Charts ==
=== Weekly charts ===
Chart (2015)	Peak position
Austrian Albums (Ö3 Austria)	32
Belgian Albums (Ultratop Flanders)	43
Belgian Albums (Ultratop Wallonia)	122
Canadian Albums (Billboard)	3
Danish Albums (Hitlisten)	35
Dutch Albums (Album Top 100)	39
French Albums (SNEP)	49
German Albums (GfK Entertainment)	22
Irish Albums (IRMA)	10
New Zealand Albums (RMNZ)	5
Norwegian Albums (VG-lista)	22
Scottish Albums (Official Charts)	3
Swedish Albums (Sverigetopplistan)	50
Swiss Albums (Schweizer Hitparade)	9
UK Albums (Official Charts)	4
UK R&B Albums (Official Charts)	2
US Billboard 200	2
US Independent Albums (Billboard)	1
US Top Rap Albums (Billboard)	1
US Top R&B/Hip-Hop Albums (Billboard)	1

=== Year-end charts ===
Chart (2015)	Peak position
US Billboard 200	195
US Independent Albums (Billboard)	11
US Top R&B/Hip-Hop Albums (Billboard)	32
US Rap Albums (Billboard)	20

Chart (2016)	Peak position
US Independent Albums (Billboard)	46
US Top R&B/Hip-Hop Albums (Billboard)	77

== Collector's Edition ==
The Documentary 2 / 2.5 (Collector's Edition)

Box set by the Game
- Released: January 22, 2016
- Recorded: 2015
- Genre: Hip hop
- Length: 147:08
- Labels: Blood Money; eOne
- Producers: The Game; Stat Quo; Cash "Wack100" Jones; the Alchemist; will.i.am; Mr. Bangladesh; Battlecat; Cardo; Caviar; Cool & Dre; DJ Khalil; DJ Mustard; DJ Premier; DJ Quik; Fredwreck; G Koop; Hit-Boy; Illa Da Producer; Jahlil Beats; JProof; Jelly Roll; Johnny Juliano; Kent Jones; Kevin Bivona; Mike & Keys; Mike WiLL Made-It; S1; Skrillex; Streetrunner; the Mekanics; Tone Mason; Travis Barker; Pops; BC Beatz; Flippa; Kiid Planet; Sevn Thomas; Tarik Azzouz; THX; Nastradomas

The three-disc collector's edition of The Documentary 2 was released on January 22, 2016. The bonus disc features guest appearances from Trey Songz and Meek Mill. On the chart dated February 13, 2016, Disc 3 debuted on the Billboard 200 chart at number 134.

=== Track listing ===
Collector's edition bonus tracks – Disc 3
No.	Title	Writer(s)	Producer(s)	Length
1.	"Ride Solo"	Taylor; Valenzano; Lyon; Jones	Jones; Cool & Dre	3:11
2.	"Do It To You" (featuring Trey Songz)	Taylor; Valenzano; Lyon; Jones; Tremaine Neverson	Cool & Dre; Jones	2:53
3.	"The Soundtrack" (featuring Meek Mill)	Taylor; Robert Williams; Bryan Caluya	BC Beatz; Kiid Planet	5:23
4.	"El Chapo" (with Skrillex)	Taylor; Sonny Moore; Shondrae Crawford; Nassir Crawford	Mr. Bangladesh; Skrillex; Nastradomas	3:39
Total length:				15:06

=== Weekly charts ===
Chart (2016)	Peak position
US Billboard 200	134
US Independent Albums (Billboard)	25
US Top R&B/Hip-Hop Albums (Billboard)	33

== See also ==
- List of Billboard number-one R&B/Hip-Hop albums of 2015
