= Afrodisiac (song) =

2004 single by Brandy

Single by Brandy

from the album Afrodisiac
- B-side: "Sirens"
- Released: September 22, 2004
- Recorded: 2003
- Studio: Hit Factory Criteria (Miami, Florida)
- Genre: R&B
- Length: 3:47
- Label: Atlantic
- Songwriters: Isaac Phillips; Kenisha Pratt; Kenneth Pratt; Tim Mosley
- Producer: Timbaland

Brandy singles chronology
"Who Is She 2 U" (2004)	"Afrodisiac" (2004)	"Right Here" (2008)

Music video
- "Afrodisiac" on YouTube

"Afrodisiac" is a song by American recording artist Brandy. It was written by Isaac Phillips, Kenisha Pratt, Kenneth Pratt and Timbaland for her same-titled fourth studio album (2004), with production being handled by the latter. One of the first songs Norwood and Timbaland collaborated on, the record is an uptempo–offbeat R&B song with pop and dance-pop elements, built along on a flute, Afro-Caribbean music influences and 1980s electro sounds. Considered by Norwood as one of her favorites on the album, the track expresses a woman's addictive passion for a person, whom she declares her very own aphrodisiac.

The song was met with the acclaim of contemporary critics. Many praised Norwood's versatility and considered it as one of the stand-out tracks on Afrodisiac for having an innovative and different production when compared to the others. Released as the album's second international single in Europe and Oceania during the third and fourth quarter of 2004, "Afrodisiac" reached number eleven on the UK Singles Chart as well as the top 30 in France and Ireland, and the top 40 in Australia and Switzerland, where it surpassed the success of its predecessor.

The single's music video was directed by Matthew Rolston and marked his second collaboration with Norwood following their 1995 video for "Best Friend". Choreographed by Laurieann Gibson, it was filmed in Los Angeles, California and features Norwood dancing in a water-flooded outtrack world, influenced by white, gold and black color. "Afrodisiac" was performed on a few television shows, such as CD:UK, Top of the Pops, and Billboard Live, but has since been performed frequently on Norwood's concerts and tours, including the 2009 Human World Tour and the 2016 Slayana World Tour.

== Writing and recording ==
"Afrodisiac" was written by frequent Brandy collaborators Isaac Phillips, Kenisha Pratt, and Kenneth Pratt along with rapper Timbaland, while production was handled by the latter. Norwood's vocals were recorded at Hit Factory Criteria in Miami, Florida, with production overseen by herself; Kenisha Pratt, Kenneth Pratt, and Blake English all served as background vocalists. Jimmy Douglass mixed the track, while English, Douglass, Demacio Castellon, Jeremal Hicks, and Halsey Quemere all assisted in the audio engineering of the track.

The track was one of the first songs on the same-titled album that Norwood and her team worked on while recording at the Hit Factory Criteria studios in Miami, Florida. An uptempo–offbeat R&B song with heavy pop and dance-pop influences, "Afrodisiac" was built along on a flute and a synthesised old-school drum machine groove. Critics also noted an "orchestra band feel with a definite Caribbean influence and some 1980s electro sound", which incorporates a baby-cry sample, that bears resemblance to fellow Timbaland production "Are You That Somebody?," a recorded by Aaliyah in 1998. Backing vocals were inspired by Irish singer Enya. Lyrically, Norwood, as the female protagonist, expresses her addictive passion for a special person, whom she declares her very own aphrodisiac, a substance that increases her sexual desire. Speaking of what motivated her to record the song, Norwood stated, "when I first heard that track I was like, ‘Oh my God.’ It was different. I'm not trying to do what I did before. I'm trying to do something different, but still have the same elements that people know me for. And that's what 'Afrodisiac' was." She further added, that "it was great to do a record like that with Timbaland. He was one of my favorite producers, so to work with him was a dream come true [...] you can hear the yearning for love. I never had an aphrodisiac in my life until now." She declared the song her favorite track on the album.

== Critical reception ==
Upon its release, "Afrodisiac" was praised by music critics for its unconventional production, progressive structure, and Norwood's vocal performance. Rachel Kipp from Associated Press wrote that "Afrodisiac" is a "carnival ride", while Nicholas Paul Godkin, writer for Designer magazine, commented that the song "has the feel of a superior Destiny's Child R&B single. Brandy raps a little bit, but it's her unmistakable voice that impresses the most." Describing the song as "innovative and quirky", Tareck Ghoneim from Contactmusic wrote that "Afrodisiac" was "very hard to describe as it is so different so those looking for something fresh may like it. The arrangement is complex that makes the feel of this track engrossing and original. This is progressive R&B and deserves praise." Music Week said the song is "typically polished, shiny R&B". Yahoo! Voices declared the song "bouncy and sexy, a perfect marriage of a sterling vocal performance and cutting-edge production. A standout."

The A.V. Club's Andy Battaglia compared the song to Aaliyah's song "Are You That Somebody?", noting that it "dusts off the baby-cry sample Timbaland made famous with Aaliyah, but the hook is all Brandy – her dry voice circles around itself in a swooping chorus, which sounds open and sexy on her own terms." Azeem Ahmad of MusicOMH showed high favoritism for "Afrodisiac". He stated that "the strong racial connotations in the title shouldn't be mistaken as anything other than a cry for acceptance as a sex symbol in the Beyoncé mould", and added: "gracefully there's a lot more substance to this through the beautifully sung and equally brilliantly produced song. Thankfully there's no hint of 'Independent Women' in the song as Brandy takes a rare honest stance: 'I admit that I'm a prisoner of your sex appeal'." Allmusic writer Andy Kellman ranked the song among his four favorite tracks on the album along with "Talk About Our Love", "Who Is She 2 U" and "Sadiddy".

== Release and performance ==
In late October 2003, an unmastered version of "Afrodisiac" was presented along with two other Timbaland productions, "Who Is She 2 U" and album cut "Finally", onto the Brandy Special Music Project on ratethemusic.com, a website that asks people's opinions on new tracks from various artists, Its internet leak made it an early candidate to become the album's lead single. When Kanye West-produced "Talk About Our Love" was picked as Afrodisiac's first single, Timbaland protested the decision in several magazine interviews. Norwood herself later proclaimed that the album's single choice was finalized by Atlantic Records bosses, while the singer herself had favoured a Timbaland-produced track such as "Afrodisiac" to lead the album: "We had already pretty much recorded the bulk of the album before Kanye West got involved. The label wanted to come out with ‘Talk About Love’ as a single, but I didn't want it to be released [...] It just didn't match the energy of what Timbaland and I had done. I wanted a single that represented the sound and the movie feel of my album."

While "Who Is She 2 U" was selected as the album's second singles in Canada and the United States, "Afrodisiac" was first released as Afrodisiac's second international single in France on September 22, 2004. Both the CD single and maxi single spawned two previously unreleased tracks, including Timbaland-produced "Sirens" and a solo version of "Talk About Our Love". In the United Kingdom, a DVD single was released, which additionally featured music videos of the latter and "Afrodisiac", as well as a making of and a digital photo gallery. Commercially, "Afrodisiac" was as somewhat equally successful as "Talk About Our Love" on the charts. It reached its highest peak on the UK Singles Chart, where it debuted at number eleven. "Afrodisiac" reached the top thirty in France and Ireland, where it reached number twenty-five and twenty-two respectively and became Norwood's highest-charting single since "Full Moon" (2002). In addition, it charted within the top forty on the ARIA Charts in Australia and the Swiss Singles Chart. While the song failed to chart in Germany, it reached number one on the component Black Music Chart.

== Music video ==
Norwood in "Afrodisiac" (2004).

The music video for "Afrodisiac" was directed by American photographer Matthew Rolston. It marked his second collaboration with Norwood following their 1995 video for "Best Friend". Entirely shot in a filming studio in Los Angeles, California in the summer of 2004, it was filmed over thirteen hours. Canadian creative director Laurieann Gibson, then best known for her work on MTV's Making the Band series, served as its choreographer. Gibson noted that Norwood was "performing groundbreaking moves" in the clip, which involved the design of a personal dance routine. Norwood declared Rolston's visuals as a "crazy performance-entertaining video."

The plotless video concept was developed during a single video conference with all involved parties. Inspired by the song itself, Rolston decided to visualize the sung-about afrodisiac as a liquid, eventually arranging the construction of a water-flooded "outtrack world" that depicts Norwood and her dancers performing in an ankle-deep basin and in front of water-reflecting walls respectively. With a view to create a "very simple video", styles and clothes are mainly influenced by white, gold and black color. Actor Columbus Short appeared as one of the background dancers in the video.

== Track listings ==
Maxi single
No.	Title	Writer(s)	Producer(s)	Length
1.	"Afrodisiac" (Album Version)	Kenisha Pratt; Kenneth Pratt; Isaac Phillips; Timothy Mosley	Timbaland; Brandy Norwood^{[a]}	3:47
2.	"Sirens"	Steve Garrett; Mosley	Timbaland; Norwood^{[a]}	3:59
3.	"Talk About Our Love" (TKC Club Mix)	Harold Lilly; Kanye West; Claude Cave II; Carlos Wilson; Louis Wilson; Ricardo Wilson	West; Norwood^{[a]}; Chris Staropoli^{[b]}	7:59

French CD single
No.	Title	Writer(s)	Producer(s)	Length
1.	"Afrodisiac" (Album Version)	Kenisha Pratt; Kenneth Pratt; Phillips; Mosley	Timbaland; Norwood^{[a]}	3:47
2.	"Sirens"	Garrett; Mosley	Timbaland; Norwood^{[a]}	3:59

UK CD single
No.	Title	Writer(s)	Producer(s)	Length
1.	"Afrodisiac" (Album Version)	Kenisha Pratt; Kenneth Pratt; Phillips; Mosley	Timbaland; Norwood^{[a]}	3:47
2.	"Talk About Our Love" (E-Smoove Classic Club Mix)	Lilly; West; Cave; C. Wilson; L. Wilson; R. Wilson	West; Norwood^{[a]}; E-Smoove^{[b]}	7:14

Notes

- ^{^[a]} denotes vocal producer
- ^{^[b]} denotes additional producer

== Credits and personnel ==
Credits lifted from the liner notes of Afrodisiac.

- Demacio "Demo" Castellón – assistant engineer
- Jimmy Douglass – engineering, mixing
- Blake English – engineering, vocal assistance
- Chris Gehringer – mastering
- Jeremal Hicks – assistant engineer
- Brandy Norwood – vocal producer, vocals
- Isaac Phillips – writer
- Kenisha Pratt – vocal assistance, writer
- Kenneth Pratt – vocal assistance, writer
- Halsey Quemere – assistant engineer
- Timbaland – producer

== Charts ==
=== Weekly charts ===
Weekly chart performance for "Afrodisiac"
Chart (2004–2005)	Peak position
Australia (ARIA)	31
France (SNEP)	25
Germany Black Music (Media Control GfK)	1
Ireland (IRMA)	22
Scottish Singles Sales (Official Charts)	23
Switzerland (Schweizer Hitparade)	36
UK Singles (Official Charts)	11
UK Hip Hop/R&B (Official Charts)	1

=== Year-end charts ===
Year-end chart performance for "Afrodisiac"
Chart (2004)	Position
Germany Black Music (Media Control GfK)	18

== Release history ==
Release dates and formats for "Afrodisiac"
Region	Date	Format(s)	Label(s)	Ref.
France	September 22, 2004	CD	Warner Music	
Germany	September 24, 2004	Maxi	Warner Music	
United Kingdom	October 4, 2004	CD	Atlantic	
Australia	October 25, 2004	CD	Warner Music	
