= El Chapo (song) =

Single by The Game and Skrillex

from the album The Documentary 2.5
- Released: October 9, 2015
- Genre: Hip hop; trap; Gangsta rap
- Length: 3:40
- Label: Blood Money; eOne
- Songwriters: Jayceon Taylor; Sonny Moore; Shondrae Crawford
- Producers: Mr. Bangladesh; Skrillex; Nastradomas

The Game singles chronology
"100" (2015)	"El Chapo" (2015)	"All Eyez" (2016)

Skrillex singles chronology
"Where Are Ü Now" (2015)	"El Chapo" (2015)	"To Ü" (2015)

"El Chapo" is the second single by American rapper The Game with American electronic music producer and DJ Skrillex, taken from his sixth studio album, The Documentary 2.5. The song features production by Mr. Bangladesh, Skrillex, and Nastradomas. The song's title references El Chapo.

== Certifications ==
Region	Certification	Certified units/sales
New Zealand (RMNZ)	Platinum	30,000^{‡}
United States (RIAA)	Gold	500,000^{‡}
^{‡} Sales+streaming figures based on certification alone.

== Charts ==
Chart (2015)	Peak position
US Bubbling Under R&B/Hip-Hop Singles (Billboard)	7
