= The Documentary 2.5 =

Studio album by the Game
- Released: October 16, 2015
- Recorded: 2014–2015
- Studios: Record Room Studios (Miami, Florida); Chalice Recording Studios (Hollywood, California)
- Genres: West Coast hip hop; gangsta rap
- Length: 73:50
- Labels: Blood Money; Fifth Amendment; eOne
- Producers: The Game; Stat Quo; Cash "Wack100" Jones; the Alchemist; Mr. Bangladesh; Battlecat; Bongo; Cool & Dre; DJ Khalil; DJ Mustard; DJ Quik; Fredwreck; Mike & Keys; G Koop; Kevin Bivona; Nastradomas; S1; Skrillex; THX; Tone Mason; Travis Barker; will.i.am

The Game chronology
The Documentary 2 (2015)	The Documentary 2.5 (2015)	Streets of Compton (2016)

Singles from The Documentary 2.5
- 1. "El Chapo" Released: October 9, 2015

The Documentary 2.5 is the seventh studio album by American rapper The Game. It was released on October 16, 2015, by Blood Money Entertainment, Fifth Amendment Entertainment, and eOne Music. The album is the second half for the two-piece project that was divided from the first half of his seventh album The Documentary 2 (2015), which was released a week earlier. The album features guest appearances from will.i.am, Schoolboy Q, Jay Rock, Nas, DJ Quik, Busta Rhymes and Problem, among others. The album was supported by the single: "El Chapo" with Skrillex. A sequel to both albums, The Documentary III, was released on August 21, 2026.

== Singles ==
The lead single from The Documentary 2.5, "El Chapo" was released on October 9, 2015. The song features a duet and additional vocals from disc jockey Skrillex, who also produced this track, alongside Mr. Bangladesh and Nastradomas.

== Critical reception ==
Professional ratings
Aggregate scores
Source	Rating
Metacritic	79/100
Review scores
Source	Rating
Allmusic	4/5 stars
Billboard	4.5/5 stars
NOW	4/5 stars
RapReviews	9/10
HipHopDX	4/5 stars
Zumic	4.5/5 stars

The Documentary 2.5 received widespread acclaim from contemporary music critics. At Metacritic, which assigns a normalized rating out of 100 to reviews from mainstream critics, the album received an average score of 79, which indicates "generally favorable reviews", based on 6 reviews.

== Commercial performance ==
The Documentary 2.5 debuted at number six on the US Billboard 200 with 48,000 album-equivalent units, which included 42,000 pure album sales. It serves as the Game's eighth top-ten album in the United States. The album dropped to the number 29 in its second week, earning an additional 15,000 album-equivalent units. As of November 2015, The Documentary 2.5 had accumulated 63,000 album-equivalent units in the United States, with 54,000 being pure sales.

== Track listing ==
No.	Title	Writer(s)	Producer(s)	Length
1.	"New York Skit"	Jayceon Taylor; Stanley Benton	Stat Quo; The Game	2:34
2.	"Magnus Carlsen" (featuring Anderson .Paak)	Taylor; Brandon Paak; Uforo Ebong	Bongo	5:29
3.	"Crenshaw / 80s and Cocaine" (featuring Anderson .Paak and Sonyae)	Taylor; Farid Nassar; Paak; Chris "THX" Goodman	Fredwreck; THX	4:35
4.	"Gang Bang Anyway" (featuring Jay Rock and Schoolboy Q)	Taylor; Johnny McKinzie, Jr.; Quincy Hanley; Ebong	Bongo	5:05
5.	"The Ghetto" (featuring Nas and will.i.am)	Taylor; Nasir Jones; William Adams, Jr.	will.i.am	6:01
6.	"From Adam" (featuring Lil Wayne)	Taylor; Dwayne Carter, Jr.; Marcello Valenzano; Andre Lyon	Cool & Dre	3:45
7.	"Gang Related" (featuring Asia Bryant)	Taylor; Asia Bryant; Ebong	Bongo	4:09
8.	"Last Time You Seen" (featuring Scarface and Stacy Barthe)	Taylor; Brad Jordan; Stacy Barthe; Larry Griffin, Jr.; Robert Mandell	S1; G Koop	3:50
9.	"Intoxicated" (featuring Dion)	Taylor; Dion Jenkins; Khalil Abdul-Rahman	DJ Khalil	3:04
10.	"Quik's Groove (The One)" (featuring DJ Quik, Sevyn Streeter and Micah)	Taylor; David Blake; Amber Streeter; Micah Powell	DJ Quik	5:41
11.	"Outside" (featuring E-40, Mvrcus Blvck and Lil E)	Taylor; Earl Stevens; Black; Travis Barker; Eric Darnell Wright; Kevin Bivona	Travis Barker; Kevin Bivona	4:00
12.	"Up on the Wall" (featuring Problem, Ty Dolla $ign and YG)	Taylor; Jason Martin; Tyrone Griffin, Jr.; Keenon Jackson; Kevin Gilliam	Battlecat	5:05
13.	"Sex Skit"	Taylor; Ebong	Bongo	2:51
14.	"My Flag / Da Homies" (featuring Ty Dolla $ign, Jay305, AD, Mitchy Slick, Joe Moses, RJ and Skeme)	Taylor; Griffin Jr.; Jay Cummings; Charles Mitchell; Joseph Moses; Armand Douglas; Rodney Brown, Jr.; Lonnie Kimble; Dijon McFarlane	DJ Mustard	6:37
15.	"Moment of Violence" (featuring King Mez, JT and Jon Connor)	Taylor; Morris Ricks II; Jon Freeman, Jr.; Justin Mohrle; John Groover; Michael Cox, Jr.; Abdul-Rahman	Mike & Keys; DJ Khalil	3:22
16.	"Like Father, Like Son 2" (featuring Busta Rhymes)	Taylor; Trevor Smith, Jr.; Alan Maman	The Alchemist	4:44
17.	"Life"	Taylor; Anthony McIntyre	Tone Mason	2:58
18.	"El Chapo" (with Skrillex)	Taylor	Skrillex; Bangladesh	3:40
Total length:				77:48

Notes

- "Moment of Violence" contains uncredited vocals performed by Elijah Blake.
- "Like Father, Like Son 2" contains additional vocals performed by Harlem Caron Taylor and King Justice Taylor.
- Adam Turchin — saxophone's
- Koofreh Umoren — trumpet
- Travis Barker — drums (track 3)

Sample credits

- "Magnus Carlsen" contains samples of "Rocket Love" performed by Stevie Wonder.
- "Crenshaw / 80s and Cocaine" contains samples of "Power of Soul" performed by Idris Muhammed, and "Blow Your Head" performed by Fred Wesley and the J.B.s.
- "The Ghetto" contains samples of "Tower Of Power" performed by Sparkling in the Sand.
- "From Adam" contains samples of "Who Made You Go" performed by Faith, Hope & Charity.
- "Up on the Wall" contains samples of "Get Down on It", written by James "J.T." Taylor, Ronald Bell, performed by Kool & the Gang.
- "Like Father, Like Son 2" contains samples of "Like Father, Like Son" performed by the Game.
- "Life" contains samples of "You Give Good Love" performed by Whitney Houston, and an interpolation of "Some How Some Way" performed by Jay Z.
- "El Chapo" contains samples of "Granada" performed by Frank Sinatra.

== Charts ==
=== Weekly charts ===
Chart (2015)	Peak position
Belgian Albums (Ultratop Flanders)	80
Canadian Albums (Billboard)	8
Dutch Albums (Album Top 100)	89
French Albums (SNEP)	86
German Albums (GfK Entertainment)	45
Irish Albums (IRMA)	32
New Zealand Albums (RMNZ)	24
Swiss Albums (Schweizer Hitparade)	20
UK Albums (Official Charts)	23
UK R&B Albums (Official Charts)	3
US Billboard 200	6
US Independent Albums (Billboard)	1
US Top Rap Albums (Billboard)	2
US Top R&B/Hip-Hop Albums (Billboard)	2

=== Year-end charts ===
Chart (2015)	Peak position
US Independent Albums (Billboard)	32
US Top R&B/Hip-Hop Albums (Billboard)	69
