= Should I Go =

Song by Brandy

from the album Afrodisiac
- Recorded: 2003
- Studio: Hit Factory Criteria (Miami)
- Genre: R&B; pop
- Length: 4:56
- Label: Atlantic
- Songwriter(s): Walter Millsap; Candice Nelson; Timothy Mosley; Guy Berryman; Jonny Buckland; Will Champion; Chris Martin
- Producer(s): Timbaland

"Should I Go" is a song by American recording artist Brandy Norwood from her fourth studio album, Afrodisiac (2004). It was written by Walter Millsap III, his collaborative partner Candice Nelson, and mentor Timbaland, while production was helmed by the latter. "Should I Go" is built on percussive beats, syncopated handclaps and a piano riff that samples British alternative rock band Coldplay's song "Clocks", written by Guy Berryman, Jonny Buckland, Will Champion, and Chris Martin for their second album, A Rush of Blood to the Head (2002). Lyrically, Norwood as the protagonist openly talks about contemplating stepping away from the music business, admitting that she is trying to figure out where she fits in today.

== Background ==
In June 2002, Norwood gave birth to her daughter Sy'rai. Soon, she resumed work on her then-untitled fourth studio album with producer Mike City and companion Robert "Big Bert" Smith, the latter of which served as the album's executive producer and A&R. He replaced longtime contributor and mentor Rodney "Darkchild" Jerkins, who Norwood felt was not going in the same direction creatively after all, and kept her from exploring her "versatility, [her] creativity and [her] art." The couple eventually finished a number of demo recordings and at least four full songs until late November 2002, and although Smith expected the album to drop by spring 2003 at one time or another, Norwood and Big Bert ended their relationship in mid-2003, resulting in the album's delay and several personnel changes. Norwood eventually decided to scrap most of the project, and instead enlisted rapper Timbaland, with whom the couple had previously worked on Kiley Dean's Simple Girl album, as the album's main contributor. Impressed by Timbaland's input, Norwood rediscovered the musical affection, she had missed on previous album Full Moon.

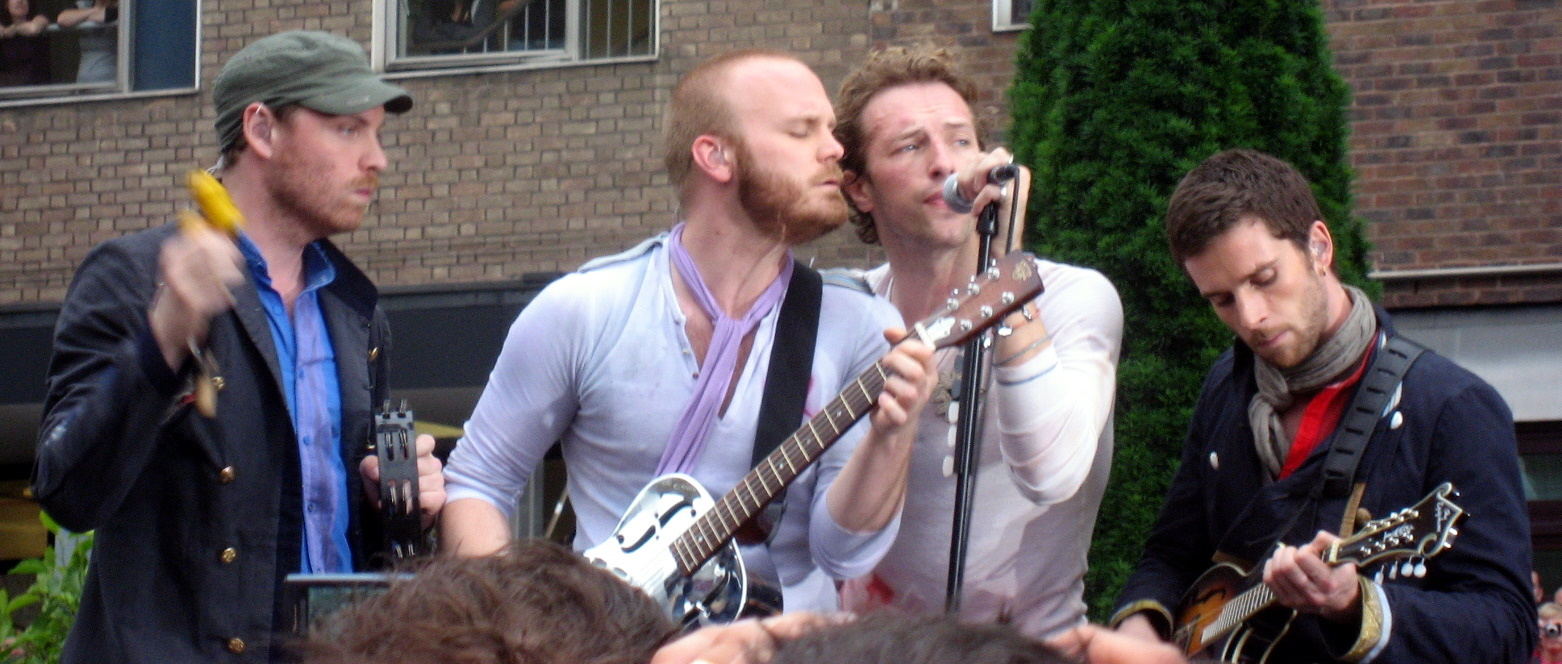
As with other tracks on Afrodisiac, "Should I Go" was largely inspired by British alternative rock band Coldplay.

Timbaland consulted his protégé Walter Millsap III and writing partner Candice Nelson to work with him on the bulk of Norwood's fourth album. Many of the themes and musical styles of their records were inspired by British alternative rock band Coldplay's debut album Parachutes (2000) which Nelson had just started listening to at the time. Conceived after the production of "I Tried" which samples Coldplay's "Sparks", "Should I Go" was written along a backing track Timbaland had produced around "Clocks", another Coldplay song from their second album A Rush of Blood to the Head. Impressed with Millsap and Nelson's knowledge of the British band, he played them the music he had crafted prior to recording sessions for Afrodisiac. The pair took it to the car, driving around while listening to it.

The development of "Should I Go" was motivated by the idea of what Millsap and Nelson imagined Norwood might feel at times and in the business as it was constantly changing. On the accompanying writing process, Nelson commented that "it was like 'What else does Brandy feel besides love and all that? What else might be going through her mind?' That’s what we came up with. She had already been in the business for awhile and she had put out a few albums, so it was like 'What might somebody at that point in their career been thinking?'" Upon hearing the demo, Norwood felt shocked but could relate to its topic. Her vocals were recorded at The Hit Factory Criteria in Miami, Florida and Amerycan Recording Studios, Los Angeles, California, with production overseen by herself. Timbaland and Jimmy Douglass mixed the track, while Douglass, Blake English, Demacio Castellon, Jeremal Hicks, and Halsey Quemere all assisted in the audio engineering of the track.

== Composition ==
"Should I Go" is a downtempo R&B and pop ballad, that displays influences of dream pop and alternative rock. Built around a repeating melody, it features a minimalist soundscape of bluesy guitar and syncopated hand claps, while incorporating a cascading piano arpeggio that samples from the instrumental break of Coldplay's 2002 song "Clocks". The song itself was inspired by the English rock band Muse, and penned by band members Guy Berryman, Jonny Buckland, Will Champion, and Chris Martin.

"Should I Go" features the female protagonist wondering aloud whether it's worth bothering with the bureaucracy of the music industry when she is not even sure it's part of her long-term goals. These interpretations are shown in the lines: "Should I Go? / Should I Stay? / I'm In Control / Either Way". Murmuring about her career concerns, Norwood sings "I'm standing on the edge of the industry / Wondering if it’s all that important to me / To get my records back out there on the street again / This game ain’t what I’m used to". Norwood also alludes to the late 1990s when she dominated female urban contemporary with other female teen singers such as Aaliyah and Monica and she felt that the "Industry was more like a different world." Vocally, the song concludes with intricately layered vocal harmonies with Norwood dropping the chorus a cappella at the end.

== Critical reception ==
Slant Magazine's Sal Cinquemani ranked "Should I Go" among Afrodisiac's highlights and commented that the song sounded like a "shout-out to the band it's become excruciatingly cool to say you like." David Browne from Entertainment Weekly found that while "Coldplay fixation reaches critical mass" on the song, the results of sampling "Clocks" were "still pretty striking, almost theatrical. The song [...] reminds you that a dose of over-the-top melodrama can be good for pop, R&B, or any genre." In his review for Allmusic, Andy Kellman concluded that "Should I Go" was "about as honest and searching as anyone gets these days, and while it's also noteworthy for allowing Brandy and Timbaland to pay tribute to shared love Coldplay, it's the music industry that's being contemplated, not a romantic relationship. Whatever Brandy decides to do, consider her mark made."

Less enthusiastic with the track, Terry Sawyers from PopMatters commented that "Should I Go" sounded "exhausted and porously dull", and that "without the punch up of a good backbeat, Brandy can drift and drain, melting into the song without making more than a breeze of an impression [...] despite the limp handclaps, which seem placed more to keep you awake than to actually support the song." Andy Battaglia of The A.V. Club wrote that the song "floats over a clunky sample [...] that goes nowhere" and added that the song showed "Brandy in her best and worst form: Unmoored as a musical presence, she sounds most at home in pop-R&B clothes that would seem to make her one of many stars that twinkle more than shine." Stylus Magazine's Josh Love called the song a "rarity in Brandy’s catalogue", while Keya Modessa from The Situation declared it a "spectacular close." Kitty Empire, writing for The Observer, remarked that "Timbaland samples great swaths of Coldplay's "Clocks" on the splendid, soul-searching "Should I Go"." Billboard magazine summed the track as "gorgeous" and found that it demanded repeated plays.

== Credits and personnel ==
Credits adapted from the liner notes of Afrodisiac.

- Vocals – Brandy Norwood
- Vocal production – Brandy Norwood
- Vocal assistance – Blake English, Kenisha Pratt
- Engineering – Jimmy Douglass, Blake English
- Engineering assistance - Demo Castellon, Jermeal Hicks
- Mixing – Timbaland, Jimmy Douglass
- Mixing assistance – Halsey Quemere
- Mastering – Chris Gerhinger
