= Kenisha Pratt =

American musical artist (1980–2019)

- Born: Kenisha LaCarol Pratt; February 13, 1980
- Died: December 19, 2019 (aged 39)
- Occupations: Songwriter; vocal producer

Kenisha LaCarol Pratt (February 13, 1980 – December 19, 2019) was an American songwriter and vocal producer, known for her songwriting credits on songs by artists such as Brandy, Toni Braxton, TLC, Yahzarah, Burhan G and Hadise, and her brother K-Young.

== Career ==
Pratt, the daughter of LaCarol Pratt-Miles and Phillip Miles, was the older sister of Kenneth "K-Young" Pratt, songwriter and lead singer of R&B group 3rd Storee, and Keana Pratt. The siblings were raised in Inglewood, California. The recipient of a full music scholarship from guitarist Tommy Tedesco, Pratt received her degree from the Musicians Institute in Los Angeles, California. In the late 1990s, she ventured into professional songwriting under the tutelage of music producer Rodney "Darkchild" Jerkins with whom she worked on Michael Jackson's album Invincible (2001) and TLC's 3D (2002).

The following year, she co-wrote several songs on Jerkins' regular collaborator Brandy's third studio album Full Moon, including lead single "What About Us?" for which Pratt was awarded a BMI Citation of Achievement Award the following year. Pratt would become a frequent collaborator on Brandy's subsequent projects Afrodisiac (2004) and Sweet Nothings (intended for release in 2007), apart from working with her on tracks which they co-wrote for other artists such as Toni Braxton. In addition, Pratt co-wrote the majority of her brother's solo debut album Learn How to Love, released in 2005, and was consulted by producers such as Mike City, Soulshock & Karlin, Bink!, Cool & Dre, Bryan Michael Cox, and Timbaland.

== Death ==
In January 2020, K-Young took to Instagram to announce that his sister had died on December 19, 2019, at the age of 39.

== Songwriting credits ==
- Brandy – "Anybody", "Apart", "I Wanna Fall In Love", "Nothing", "When You Touch Me", "WOW", "What About Us?" (Full Moon; 2002)
- TLC – "Over Me" (3D; 2002)
- Toni Braxton – "Always", "Selfish" (More Than a Woman; 2002)
- Yahzarah – "One Day" (Blackstar; 2003)
- Toni Braxton – "Whatchu Need" (Ultimate Toni Braxton; 2003)
- Brandy – "Afrodisiac", Sadiddy" (Afrodisiac; 2004)
- Hadise – "Bad Boy" (Sweat; 2005)
- K-Young – Learn How to Love (2005)
- Mimi Terrell – "Give It to Me" (It's Mimi; 2005)
- Booty Luv – "A Little Bit" (Boogie 2nite; 2007)
- Burhan G – "Can't Let U Go", "This Is Our World" (Breakout; 2007)
- Li Yuchun – "My Kingdom" (Mine; 2007)
- Sibel – "I'm Sorry" (The Diving Belle; 2008)
