= Deutsche Urban Charts =

Deutsche Urban Charts (DUC), formerly also known by various names including Deutsche Black Charts (DBC) and Deutsche Hip Hop/R&B/Dancehall Singles, is a German chart released weekly by Deutsche Trend Charts (owned by Public Music & Media Ltd. and issued and marketed in Hamburg). The charts are widely broadcast and published in various print magazines, radio, on TV and many Internet websites in Germany.

Initiated in 2001, it is the most important black music chart in Germany and is used to track the success of popular music songs in urban venues. The chart is dominated by contemporary R&B, rap and hip-hop. It lists the most popular R&B, dancehall, rap and hip-hop songs, calculated weekly by airplay on rhythmic and urban radio stations and sales in urban record stores and dance club play. For the German music industry and trade, they have grown into a respected and vital yardstick of this specific music genre since its formation and have found a high level of recognition among DJs and young consumers of these styles of music. A song is able to chart for a maximum of ten weeks before they become a "drop out", allowing new releases to debut in following weeks.
