= List of songs recorded by Brandy =

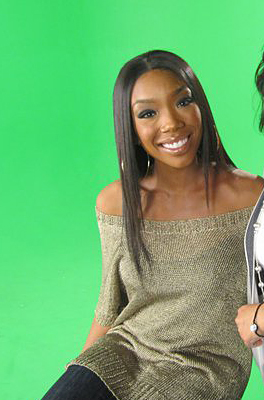
Norwood filming for her reality show Brandy & Ray J: A Family Business, 2011

American singer Brandy Norwood has recorded songs for her eight studio albums and has collaborated with other artists for duets and featured songs on their respective albums and charity singles. After signing a record contract with Atlantic in 1993, Norwood began to work with producers Keith Crouch and R&B group Somethin' for the People, who co-wrote and co-produced most of the songs on her 1994 debut album, Brandy. Musician Robin Thicke co-wrote the ballad "Love Is on My Side", while actor and singer Rahsaan Patterson co-wrote the album's second singles "Baby". Rodney "Darkchild" Jerkins and his team co-wrote and co-produced 10 songs out of 16 on Norwood's second album Never Say Never (1998). The album's lead single "The Boy Is Mine" was written by Norwood, Jerkins, LaShawn Daniels, Fred Jerkins III, and Joana Tejeda, while second single "Have You Ever?" was co-penned by Award-winning songwriter Diane Warren.

Norwood reteamed with Jerkins to work on her third studio album Full Moon (2002), for which he again co-wrote and co-produced 10 songs for the standard version, including lead single "What About Us?". Different writers and producers, including Warryn Campbell, Uncle Freddie, Big Bert, and Mike City significantly contributed to the album, the latter of which wrote and produced the album's title track. Norwood's fourth album Afrodisiac (2004) marked a departure from her previous work with Jerkins, who gained no credit on the album due to a disagreement on Norwood's decision to work with Timbaland and his protégé, Walter Millsap III, on the majority of the production of the album. Timbaland composed eleven tracks for the album, including singles "Afrodisiac", "Who Is She 2 U", and buzz single Turn It Up", while rapper Kanye West and Harold Lilly co-wrote the album's lead single "Talk About Our Love".

Norwood's fifth studio album Human, her first album on Epic Records, saw the singer returning to Jerkins, who co-wrote and produced eight songs on it, including both singles "Right Here (Departed)" and "Long Distance", the latter of which was co-written by fellow singer-songwriter Bruno Mars. Other contributors included Canadian musician Esthero, British singer Natasha Bedingfield, and American singer-songwriter Frank Ocean. Two Eleven, Norwood's sixth studio album and first release on RCA Records, presented a new creative direction for the singer as she decided to include a diverse roster of collaborators. Sean Garrett, Chris Brown, Rico Love, and Bangladesh produced tracks for the album, as well as Mike WiLL Made It, and Mario Winans. For her seventh studio album, B7, her first project in nearly a decade and her debut on her own label, Brand Nu, Inc., in partnership with Entertainment One, Norwood collaborated closely with Darhyl Camper on much of the material. In June 2022, she signed with Motown Records and began work on her first holiday album, Christmas with Brandy, with production largely overseen by Theron Feemster.

== Released songs ==
=== As a main artist ===
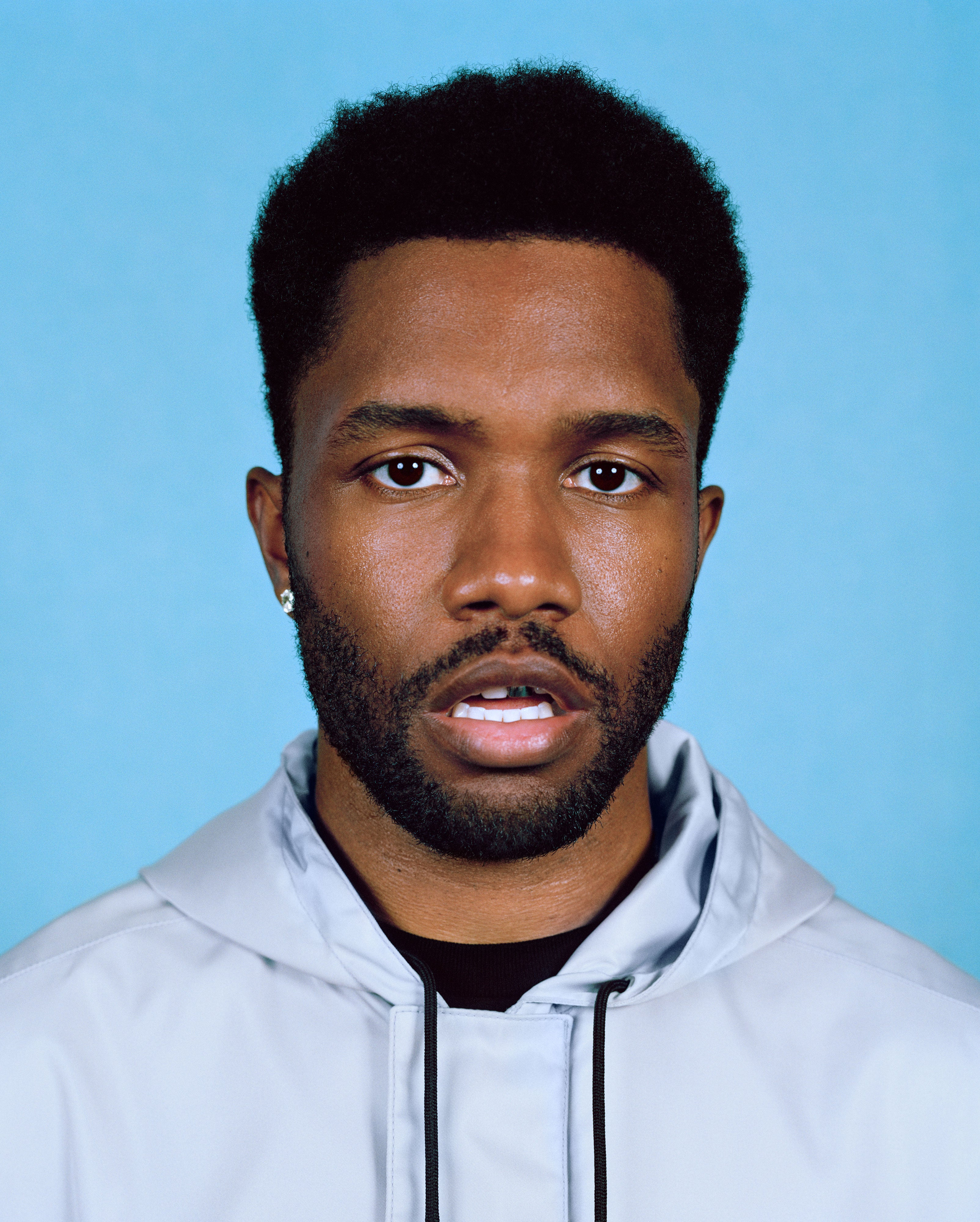
Frank Ocean co-wrote "1st & Love", the first of several collaborations with Norwood.

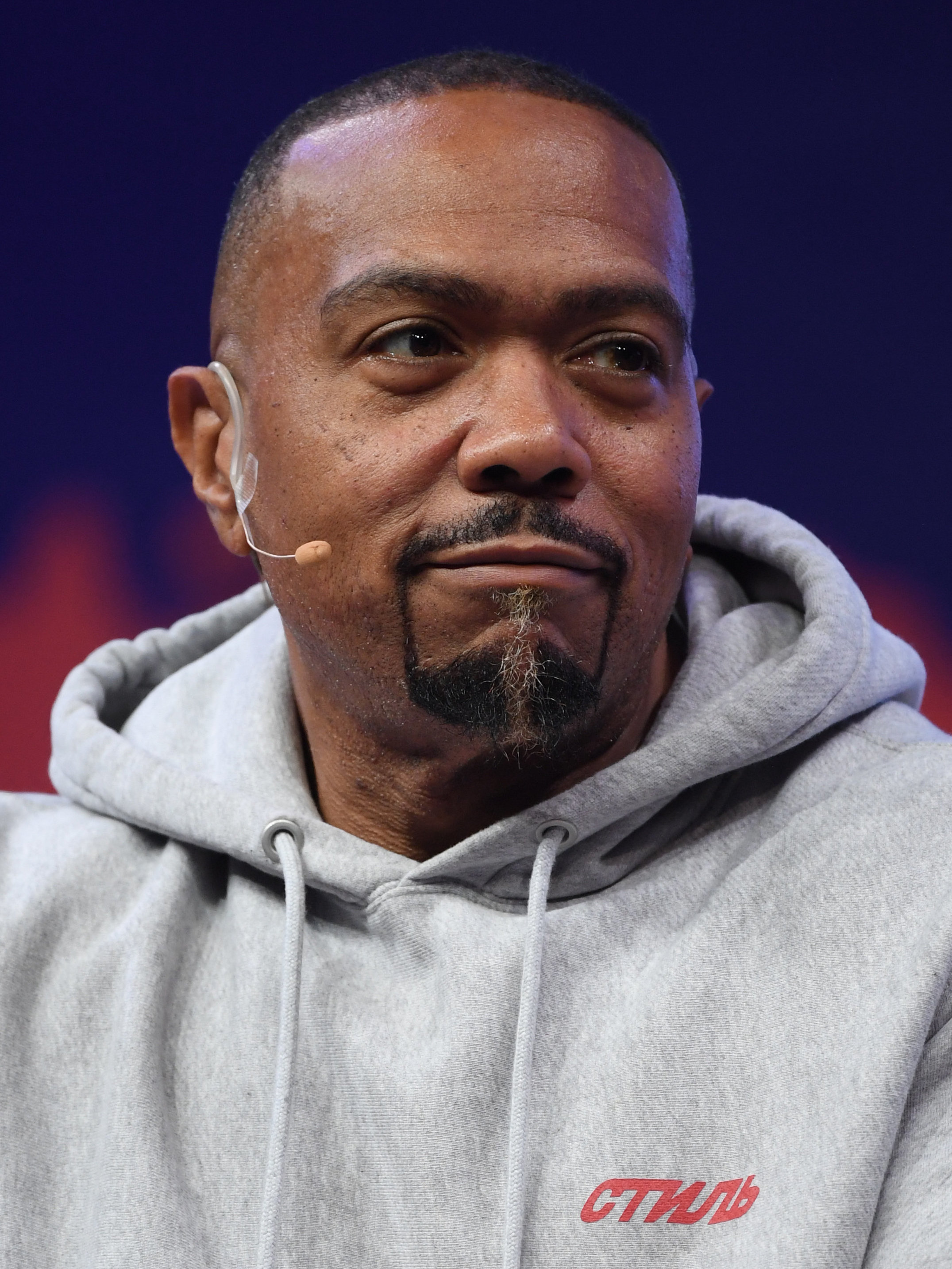
Timbaland produced most of Norwood's fourth album Afrodisiac, including its pop-driven title track.

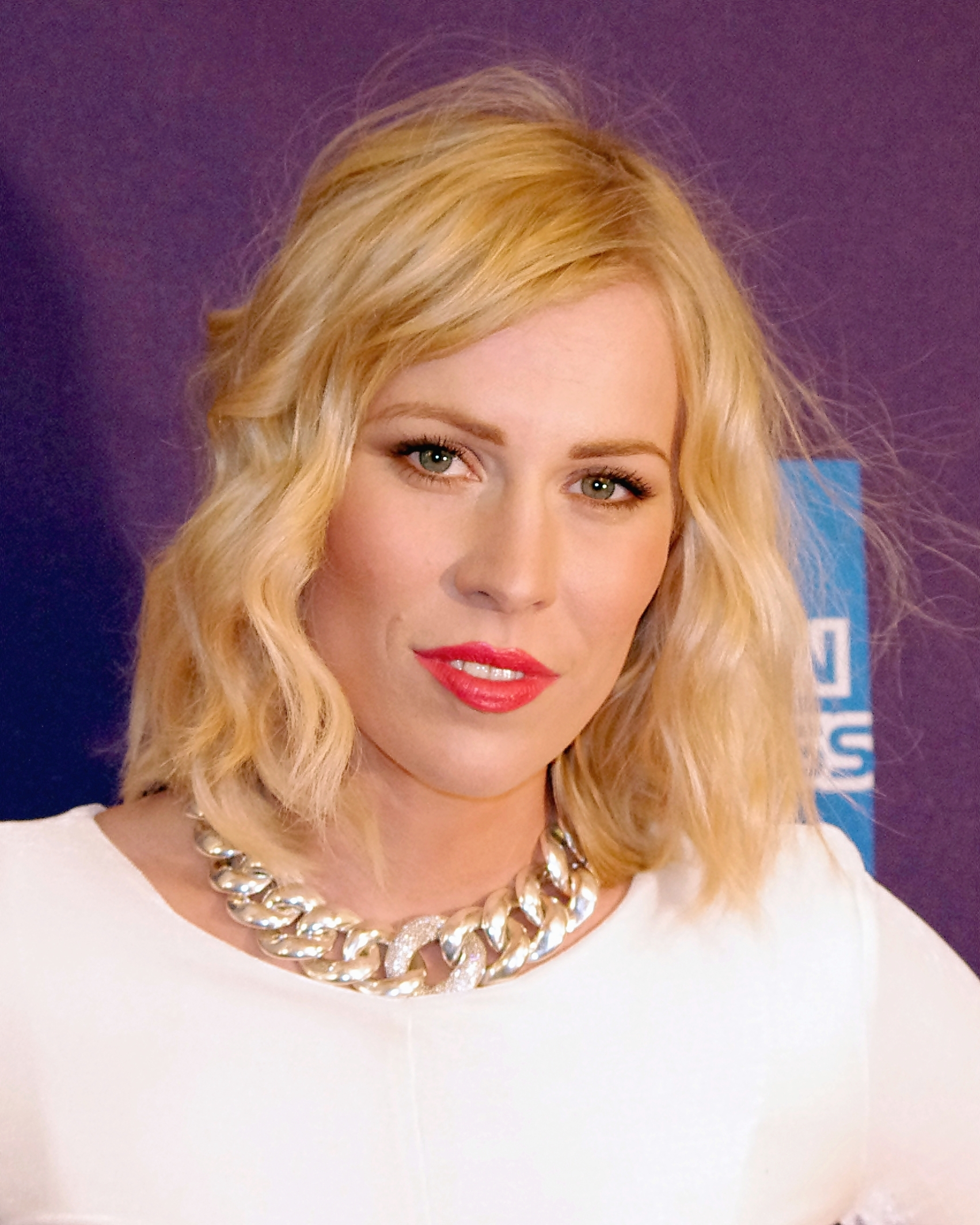
British singer-songwriter Natasha Bedingfield co-wrote the ballad song "Fall" on Human.

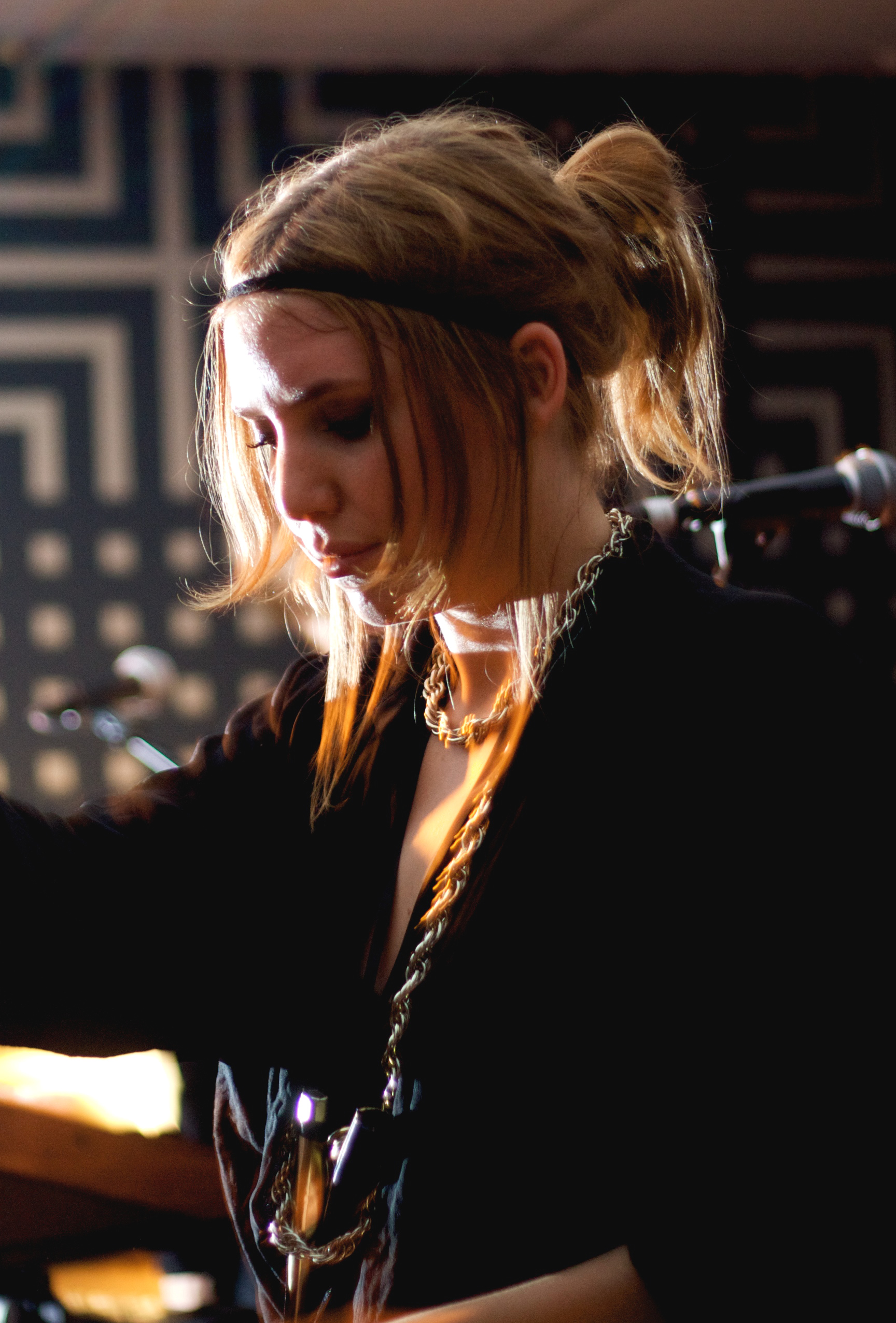
"Let Me Go" contains a sample of Lykke Li's song "Tonight". Due to the inclusion of the sample, Li received co-writing credits.

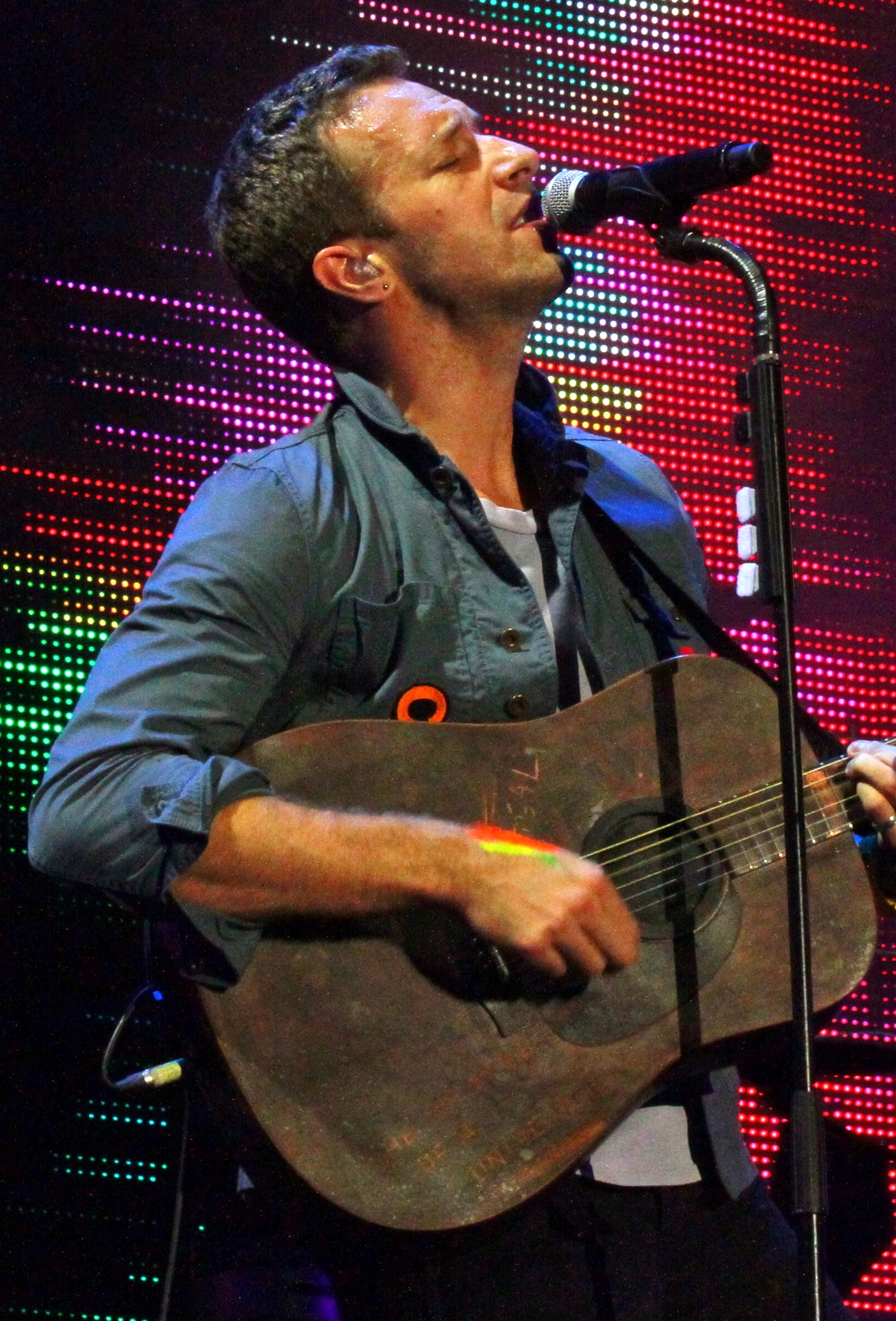
"I Tried" and "Should I Go" interpolate songs from British band Coldplay. Due to the interpolation, front singer Chris Martin received co-writing credits.

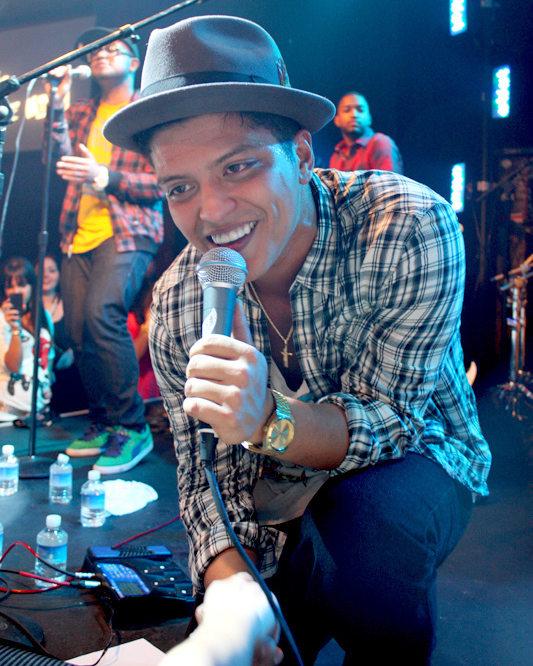
Bruno Mars co-wrote the song "Long Distance" and contributed backing vocals.

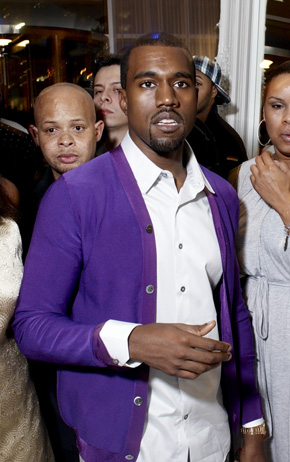
Kanye West co-wrote and produced "Talk About Our Love" and appeared as a featured vocalist in 2004.

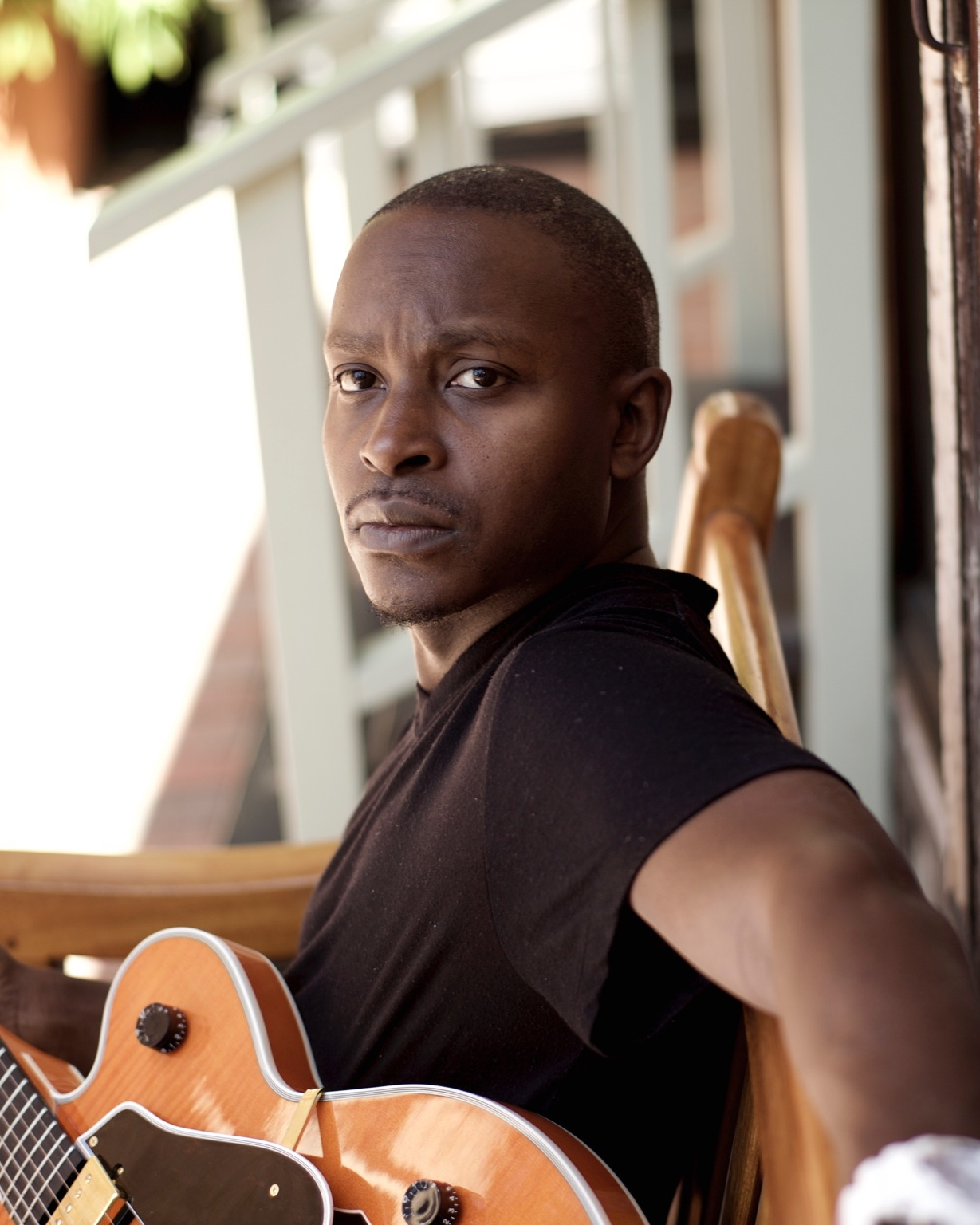
Theron "Neff-U" Feemster co-wrote and produced the majority of Christmas with Brandy (2023).

| Song | Artist(s) | Writer(s) | Album(s) | Year | Ref. |
|---|---|---|---|---|---|
| "1st & Love" | Brandy | Chauncey Hollis; Rich King; Christopher Breaux; Jesse Woodard | Human | 2008 | |
| "A Capella (Something's Missing)" | Brandy | Kenneth Charles Coby; Chad C. Roper; LeChe D. Martin; Tiyon Mack | Human | 2008 | |
| "A Family Business" | Brandy, Ray J, Willie & Sonja Norwood | Brandy Norwood; Willie Norwood, Jr. A. Aiken; C. Ross; Willie Norwood, Sr. | A Family Business | 2011 | |
| "A Love Shared" | Willie Norwood featuring Brandy & Kirk Whalum | Cedric Caldwell; Victor Caldwell; Winans | Bout It | 2001 | |
| "A Lovely Night" | Brandy with Bernadette Peters & Veanne Cox | Richard Rodgers; Oscar Hammerstein II | Cinderella | 1997 | |
| "Afrodisiac" | Brandy | Isaac Phillips; Kenisha Pratt; Kenneth Pratt; Tim Mosley | Afrodisiac | 2004 | |
| "All I Need" | Brandy | James Foye; Tiffany Fred; Breana Marin; Austin Owens; Marcos Palacios | Star (Season 3) | 2018 | |
| "All in Me" | Brandy | LaShawn Daniels; Fred Jerkins III; Rodney Jerkins | Full Moon | 2002 | |
| "All My Life (Part I–III)" | Brandy | Darhyl Camper, Jr. Akil "Fresh" King; Kim "Kaydence" Krysiuk; Brandy Norwood | B7 | 2020 | |
| "Almost Doesn't Count" | Brandy | Guy Roche; Shelly Peiken | Never Say Never | 1998 | |
| "Always on My Mind" | Brandy | Kenneth Crouch | Brandy | 1994 | |
| "Angel in Disguise" | Brandy | LaShawn Daniels; Traci Hale; Fred Jerkins III; Rodney Jerkins; Nycolia "Tye-V" Turman; Joseph Lewis Thomas | Never Say Never | 1998 | |
| "Another Day in Paradise" | Brandy & Ray J | Phill Collins | Urban Renewal | 2001 | |
| "Anybody" | Brandy | LaShawn Daniels; Fred Jerkins III; Rodney Jerkins; Brandy Norwood; Kenisha Pratt | Full Moon | 2002 | |
| "Apart" | Brandy | Keith Crouch; Kenisha Pratt | Full Moon | 2002 | |
| "As Long As You're Here" | Brandy | Rochad Holiday; Trina Powell; Curtis "Sauce" Wilson; Jeffrey Young | Brandy | 1994 | |
| "B-Rocka Intro" | Brandy | LaShawn Daniels; Fred Jerkins III; Rodney Jerkins; Nora Payne; Kenisha Pratt | Full Moon | 2002 | |
| "Baby" | Brandy | Keith Crouch; Kipper Jones; Rahsaan Patterson | Brandy | 1994 | |
| "Baby Mama" | Brandy featuring Chance the Rapper | Chancelor Bennett; Chauncey Hollis; Akil "Fresh" King; Kim "Kaydence" Krysiuk; Brandy Norwood; Sy'rai Smith | B7 | 2020 | |
| "Beginning Together" | Brandy | —N/a | Sesame Beginnings: Beginning Together | 2005 | |
| "Beggin & Pleadin" | Brandy | Ronald Colson; Warren Felder; John Lee Hooker; Kirby Lauryen; Steve Mostyn; Brandy Norwood; Andrew Wansel | non-album release | 2016 | |
| "Best Friend" | Brandy | Keith Crouch; Glenn McKinney | Brandy | 1994 | |
| "Borderline" | Brandy | Darhyl Camper, Jr. Al Sherrod Lambert; Kim "Kaydence" Krysiuk; Charles McAllister; Brandy Norwood | B7 | 2020 | |
| "Brokenhearted" | Brandy | Keith Crouch; Kipper Jones | Brandy | 1994 | |
| "Bye BiPolar" | Brandy | Darhyl Camper, Jr. Kim "Kaydence" Krysiuk; Brandy Norwood | B7 | 2020 | |
| "Camouflage" | Brandy | Dernst Emile; Claude Kelly | Human | 2008 | |
| "Can You Hear Me Now?" | Brandy | Richard Butler; Nathaniel Hills | Two Eleven | 2012 | |
| "Can We" | Brandy | LaShawn Daniels; Rodney Jerkins; Alex Greggs | Full Moon | 2002 | |
| "Christmas Everyday" | Brandy | Nasri Atweh; Adam Messinger | Christmas with Brandy | 2023 | |
| "Christmas Gift" | Brandy featuring Sy'rai | Theron Feemster; Sebastian Kole; Kyle Mann; Brandy Norwood; David Williams II | Christmas with Brandy | 2023 | |
| "Christmas Party for Two" | Brandy | Theron Feemster; Sebastian Kole; Brandy Norwood; David Williams II | Christmas with Brandy | 2023 | |
| "Come a Little Bit Closer" | Brandy | Stuart Brawley; Jason Derlatka | Full Moon | 2002 | |
| "Come As You Are" | Brandy | Steve "Static" Garrett; Tim Mosley | Afrodisiac | 2004 | |
| "Deck the Halls" | Brandy | Thomas Oliphant; John Thomas | Christmas with Brandy | 2023 | |
| "Die Without You" | Brandy featuring Ray J | Attrell Cordes | Full Moon | 2002 | |
| "Dig This" | Brandy | Eric Hudson; Johnta Austin | Meet the Browns | 2008 | |
| "Do I Love You Because You're Beautiful?" | Brandy with Paolo Montalban | Richard Rodgers; Oscar Hammerstein II | Cinderella | 1997 | |
| "Do You Know What You Have?" | Brandy | Sean Garrett; Brandy Norwood; Breyon Prescott; Pierre Slaughter; Michael Williams | Two Eleven | 2012 | |
| "(Everything I Do) I Do It for You" | Brandy | Bryan Adams; Michael Kamen; Robert John "Mutt" Lange | Never Say Never | 1998 | |
| "Fall" | Brandy | Brian Seals; Brandy Norwood; Natasha Bedingfield; LaShawn Daniels | Human | 2008 | |
| "Falling in Love with Love" | Brandy with Paolo Montalban | Richard Rodgers; Lorenz Hart | Cinderella | 1997 | |
| "Feels Different" | Brandy | Theron Feemster; Sebastian Kole; Brandy Norwood; David Williams II | Christmas with Brandy | 2023 | |
| "Finally" | Brandy | Walter Millsap III; Candice Nelson; Tim Mosley; Brandy Norwood; Hans Zimmer; Nick Glennie-Smith; Steven Stern; Don Harper | Afrodisiac | 2004 | |
| "Focus" | Brandy | Walter Millsap III; Candice Nelson; Tim Mosley; Isaac Phillip | Afrodisiac | 2004 | |
| "Freedom Rings" | Brandy | Jeffrey Gitelman; Brandy Norwood; Ryan M. Tedder; Coleridge Tillman | non-album release | 2019 | |
| "Full Moon" | Brandy | Mike City | Full Moon | 2002 | |
| "Give Me You" | Brandy | Rochad Holiday; Curtis "Sauce" Wilson; Jeffrey Young; Kenny Young | Brandy | 1994 | |
| "Gonna Find My Love" | Brandy | Brandy Norwood; Toby Gad; Lindy Robbins | Human | 2008 | |
| "Happy" | Brandy | LaShawn Daniels; Rodney Jerkins; Fred Jerkins III; Brandy Norwood; Joana Tejeda | Never Say Never | 1998 | |
| "Hardly Breathing" | Brandy | Robert Butler; Pierre Medor | Two Eleven | 2012 | |
| "Have You Ever?" | Brandy | Diane Warren | Never Say Never | 1998 | |
| "Have Yourself a Merry Little Christmas" | Brandy | Ralph Blane; Hugh Martin | Christmas with Brandy | 2023 | |
| "He Is" | Brandy | Warryn Campbell; Harold Lilly; Brandy Norwood | Full Moon | 2002 | |
| "High Heels" | Brandy featuring Sy'rai | Darhyl Camper, Jr. Akil "Fresh" King; Kim "Kaydence" Krysiuk; Brandy Norwood; Sy'rai Smith | B7 | 2020 | |
| "How I Feel" | Brandy | Walter Millsap III; Candice Nelson; Erick Walls | Afrodisiac | 2004 | |
| "Human" | Brandy | Brandy Norwood; Toby Gad; Lindy Robbins; Esthero | Human | 2008 | |
| "I'm Yours" | Brandy | Arvel McClinton; Damon Thomas | Brandy | 1994 | |
| "I Am More" | Brandy | Akil "Fresh" King; Kim "Kaydence" Krysiuk; Brandy Norwood | B7 | 2020 | |
| "I Dedicate (Part I–III)" | Brandy | Rochad Holiday; Brandy Norwood; Curtis "Sauce" Wilson; Jeffrey Young | Brandy | 1994 | |
| "I Don't Care" | Brandy | Clinton Sparks; Brandy Norwood; Corey Gibson; Grigancine; Stacy Barthe | A Family Business | 2011 | |
| "I Know Now" | Brandy | Warryn Campbell | Bad Boy Presents: Thank You | 2001 | |
| "I Thought" | Brandy | LaShawn Daniels; Fred Jerkins III; Rodney Jerkins | Full Moon | 2002 | |
| "I Tried" | Brandy | Walter Millsap III; Candice Nelson; Tim Mosley; Will Champion; Steve Harris; Chris Martin; Guy Berryman; Johnny Buckland | Afrodisiac | 2004 | |
| "I Wanna Be Down" | Brandy | Keith Crouch; Kipper Jones | Brandy | 1994 | |
| "I Wanna Fall in Love" | Brandy | LaShawn Daniels; Brandy Norwood; Kenisha Pratt; Rodney Jerkins | Full Moon | 2002 | |
| "Impossible" | Brandy with Whitney Houston | Richard Rodgers; Oscar Hammerstein II | Cinderella | 1997 | |
| "In My Own Little Corner" | Brandy | Richard Rodgers; Oscar Hammerstein II | Cinderella | 1997 | |
| "In the Car (Interlude)" | Brandy | —N/a | Never Say Never | 1998 | |
| "It's Not Worth It" | Brandy | LaShawn Daniels; Fred Jerkins III; Rodney Jerkins | Full Moon | 2002 | |
| "It's Possible" | Brandy | Richard Rodgers; Oscar Hammerstein II | Cinderella | 1997 | |
| "Jingle Bells" | Brandy | James Lord Pierpont | Christmas with Brandy | 2023 | |
| "Learn the Hard Way" | Brandy | LaShawn Daniels; Fred Jerkins III; Rodney Jerkins; Sybil Jerkins Cherry; Brandy Norwood; Rick Williams | Never Say Never | 1998 | |
| "Let Me Go" | Brandy | Shondrae Crawford; Sean Garrett; Lykke Li Zachrisson; Björn Yttling | Two Eleven | 2012 | |
| "Lifeguard" | Brandy | Jordan Omley; Michael Mani; Antonio Rayo | A Family Business | 2011 | |
| "Like It Was Yesterday" | Brandy | Mike City | Afrodisiac | 2004 | |
| "Like This" | Brandy | LaShawn Daniels; Fred Jerkins III; Rodney Jerkins; Brandy Norwood | Full Moon | 2002 | |
| "Locket (Locked in Love)" | Brandy | Christopher Breaux; Rich King; Brian Seals | Human | 2008 | |
| "Long Distance" | Brandy | Bruno Mars; Philip Lawrence; Rodney Jerkins; Jeff Bhasker | Human | 2008 | |
| "Long Distance (Interlude)" | Brandy | Brandy Norwood | Human | 2008 | |
| "Love Again" | Brandy & Daniel Caesar | Matthew Burnett; Darhyl Camper; Ronald Colson; Jordan Evans; Matthew Leon; Brandy Norwood; Ashton Simmonds | Case Study 01 | 2019 | |
| "Love Is on My Side" | Brandy | Robin Thicke; Damon Thomas | Brandy | 1994 | |
| "Love Wouldn't Count Me Out" | Brandy | LaShawn Daniels; Brandy Norwood; S. Johnson; Fred Jerkins III | Full Moon | 2002 | |
| "Lucid Dreams" | Brandy | Darhyl Camper, Jr. Akil "Fresh" King; Kim "Kaydence" Krysiuk; Brandy Norwood | B7 | 2020 | |
| "Missing You" | Brandy, Gladys Knight, Chaka Khan & Tamia | Gordon Chambers; Barry Eastmond | Set It Off | 1996 | |
| "Moesha Theme Song" | Brandy | Kurt Farquhar; Brandy | Moesha | 1996 | |
| "Movin' On" | Brandy | Keith Crouch | Brandy | 1994 | |
| "Music" | Brandy | Mike City; Breyon Prescott | Two Eleven | 2012 | |
| "Necessary" | Brandy | Rico Wade; Patrick Brown; Ray Murra; Cee-Lo Green | Afrodisiac | 2004 | |
| "Never Say Never" | Brandy | LaShawn Daniels; Brandy Norwood; Fred Jerkins III; Rodney Jerkins; Japhe Tejeda; Rick Williams | Never Say Never | 1998 | |
| "No Such Thing as Too Late" | Brandy | Richard Butler; James Scheffer; Daniel Morris | Two Eleven | 2012 | |
| "No Tomorrow" | Brandy | Brandy Norwood; Joshua "YXSH" Thomas | B7 | 2020 | |
| "Nodding Off" | Brandy | Walter Millsap III; Candice Nelson; Tim Mosley | Afrodisiac | 2004 | |
| "Nothing" | Brandy | LaShawn Daniels; Fred Jerkins III; Kenisha Pratt | Full Moon | 2002 | |
| "Nothing Without You" | Brandy with Sy'rai | Jon Levine; Taura Stinson | Cheaper by the Dozen | 2022 | |
| "Ohhh Lord" | Brandy with Queen Latifah & Patti LaBelle | Jordan Powers; Theron Feemster | Star | 2018 | |
| "One Voice" | Brandy | Phil Gladston; Gordon Chambers | Never Say Never | 1998 | |
| "Open" | Brandy | Mike City | Osmosis Jones | 2001 | |
| "Paint This House" | Brandy | Robert Butler; Eric Goody II; Earl Hood; Pierre Medor | Two Eleven | 2012 | |
| "Piano Man" | Brandy | Rodney Jerkins; Marvin "Tony" Hemmings; Jordan Omley | Human | 2008 | |
| "Put It Down" | Brandy featuring Chris Brown | Dwayne "Dem Jointz" Abernathy; Chris Brown; Shondrae Crawford; Sean Garrett | Two Eleven | 2012 | |
| "Put That on Everything" | Brandy | LaShawn Daniels; Brandy Norwood; Fred Jerkins III; Rodney Jerkins; Japhe Tejeda | Never Say Never | 1998 | |
| "Rather Be" | Brandy | Darhyl Camper, Jr. Antonio "Tony" Dixon; Victoria McCants; Brandy Norwood | B7 | 2020 | |
| "Right Here (Departed)" | Brandy | Rodney Jerkins; E. Kidd Bogart; David Quiñones; Erika Nuri; Victoria Horn | Human | 2008 | |
| "Sadiddy" | Brandy | Kenneth Pratt; Kenisha Pratt; Tim Mosley | Afrodisiac | 2004 | |
| "Santa Baby" | Brandy | Joan Javits; Philip Springer; Tony Springer | Christmas with Brandy | 2023 | |
| "Saving All My Love" | Brandy | Darhyl Camper, Jr. Brandy Norwood | B7 | 2020 | |
| "Say Something" | Brandy | Darhyl Camper, Jr. Larry LeeJacks, Jr. Vania "Nia V" Khaleh-Pari; Kim "Kaydence" Krysiuk; Brandy Norwood; Sean Wander | B7 | 2020 | |
| "Say You Will" | Brandy | Theron Feemster | Afrodisiac | 2004 | |
| "Scared of Beautiful" | Brandy | Christopher Breaux; Warryn Campbell; Breyon Prescott | Two Eleven | 2012 | |
| "Shattered Heart" | Brandy | Rodney Jerkins; Crystal Johnson; LaShawn Daniels | Human | 2008 | |
| "Shine Out Your Light" | Brandy | Theron Feemster; Sebastian Kole; Brandy Norwood | Christmas with Brandy | 2023 | |
| "Should I Go" | Brandy | Walter Millsap III; Candice Nelson; Tim Mosley; Will Champion; Chris Martin; Guy Berryman; Johnny Buckland | Afrodisiac | 2004 | |
| "Sirens" | Brandy | Steve "Static" Garrett; Tim Mosley | Afrodisiac | 2004 | |
| "Sittin' Up in My Room" | Brandy | Kenneth "Babyface" Edmonds | Waiting to Exhale | 1995 | |
| "Slower" | Brandy | Chris Brown; Brandy Norwood; Breyon Prescott; Amber Streeter; Dave Taylor | Two Eleven | 2012 | |
| "So Sick" | Brandy | Sean Garrett; Shondrae Crawford | Two Eleven | 2012 | |
| "Somebody’s Waiting" | Brandy | Darhyl Camper | Christmas with Brandy | 2023 | |
| "Someday at Christmas" | Brandy | Ron Miller; Bryan Wells | Christmas with Brandy | 2023 | |
| "Spotlight" | Brandy & Queen Latifah | Bernard Harvey; Fallon King; Felisha King | Star (Season 3) | 2018 | |
| "Starting Now" | Brandy | Darren Everett Criss; Warren Felder; Jason Mater; Alex Nice; Jordan Powers; Keith "Ten4" Sorrells; Yaron Spiwak | non-album release | 2021 | |
| "Sunny Day" | Brandy | Rochad Holiday; Curtis "Sauce" Wilson; Jeffrey Young; Mark Lomax | Brandy | 1994 | |
| "Talk About Our Love" | Brandy featuring Kanye West | Kanye West; Harold Lilly; Carlos Wilson; Louis Wilson; Ricardo A. Wilson; Claude Cave II | Afrodisiac | 2004 | |
| "Talk to Me" | Brandy, Ray J & Willie | Scott "Shavoni" Parker; Tommy Niblack | A Family Business | 2011 | |
| "Ten Minutes Ago" | Brandy with Paolo Montalban | Richard Rodgers; Lorenz Hart | Cinderella | 1997 | |
| "The Boy Is Mine" | Brandy & Monica | LaShawn Daniels; Fred Jerkins III; Rodney Jerkins; Brandy Norwood; Joana Tejeda | Never Say Never | 1998 | |
| "The Christmas Song" | Brandy | Mel Tormé; Robert Wells | Christmas with Brandy | 2023 | |
| "The Definition" | Brandy | Rodney Jerkins; Crystal Johnson | Human | 2008 | |
| "The Sweetest Sound" | Brandy with Paolo Montalban | Richard Rodgers; Lorenz Hart | Cinderella | 1997 | |
| "Tomorrow" | Brandy | LaShawn Daniels; Fred Jerkins III; Rodney Jerkins; Brandy Norwood; Joana Tejeda | Never Say Never | 1998 | |
| "Top of the World" | Brandy featuring Mase | Mason Betha; Isaac Phillips; Nycolia Turman; LaShawn Daniels; Fred Jerkins III; Rodney Jerkins | Never Say Never | 1998 | |
| "Torn Down" | Brandy | Kevin Risto; Waynne Nugent; Dapo Torimiro; James Fauntleroy | Human | 2008 | |
| "True" | Brandy | Nadir Khayat; Claude Kelly | Human | 2008 | |
| "Truthfully" | Brandy | LaShawn Daniels; Fred Jerkins III; Rodney Jerkins; Brandy Norwood; Joana Tejeda | Never Say Never | 1998 | |
| "Turn It Up" | Brandy | Walter Millsap III; Candice Nelson; Tim Mosley | Afrodisiac | 2004 | |
| "U Don't Know Me (Like U Used To)" | Brandy | Sean Bryant; Paris Davis; Rodney Jerkins; Brandy Norwood; Isaac Phillips | Never Say Never | 1998 | |
| "Unconditional Oceans" | Brandy | Akil "Fresh" King; Kim "Kaydence" Krysiuk; Brandy Norwood | B7 | 2020 | |
| "Warm It Up (With Love)" | Brandy | Rodney Jerkins; Marvin "Tony" Hemmings; Jordan Omley | Human | 2008 | |
| "What About Us?" | Brandy | LaShawn Daniels; Fred Jerkins III; Rodney Jerkins; Nora Payne; Kenisha Pratt | Full Moon | 2002 | |
| "What You Need" | Brandy | Shondrae Crawford; Sean Garrett | Two Eleven | 2012 | |
| "When You Touch Me" | Brandy | LaShawn Daniels; Fred Jerkins III; Rodney Jerkins; Robert Smith | Full Moon | 2002 | |
| "Where Are You Now?" | Brandy | Lenny Kravitz | Batman Forever | 1995 | |
| "Where You Wanna Be" | Brandy featuring T.I. | Kanye West; Harold Lilly | Afrodisiac | 2004 | |
| "Who I Am" | Brandy | Warryn Campbell; Joi Campbell | Afrodisiac | 2004 | |
| "Who Is She 2 U" | Brandy | Walter Millsap III; Candice Nelson; Tim Mosley; Leon Ware; Jacqueline Hilliard | Afrodisiac | 2004 | |
| "Wildest Dreams" | Brandy | Sean Garrett; Justin Henderson; Christoper Whitacre | Two Eleven | 2012 | |
| "Wish Your Love Away" | Brandy | Brandon Ramon Johnson; Tiyon "TC" Mack; Ryuichi Sakamoto; Mario Winans | Two Eleven | 2012 | |
| "Without You" | Brandy | Eric Bellinger; Courtney Harrell; Brandy Norwood; Breyon Prescott; Harmony Samuels | Two Eleven | 2012 | |
| "WOW" | Brandy | LaShawn Daniels; Fred Jerkins III; Nora Payne; Kenisha Pratt, Robert Smith | Full Moon | 2002 | |
| "Zoe Ever After Theme" | Brandy | Shane Drasin; Kurt Farquhar; Brandy Norwood | non-album release | 2016 | |

=== As a guest artist ===
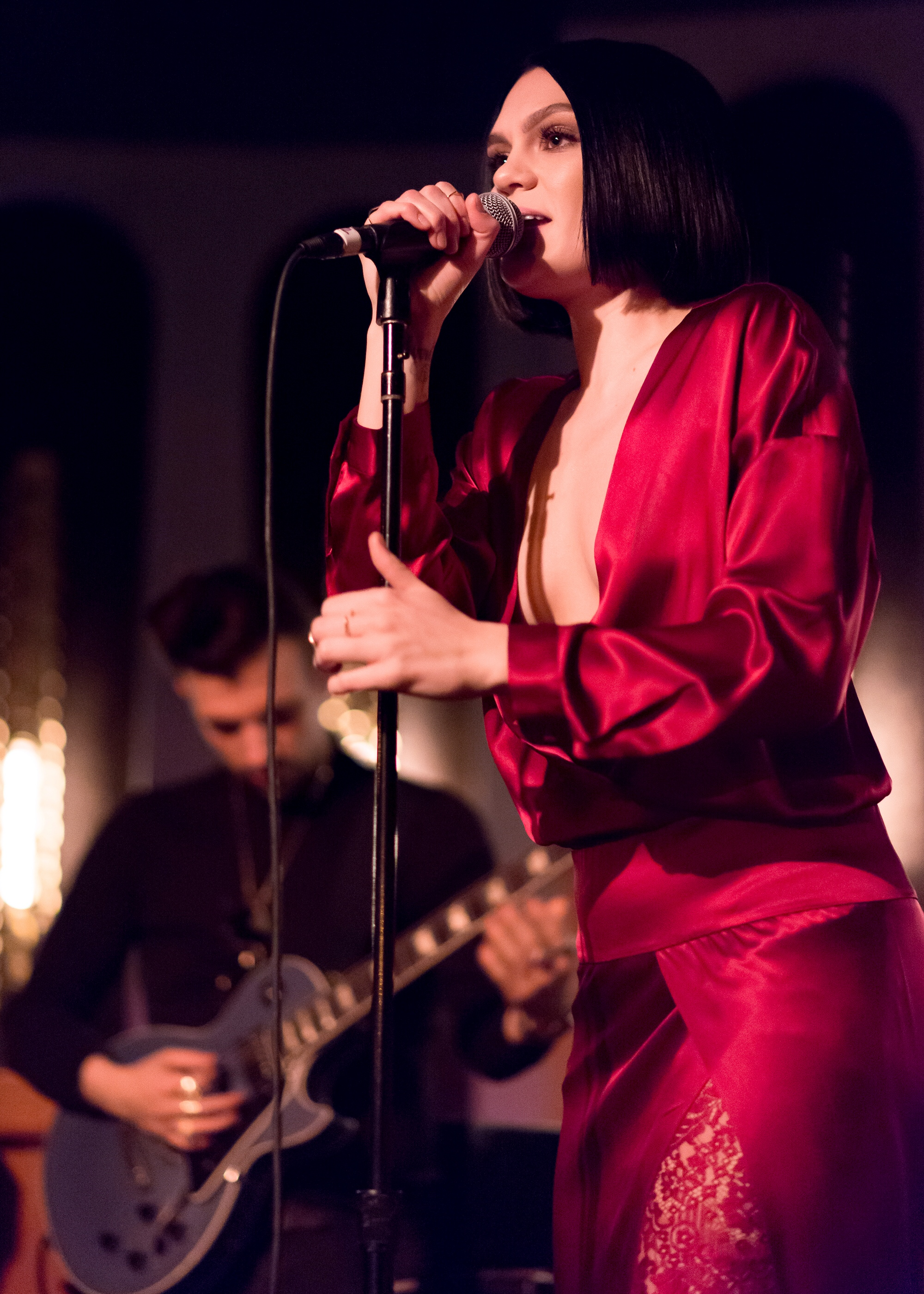
Jessie J co-wrote "Conquer the World" from her album Alive (2013) with Brandy in her mind.

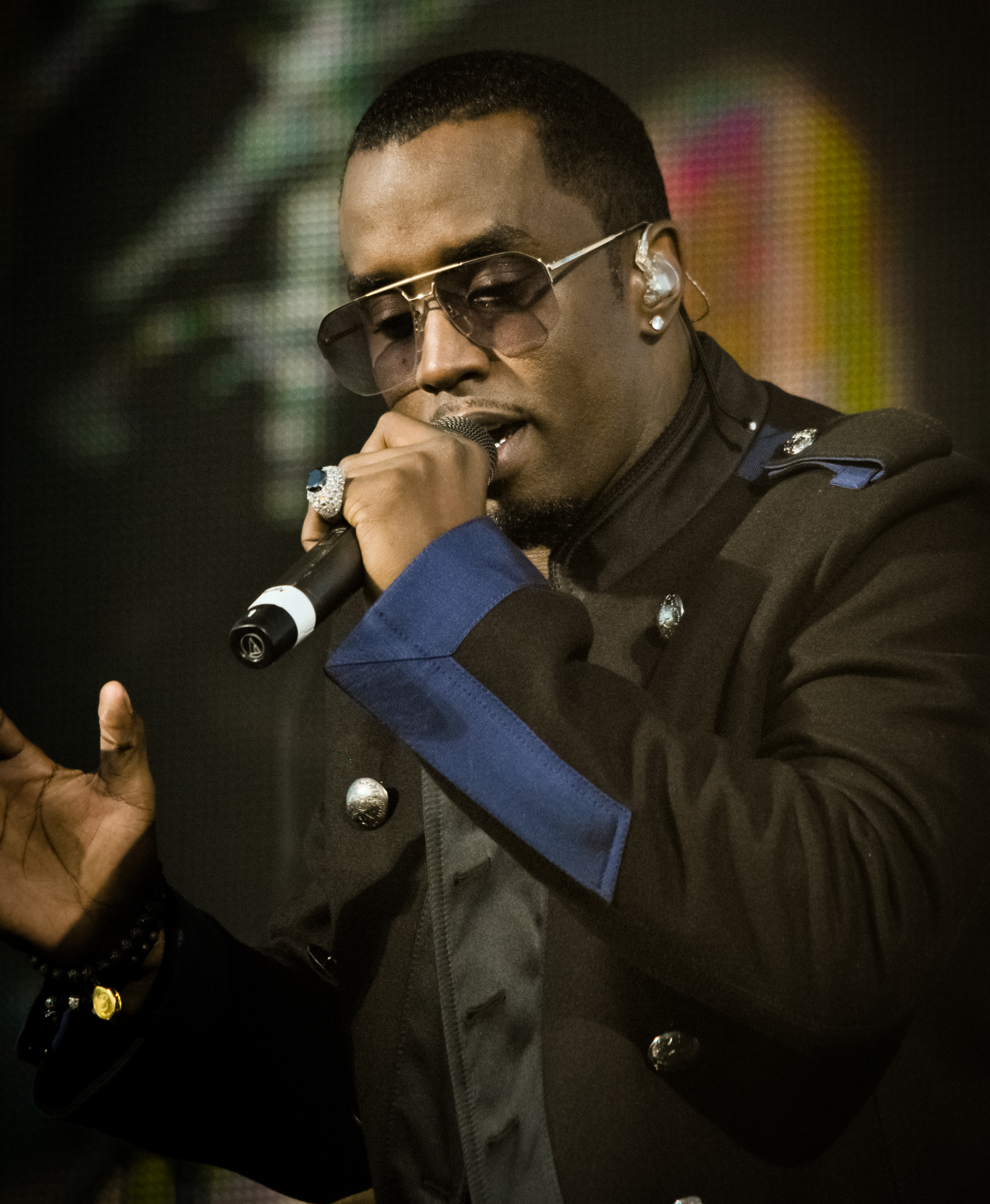
Diddy has collaborated with Norwood on several of his songs, including "Dance with Us" and "Thought You Said."

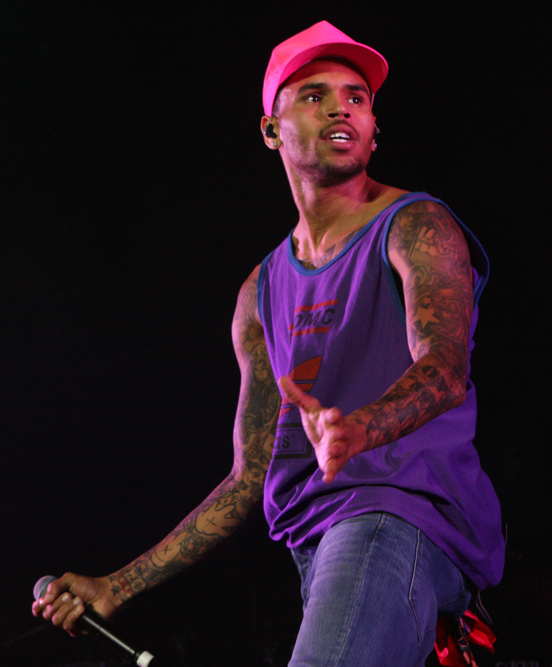
After his contributions on Two Eleven (2012), Norwood reteamed with Chris Brown on his song "Do Better."

| Song | Artist(s) | Writer(s) | Album(s) | Year | Ref. |
|---|---|---|---|---|---|
| "Ascension" | Jhené Aiko featuring Brandy | Jhené Aiko Efuru Chilombo; Oladipo Omishore; Brian Warfield; Maclean Robinson | Trip | 2015 | |
| "Back and Forth" | Camper featuring Brandy | Darhyl Camper; Brandy Norwood | Campilation | 2026 | |
| "Bring Me Down" | Kanye West featuring Brandy | Kanye West; Antony Williams | Late Registration | 2005 | |
| "Bridge to Love" | Ginuwine featuring Brandy | Adonis Shropshire; Blac Elvis | A Man's Thoughts | 2009 | |
| "Click Clack" | Todrick Hall featuring Brandy | Jeeve Ducornet; Todrick Hall; Carl Seanté McGrier; Kofi Owusu-Ofori | Femuline | 2021 | |
| "Conquer the World" | Jessie J featuring Brandy | Jessica Cornish; Claude Kelly; John Webb; Anders Froen; J. DeBardlabon; Are Sorknes | Alive | 2013 | |
| "Dynamite" | Gallant featuring Brandy | Ajay Bhattacharyya; Christopher Gallant | Neptune | 2021 | |
| "Dance with Us" | Diddy featuring Brandy & Bow Wow | Dante Nolen; Mechalie Jamison; Nisan Stewart; Rahman "Rocky" Griffin; Sean Combs | The Wild Thornberrys Movie | 2002 | |
| "Deliver Me" | Sir the Baptist featuring Brandy | Desmond Davis; Marshon Lewis; Brandy Norwood; William James Stokes; Rob Woolridge | Saint or Sinner | 2017 | |
| "Do Better" | Chris Brown featuring Brandy | Chris Brown; Glass John; Brandy Norwood; Brent Paschke | X | 2014 | |
| "Emerald City" | Ray J featuring Brandy | Jason Betts; Phonix Beats; Willie Ray Norwood, Jr. | Emerald City | 2019 | |
| "Euphoric" | Eric Bellinger featuring Brandy | Milton Adams; Eric Bellinger; Brandy Norwood; Benjamin Singh-Reynolds | New Light | 2021 | |
| "Even More" | MAJOR. featuring Brandy | Harmony Samuels | —N/a | 2019 | |
| "F.A.I.T.H.F.U.L." | Nick Cannon featuring Brandy | —N/a | The Explicit Tape: Raw & B | 2022 | |
| "Folded (Remix)" | Kehlani featuring Brandy | Kehlani Parrish |Andre Harris; Donovan Knight; Miloš Angelov; Khristopher Riddick-Tynes; Darius Scott; Dawit Wilson | —N/a | 2025 | |
| "Formal Invite (Knockout Remix)" | Ray J featuring Shorty Mack & Brandy | LaShawn Daniels; Fred Jerkins III; Rodney Jerkins; Nora Payne; Robert Smith | This Ain't a Game | 2001 | |
| "The Girl Is Mine" | 99 Souls featuring Destiny's Child & Brandy | Rodney Jerkins; Fred Jerkins III; Japhe Tejeda; Beyoncé Knowles; Angela Beyince; Patrick Douthit; LaShawn Daniels; Edward Robinson; Kelendria Rowland; Tenitra Williams; Brandy Norwood; Donald Davis | —N/a | 2015 | |
| "God On My Mind" | The Walls Group featuring Brandy | Kirk Franklin | Fast Forward | 2014 | |
| "Into My Eyes" | Stacy Francis with Brandy | —N/a | My Soulful Side | 2008 | |
| "It All Belongs to Me" | Monica and Brandy | Rico Love; Earl Hood; Eric Goudy II | New Life | 2012 | |
| "Jet Black" | Anderson Paak featuring Brandy | Brandon Anderson; Brandy Norwood; David Pimentel | Ventura | 2019 | |
| "Jook Joint Intro" | Quincy Jones featuring Brandy & Various Artists | Quincy Jones | Q's Jook Joint | 1995 | |
| "LA" | Ty Dolla $ign featuring Kendrick Lamar, Brandy & James Fauntleroy | Tyrone Griffin, Jr. Kendrick Duckworth; Brandy Norwood; James Fauntleroy | Free TC | 2015 | |
| "Love Is All That Matters" | Diana Ross featuring Brandy | Diane Warren | Double Platinum | 1999 | |
| "Lullaby" | Todrick Hall featuring Brandy | Jean-Yves Ducornet; Todrick Hall; Carl Seante McGrier; Kofi Owusu-Ofori | Forbidden | 2018 | |
| "Magic" | Mystery Skulls featuring Brandy & Nile Rodgers | Esjay Jones; Luis Dubuc; Mike Elizondo | Forever | 2014 | |
| "Meet Me in the Middle" | Timbaland featuring Bran'Nu | Timothy Clayton; Brandy Norwood; John Maultsby; Tim Mosley; Paul Dawson; Jamal Jones | Shock Value II | 2009 | |
| "N 2 da Music" | Timbaland & Magoo featuring Brandy | Timothy Clayton; Melvin Barcliff; Tim Mosley | Under Construction, Part II | 2003 | |
| "Number One" | Mystery Skulls featuring Brandy & Nile Rodgers | Luis Dubuc; Asia Whiteacre | Forever | 2014 | |
| "Optimistic" | August Greene featuring Brandy | Gary Hines; Jimmy Jam; Terry Lewis | August Greene | 2018 | |
| "Please Come to Boston" | Babyface featuring Brandy | Dave Loggins | Playlist | 2007 | |
| "Plan B" | Ro James featuring Brandy | Courtney Taylor | Mantic | 2020 | |
| "Quickly" | John Legend featuring Brandy | Christopher Breaux; Dapo Torimiro; John Stephens; Kevin Risto; Waynne Nugent | Evolver | 2008 | |
| "Rest of Our Lives" | Tyrese featuring Brandy | Asaleana Elliott; Tyrese Gibson; Brandon Hodge; Aaron Sledge; Leon Timbo | Black Rose | 2015 | |
| "Rock with You" | Quincy Jones with Brandy & Heavy D | Rod Temperton | Q's Jook Joint | 1995 | |
| "Silent Night" | India Arie & Joe Sample featuring Brandy | Franz Xaver Gruber; Joseph Mohr | Christmas with Friends | 2015 | |
| "Sleep" | Camper featuring Brandy | Darhyl Camper | Darhyl Camper; Larry Jacks; Brandy Norwood | 2020 | |
| "Smack On God" | Lil Keed featuring Brandy | Brandy Norwood; Raqhid Render | Keed Talk to 'Em | 2018 | |
| "Somebody's Son" | Tiwa Savage featuring Brandy | Sunday Adeniyi Adegeye; Segun Michael Ajayi; Richard King; Brandy Norwood; Oluwatosin Tofumi Oguntade; Tiwa Savage | Water & Garri | 2021 | |
| "Somethin' Bout You" | Carl Thomas featuring Brandy | Mike City | So Much Better | 2007 | |
| "Special" | Snoop Dogg featuring Brandy & Pharrell | Pharrell Williams | Malice n Wonderland | 2009 | |
| "Stuff Like That" | Quincy Jones with Ashford & Simpson, Brandy, Chaka Khan, Charlie Wilson & Ray Charles | Quincy Jones; Valerie Simpson; Nick Ashford; Eric Gale; Steve Gadd; Richard Tee; Ralph McDonald | Q's Jook Joint | 1995 | |
| "Symphony" | Timbaland featuring Attitude, Bran'Nu & D.O.E. | Timothy Clayton; Brandy Norwood; John Maultsby; Tim Mosley; Brandy Norwood; Jim Beanz; Keithin Pittman | Shock Value II | 2009 | |
| "Tell Me" | Sho featuring Brandy | Cedric Lamar Mayfield | Sho & Tell (Thug & A Gentleman) | 2009 | |
| "Thank You" | Ray J featuring Brandy | Keith Crouch; Kipper Jones | Everything You Want | 1997 | |
| "The Boy Is Mine (Remix)" | Ariana Grande with Brandy and Monica | Ariana Grande; Brandy Norwood; David Park; Max Martin; Monica Arnold; Shintaro Yasuda | Eternal Sunshine (Slightly Deluxe and Also Live) | 2024 | |
| "Thought You Said" | Diddy featuring Brandy | Sean Combs; Sean Garrett; Shannon Jones; Leroy Watson; Mario Winans | Press Play | 2006 | |
| "Wake Up Everybody" | Various Artists | John Whitehead; Gene McFadden; Victor Carstarphen | Wake Up Everybody | 2004 | |
| "War Is Over" | Ray J featuring Brandy | Noel "Detail" Fisher; Brandy Norwood; Willie Norwood, Jr. | Raydiation | 2005 | |
| "The Wave" | Amorphous featuring Brandy & James Fauntleroy | Jimir Reece Davis; James Fauntleroy; Brandy Norwood | Things Take Shape | 2021 | |
| "We Are the World 25 for Haiti" | Artists for Haiti | Michael Jackson; Lionel Richie | —N/a | 2010 | |
| "What Are We Doing" | Robert Glasper featuring Brandy | Robert Glasper; Claude Kelly; Brandy Norwood | Black Radio 2 | 2013 | |

== Unreleased songs ==
Many of the singer's unreleased songs have been registered – the majority by her publishing company Bran Bran Music – with professional bodies such as the United States Copyright Office, the Songwriters Hall of Fame, Broadcast Music Incorporated (BMI), American Society of Composers, Authors and Publishers (ASCAP), the Canadian Musical Reproduction Rights Agency (CMRRA) and EMI Music Publishing. Many officially unreleased Brandy songs have been scheduled, at one point, for release on records by the singer, including her six studio albums with her former music labels Atlantic, Epic and RCA Records: Brandy (1994), Never Say Never (1998), Full Moon (2002), Afrodisiac (2004), Human (2008), Two Eleven (2012), and B7 (2020). For varying reasons, the tracks were ultimately rejected and, as of 2016, remain either completely unreleased or have been leaked onto the internet and mixtapes without gaining an official release. The singer's unreleased material includes songs recorded by Norwood as a solo artist and demo versions of tracks which were eventually re-recorded by other artists, some featuring established artists such as Rihanna, Ne-Yo, Sean Paul, Jennifer Lopez and Timbaland.

| Song | Other performer(s) | Writer(s) | Intended album | Leak | Ref |
|---|---|---|---|---|---|
| "808" | Timbaland | Timothy Mosley | —N/a | Yes | |
| "Adios" | Sean Paul | Sean Paul Henriques; Walter Millsap III; Timothy Mosley; Candice Nelson | Afrodisiac | Yes | |
| "After the Flood" | —N/a | LaShawn Daniels; James Fauntleroy; Rodney Jerkins | Human | Yes | |
| "All the Time" | —N/a | Kenisha Pratt; Frederik N. Schjoldan; Louis Winding | —N/a | No | |
| "Aviator" | Audio Push | Julian Brown; Kazha Hornsby; Larry Jacks; Malkia Thumbi | The Soundtrack | Yes | |
| "B-Rocka" | —N/a | Kenisha Pratt; Frederik N. Schjoldan; Louis Winding | —N/a | No | |
| "B-Rocken" | —N/a | Walter Millsap III; Timothy Mosley; Candice Nelson | Afrodisiac | No | |
| "Back and Forth" | —N/a | Eric Hudson; Adonis Shropshire | —N/a | Yes | |
| "Back to Sleep (Remix)" | Chris Brown | Chris Brown; Anderson Hernandez; Matthew Samuels; Allen Ritter; August Rigo | —N/a | Yes | |
| "Beautiful" | —N/a | Chauncey Hollis; Erika Hamilton; Brandy Norwood | —N/a | Yes | |
| "Beautiful Minds" | —N/a | Darhyl Camper; Brandy Norwood | B7 | No | |
| "Beauty" | —N/a | Kenisha Pratt; Frederik N. Schjoldan; Louis Winding | —N/a | No | |
| "Been So Long" | —N/a | Brandy Norwood; Kenisha Pratt; Timothy Mosley; Willie Norwood, Jr. Kenny Young | Afrodisiac | No | |
| "Believer" | Timbaland | James Fauntleroy; Jerome Harmon; Timothy Mosley | —N/a | Yes | |
| "Believer" | Esthero | —N/a | —N/a | Yes | |
| "Best of You" | —N/a | Kenneth Karlin; Andrea Martin; Ivan Matias; Carsten Schack | —N/a | No | |
| "Betcha Didn't Know" | —N/a | Mikkel Storleer Eriksen; Tor Erik Hermansen; Makeba Riddick | —N/a | Yes | |
| "Between Me and You" | —N/a | Mikkel Storleer Eriksen; Tor Erik Hermansen; Shaffer Smith | —N/a | Yes | |
| "Black Pepper" | —N/a | Walter Millsap III; Timothy Mosley; Candice Nelson | Afrodisiac | No | |
| "Boom in It" | Mario | —N/a | —N/a | Yes | |
| "Boyfriend" | —N/a | Kenisha Pratt; Frederik N. Schjoldan; Louis Winding | —N/a | No | |
| "Brandy & Ray-J" | —N/a | Brandy Norwood; Willie Norwood, Jr. Kenisha Pratt; Kenneth Pratt | —N/a | No | |
| "Brave" | —N/a | Sara Bareilles; Jack Antonoff | —N/a | Yes | |
| "Bring It Back" | —N/a | Johntá Austin; Eric Hudson | —N/a | Yes | |
| "Can't Control Myself" | —N/a | Ebony Burks; Tyrice Jones | —N/a | No | |
| "Can't Cope" | —N/a | Stacy Barthe; Theron Feemster; Corey Gibson; Brandy Norwood | —N/a | No | |
| "Casualties" | —N/a | James Fauntleroy; Waynne Nugent; Kevin Risto; Dapo Torimiro | —N/a | Yes | |
| "Cigarette" | —N/a | —N/a | —N/a | Yes | |
| "Clean Get Away" | —N/a | Marcella Araica; Kevin Cossom; Floyd Hills | —N/a | No | |
| "Criminal" | Burhan G | Kenisha Pratt; Frederik N. Schjoldan; Louis Winding | —N/a | No | |
| "Cry" | —N/a | Bryan Michael Cox; Kendrick Dean; Adonis Shropshire | —N/a | Yes | |
| "Dangerous Minds" | —N/a | Darhyl Camper; Brandy Norwood; Varren Wade | B7 | No | |
| "Decisions" | Ne-Yo | Mikkel Storleer Eriksen; Tor Erik Hermansen; Shaffer Smith | —N/a | Yes | |
| "Deepest Thought" | —N/a | Michael Flowers | —N/a | Yes | |
| "Dismissed" | —N/a | Blake English; Brandy Norwood; Nora Payne; Robert Smith | —N/a | No | |
| "Don't Say You're Sorry" | —N/a | Kenisha Pratt | —N/a | No | |
| "Drum Life" | —N/a | James Fauntleroy; Jerome Harmon; Timothy Mosley | —N/a | Yes | |
| "Empty Promises" | —N/a | Rodney Jerkins | —N/a | No | |
| "Escape" | —N/a | Blake English; Brandy Norwood; Robert Smith | —N/a | Yes | |
| "Every Bit of Lover" | —N/a | Shawn Stockman | —N/a | No | |
| "Fairy Tales" | —N/a | Brandy Norwood; Isaac Phillips; Kenisha Pratt; Kenneth Pratt; Robert Smith | —N/a | No | |
| "Fall Back" | DJ Whoo Kid, Fabolous & Lloyd Banks | —N/a | —N/a | Yes | |
| "Fear of Flying" | —N/a | Ian Dench; Mikkel Storleer Eriksen; Amanda Ghost; Tor Erik Hermansen | —N/a | Yes | |
| "February Fame" | —N/a | Calix Grey | —N/a | No | |
| "Fire" | BenZel & Jessie Ware | Ben Ash; Benjamin Levin; Jessica Ware | —N/a | No | |
| "The First Lady" | Rhona Bennett | J. Y. Park; Tone Scott | The Anticipation of R&B | Yes | |
| "Fooled by the Moon" | —N/a | Diane Warren | —N/a | Yes | |
| "Freedom" | —N/a | Kenisha Pratt | —N/a | No | |
| "Freedom" | —N/a | Christopher Breaux; Antwoine Collins; Rich King | —N/a | Yes | |
| "Galaxy" | —N/a | Christopher Jones | —N/a | No | |
| "Game Up" | —N/a | Harold Lilly; Timothy Mosley | —N/a | No | |
| "Get Enough" | —N/a | Kenisha Pratt; Frederik N. Schjoldan; Louis Winding | —N/a | No | |
| "God Gave Me My Way" | —N/a | Mischke Butler; Harvey Mason, Jr. Damon Thomas | —N/a | No | |
| "Gone From Me" | —N/a | Christian Ballard; Lindy Benson; Andrew Murray | —N/a | No | |
| "Good Night Good Morning" | —N/a | Mikkel Storleer Eriksen; Tor Erik Hermansen; Shaffer Smith | —N/a | Yes | |
| "Hate It That You Love Me" | —N/a | —N/a | —N/a | Yes | |
| "Heard It All Before (SoulLife Remix)" | Sunshine Anderson | Sunshine Anderson; Chris Dawley; Michael Flowers; Rayshawn Sherrer | —N/a | Yes | |
| "Heartbeat" | —N/a | Kenisha Pratt; Frederik N. Schjoldan; Louis Winding | —N/a | No | |
| "Heart Breaker" | —N/a | Christopher Jones | —N/a | No | |
| "Hey Girl" | —N/a | Paul Allen; James Lorell Moss | Full Moon | No | |
| "Hokis Pokis (Aboracadabora)" | —N/a | Timothy Mosley; Isaac Phillips; Kenisha Pratt; Kenneth Pratt | —N/a | No | |
| "Home" | Timbaland | James Fauntleroy; Jerome Harmon; Timothy Mosley | —N/a | Yes | |
| "Honey" | —N/a | Kenisha Pratt; Frederik N. Schjoldan; Louis Winding | —N/a | Yes | |
| "How High" | —N/a | Stacy Barthe; Matthew Bronson; Mischa Chillak; Brandy Norwood | —N/a | Yes | |
| "Hush" | D.O.E. | Kenisha Pratt; John Maultsby; Timothy Mosley | Afrodisiac | No | |
| "I Don't Really Care" | —N/a | Mikkel Storleer Eriksen; Tor Erik Hermansen; Shaffer Smith | —N/a | Yes | |
| "I Really Like It" | Harlem World & Ma$e | —N/a | —N/a | No | |
| "I'm Right Here" | —N/a | Mikkel Storleer Eriksen; Tor Erik Hermansen; Shaffer Smith | —N/a | Yes | |
| "I've Seen Your Kind Before" | —N/a | Jason Boyd; Brandy Norwood; Robert Smith | —N/a | No | |
| "In My Head" | —N/a | Stacy Barthe; Corey Gibson; Sean Marshall; Brandy Norwood; Gary Spriggs | Two Eleven | No | |
| "In Your Head" | —N/a | Brandy Norwood; Kenisha Pratt; Kenneth Pratt; Isaac Phillips | ^{[a]} | No | |
| "It Just Doesn't Matter" | —N/a | Blake English; Brandy Norwood; Robert Smith | —N/a | Yes | |
| "It Never Happened" | Mike City | Michael Flowers | —N/a | Yes | |
| "It's On" | —N/a | Brandy Norwood; Robert Smith | —N/a | Yes | |
| "The Joneses" | —N/a | Michael Flowers | —N/a | Yes | |
| "Just like Tommy" | —N/a | Michael Flowers | —N/a | Yes | |
| "Keyed" | —N/a | Brian Kennedy | —N/a | Yes | |
| "Knowing Nothing" | —N/a | Kenisha Pratt; Frederik N. Schjoldan; Louis Winding | —N/a | No | |
| "La-La-Land" | —N/a | Durrell Babbs; Andre Young | Afrodisiac | Yes | |
| "Lately" | —N/a | Kenisha Pratt; Frederik N. Schjoldan; Louis Winding | —N/a | Yes | |
| "Lay with Me" | —N/a | Nichols Damond Dontrae; Brandy Norwood | —N/a | No | |
| "Leave" | —N/a | Blake English; Brandy Norwood; Nora Payne; Robert Smith | —N/a | Yes | |
| "List" | —N/a | James Fauntleroy; Robin Tadross | —N/a | Yes | |
| "Louboutins" | —N/a | Terius Nash; Christopher Stewart | —N/a | Yes | |
| "Love" | Mario | Maurice Casey Harris | —N/a | No | |
| "Love to Find Love" | —N/a | Kurt Farquhar; Brandy Norwood; Jacob Quetant-Slatton | Zoe Ever After | No | |
| "Lovin'" | —N/a | Brandy Norwood; Isaac Phillips; Kenisha Pratt | —N/a | No | |
| "Magic" | —N/a | Guy Berryman; Jonny Buckland; Will Champion; Chris Martin | —N/a | Yes | |
| "Maximum Risk" | —N/a | Kenisha Pratt; Frederik N. Schjoldan; Louis Winding | —N/a | Yes | |
| "Never Go Away" | —N/a | Kelly Price; Stevie J | —N/a | No | |
| "Never Going to Let You Go" | —N/a | LaShawn Daniels; Japhe Tejeda; Fred Jerkins III; Rodney Jerkins; Jono Kohen | —N/a | No | |
| "No Ordinary Girl" | —N/a | Andrea Martin; Jorge Corante; Ivan Matias | Brandy | No | |
| "Not Another" | Priscilla Renea | Priscilla Renea | —N/a | No | |
| "Obsession" | —N/a | Rodney Jerkins; Brandy Norwood; Isaac Phillips; Kenisha Pratt; Kenneth Pratt | —N/a | No | |
| "One" | —N/a | Michael Flowers | —N/a | No | |
| "One That Got Away" | —N/a | Harmony Samuels | —N/a | No | |
| "One Thing" | —N/a | Christopher Breaux; Brian Kennedy; Rich King | —N/a | Yes | |
| "Our World" | —N/a | Amalie Alstrup; Kenisha Pratt; Frederik Tao Schjoldan; Louis Winding | —N/a | No | |
| "Patience" | —N/a | Kenisha Pratt | —N/a | No | |
| "Pink Diamonds" | —N/a | Philip Dencker; Jens Lomholt; Kenisha Pratt | ^{[b]} | No | |
| "Pound 4 Pound" | DJ Whoo Kid & G-Unit | —N/a | The Mixtape Sessions | Yes | |
| "Public Eye" | —N/a | Michael Flowers | —N/a | No | |
| "Romeo and Juliet" | —N/a | Ian Dench; Amanda Ghost; Brandy Norwood | —N/a | Yes | |
| "Ritual" | —N/a | Walter Millsap III | —N/a | No | |
| "Royalty" | —N/a | Kenisha Pratt; Frederik N. Schjoldan; Louis Winding | —N/a | No | |
| "Ryde or Die" | —N/a | Blake English; Brandy Norwood; Robert Smith | —N/a | Yes | |
| "Same Page" | —N/a | Cecil Tabarius Jackson; Angela Darlene Scott | —N/a | No | |
| "Save the Babies" | N.E.R.D. | —N/a | In Search of... | No | |
| "Second Thought" | —N/a | Rodney Jerkins | —N/a | Yes | |
| "Second Time Around" | —N/a | Kenisha Pratt; Frederik N. Schjoldan; Louis Winding | —N/a | No | |
| "She Can't Be Me" | —N/a | LaShawn Daniels; Shamar Daugherty; Alonzo Lee Jr. | —N/a | No | |
| "Shit Hot Damn Motherfucker" | —N/a | Kenisha Pratt; Frederik N. Schjoldan; Louis Winding | —N/a | No | |
| "Shivering" | —N/a | Kenisha Pratt; Frederik N. Schjoldan; Louis Winding | —N/a | No | |
| "Silent Night" | —N/a | Stacy Barthe; Corey Gibson; Sean Marshall; Brandy Norwood; Gary Spriggs | Two Eleven | Yes | |
| "Skin Deep" | —N/a | Kenisha Pratt; Frederik N. Schjoldan; Louis Winding | —N/a | No | |
| "Slow Love" | —N/a | Ian Dench; Mikkel Storleer Eriksen; Amanda Ghost; Tor Erik Hermansen; Beyoncé Knowles | —N/a | Yes | |
| "So into You" | —N/a | Tim Kelley; Bob Robinson; Lionel Richie; Ronald LaPread | Never Say Never | No | |
| "So Good" | —N/a | Blake English; Brandy Norwood; Kenisha Pratt; Robert Smith | —N/a | Yes | |
| "Sometimes" | —N/a | Brandy Norwood; Kenisha Pratt; Robert Smith | —N/a | Yes | |
| "Stuck (No Where)" | —N/a | Brandy Norwood; Kenisha Pratt; Robert Smith | —N/a | No | |
| "Stupid in Love" | —N/a | Mikkel Storleer Eriksen; Tor Erik Hermansen; Shaffer Smith | —N/a | Yes | |
| "Sunshine" | —N/a | Robert Smith | —N/a | No | |
| "Surprise Ending" | —N/a | Christopher Breaux | —N/a | Yes | |
| "Sweet Nothings" | —N/a | Kenisha Pratt; Frederik N. Schjoldan; Louis Winding | —N/a | Yes | |
| "Sy'Rai" | —N/a | Christopher Breaux; Rodney Jerkins; Rich King | —N/a | No | |
| "Take Me Away" | —N/a | Blake English; Brandy Norwood; Nora Payne; Robert Smith | Full Moon | Yes | |
| "Tear Drop" | —N/a | Kenisha Pratt; Frederik N. Schjoldan; Louis Winding | —N/a | No | |
| "That Shit Interlude" | —N/a | Kenisha Pratt; Frederik N. Schjoldan; Louis Winding | —N/a | No | |
| "That Way" | —N/a | Kenisha Pratt; Frederik N. Schjoldan; Louis Winding | —N/a | No | |
| "This Must Be Love" | —N/a | Vincent Davis; Blake English; Caleb Simms | —N/a | Yes | |
| "Throw It All Away" | —N/a | —N/a | —N/a | Yes | |
| "Today" | —N/a | Christopher Breaux; Antwoine Collins; Rich King | Human | Yes | |
| "Too Little Too Late" | —N/a | Mikkel Storleer Eriksen; Tor Erik Hermansen; Shaffer Smith | —N/a | Yes | |
| "U Can Never Be" | Fats | Norman Gregg; Rodney Jerkins | —N/a | Yes | |
| "Wastin' My Time" | —N/a | John W. Knight | —N/a | No | |
| "When" | —N/a | Kenisha Pratt; Frederik N. Schjoldan; Louis Winding | —N/a | No | |
| "When Disaster Strikes" | —N/a | Claude Kelly; Rodney Jerkins | —N/a | No | |
| "When It's Real" | —N/a | Michael Flowers | —N/a | No | |
| "Whenever You Like" | Timbaland | Timothy Mosley; Brandy Norwood | Shock Value II | Yes | |
| "Where Is the One" | —N/a | Diane Warren | —N/a | No | |
| "White Flag" | —N/a | Ester Dean; Chauncey Hollis | Two Eleven | No | |
| "Who Can I Trust" | —N/a | Michael Flowers | —N/a | No | |
| "Who Did I Think He Was" | —N/a | Midian Mathers; Brandy Norwood; Aaron Pearce; Nikki Williams | —N/a | No | |
| "Who's the Loser Now?" | —N/a | James Fauntleroy; Jerome Harmon; Timothy Mosley | Human | Yes | |
| "Wish I Never Met U" | —N/a | Walter Millsap III; Timothy Mosley; Candice Nelson | Afrodisiac | No | |
| "You're Not Over Me" | —N/a | Kurt Farquhar; Brandy Norwood | —N/a | No | |
| "You're the Only One for Me" | —N/a | LaShawn Daniels; Fred Jerkins III; Kenyatta Jerkins; Rodney Jerkins | —N/a | Yes | |
