= Christmas with Brandy =

Studio album by Brandy
- Released: November 10, 2023
- Recorded: 2023
- Studios: TAG Recording Studios (Los Angeles, CA); Ahh Haa Studios (Burbank, CA)
- Length: 35:07
- Labels: Brand Nu; Motown
- Producers: Nasri Atweh; DJ Camper; Theron Feemster; Kyle Mann; Adam Messinger; David Williams II

Brandy chronology
B7 (2020)	Christmas with Brandy (2023)

Singles from Christmas with Brandy
- 1. "Christmas Party for Two" Released: November 3, 2023

Christmas with Brandy is the eighth studio album by American singer Brandy Norwood. It was released on November 10, 2023, through her own label Brand Nu, Inc. and Motown. A follow-up to her 2020 album B7, it marked her first Christmas album as well as her debut release with Motown. Chiefly produced by Theron "Neff-U" Feemster," with additional production from DJ Camper, Kyle Mann, and Nasri Atweh and Adam Messinger from The Messengers, Christmas with Brandy consists of twelve tracks, featuring six original songs co-penned by Norwood and six cover versions of Christmas standards songs.

The album earned largely positive reviews from music critics who called it a delightful edition to modern Christmas music. Upon its release, Christmas with Brandy debuted at number 29 on the Billboard US Top Holiday Albums and reached number 50 on Billboard's Current Album Sales chart. Its release date coincided with the release of the Netflix Christmas comedy film Best. Christmas. Ever!, which Norwood had filmed alongside Heather Graham, Jason Biggs, and Matt Cedeño. The album was preceded by R&B ballad "Christmas Party for Two," the album's lead single, released on November 3, 2023.

== Background and release ==
In March 2022, Deadline Hollywood reported that Norwood had signed on to star opposite Heather Graham, Jason Biggs, and Matt Cedeño in the Netflix film Best. Christmas. Ever!. Co-written by Charles Shyer and directed by Mary Lambert, the Christmas comedy deals with two frenemies stuck together for Christmas. In June 2022, Norwood signed with Motown Records. The partnership marked her first major label deal in over a decade. In September 2023, Motown A&R executive Jaha Johnson revealed that Norwood was working on a Christmas album whose release date would coincide with the release of Best. Christmas. Ever!. On October 20, 2023, Norwood announced that the album would be released on November 10, 2023, writing: "I feel so blessed to be able to create an album surrounding joy, Family, love and quality divine time with the ones you love."

In an interview with Variety, Norwood stated that even though Christmas with Brandy is the artist's eighth studio album, "[t]his isn’t the B8 album, no [...] this is just my contribution to Christmas and how much Christmas means to me and that’s all it is [...] I’m not going to stop doing music, but I would love to get into some new records in the future. But I just want to really get this out here and see how people feel about this record first." First called A Brandy Christmas, the album was renamed late into the production, with Norwood commenting: "Different people on your team have opinions and you try to make sure everybody's opinion gets in there. We had a toss-up between A Brandy Christmas and Christmas with Brandy. I like Christmas with Brandy. It has a nice ring to it."

== Singles ==
Christmas with Brandy's first single "Christmas Party for Two" was released on November 3, 2023, along with a snippet of Norwood's rendition of the Stevie Wonder classic "Someday at Christmas." A lyric video for "Christmas Party for Two" was released the same day, followed by a lyric video for "Christmas Everyday," issued on November 17, 2023. A black-and-white music video for "Christmas Party for Two," directed by William Sikora, was released on December 5, 2023.

== Critical reception ==
Professional ratings
Review scores
Source	Rating
Columbia Daily Tribune	4/5 stars
Cryptic Rock	4/5 stars

Antwane Folk, reviewing for Rated R&B, praised the album as "a delightful change of pace that provides comfort and joy during the holiday season now and for several years to come." He found that Norwood's "assured imagination and warm vocals take center stage to reveal a deeper musical personality." Columbia Daily Tribune critic Aarik Danielsen found that "on the first holiday record of her 30-year career, Brandy leans into the string- and keyboard-driven R&B she has practically perfected. Nimbly mingling heartbroken holiday-set ballads and standards, Brandy offers that rarest of Christmas-music gifts — an album that sounds exactly like an artist being themselves." Cryptic Rock called that Christmas with Brandy "a delightful edition to modern Christmas music" and described it as "a rather smooth R&B Christmas tingling collection [...] done with passion, love, and a sincere sense of Christmas spirit." The website's editorial staff noted that "it would not be out of place to spin some of these original songs before or after the Christmas season either."

Soul Bounce's Suzy Sonshyn remarked that "our wish has finally been fulfilled with Christmas with Brandy, which is an R&B gift that will keep on giving." She felt that "while Brandy’s new entries to the catalog of Christmas music are top-notch, we are also smitten with her spin on some of our favorite carols and classics [that] listeners will be drawn to." Associated Press editor Maria Sherman ranked the album among the best holiday released of 2023 and wrote: "For those looking for a seductive holiday album: the search is over. R&B great Brandy has released Christmas with Brandy, a collection of sultry – and in other moments, soulful – imaginations of Christmas classics and originals." Riff magazine's Sery Morales felt that the album "showcases Brandy’s signature style of warm soulful vocals, as well as a willingness to experiment" and "successfully infuses her soulful singing into both original and classic holiday tracks." Jim Harrington, writing for Mercury News, called Christmas with Brandy a "worthwhile experience for fans of smooth R&B/pop. It’s a nice enough collection of holiday tunes, ranging from a somewhat forgettable lead single [...] to enjoyable covers." Similarly, Gazette critic Alan Sculley noted that "the original material (including the sexy, silky ballad "Christmas Party for Two" and the bouncy "Christmas Gift") makes Christmas with Brandy an album worth noticing."

== Commercial performance ==
Christmas with Brandy debuted at number 29 on the US Top Holiday Albums in the week dated November 25, 2023. It also reached number 50 on Billboard's Current Album Sales chart.

== Track listing ==
Christmas with Brandy track listing
No.	Title	Writer(s)	Producer(s)	Length
1.	"Feels Different"	Brandy Norwood; Theron Feemster; Sebastian Kole; David Williams II	Feemster; Williams; Jaha Johnson^{[b]}	2:56
2.	"Somebody’s Waiting"	Norwood; Darhyl Camper; Sean Wander; Vania Khaleh-Pari; Xenia Karungu	DJ Camper; Johnson^{[b]}	3:01
3.	"Christmas Party for Two"	Norwood; Feemster; Kole; Williams	Feemster; Williams; Kyle Mann^{[a]}; Johnson^{[b]}	3:54
4.	"Have Yourself a Merry Little Christmas"	Hugh Martin; Ralph Blane	Feemster; Williams; Johnson; Mann	3:32
5.	"Santa Baby"	Joan Javits; Philip Springer; Tony Springer	Feemster; Williams^{[a]}; Johnson^{[b]}	3:31
6.	"Christmas Gift" (featuring Sy'rai)	Norwood; Feemster; Kole; Mann; Williams	Feemster; Johnson^{[b]}	4:12
7.	"Shine Out Your Light"	Norwood; Feemster; Kole	Feemster; Williams^{[a]}; Johnson^{[b]}	2:37
8.	"The Christmas Song"	Robert Wells; Mel Tormé	Feemster; Williams^{[a]}; Johnson^{[b]}	3:10
9.	"Someday at Christmas"	Ron Miller; Bryan Wells	Feemster; Williams^{[a]}; Johnson^{[b]}	2:56
10.	"Jingle Bells"	James Lord Pierpont	Feemster; Williams^{[a]}; Johnson^{[b]}	2:50
11.	"Deck the Halls"	John Thomas; Thomas Oliphant	Feemster; Johnson^{[b]}	2:28
Total length:				35:07

Digital bonus track
No.	Title	Writer(s)	Producer(s)	Length
12.	"Christmas Everyday"	Adam Messinger; Nasri Atweh; Norwood	Messinger; Atweh	3:26
Total length:				38:33

Notes

- ^{^[a]} signifies additional producer(s)
- ^{^[b]} signifies associate producer(s)

== Charts ==
Chart performance for Christmas with Brandy
Chart (2023)	Peak position
US Top Current Album Sales (Billboard)	50
US Top Holiday Albums (Billboard)	29

== Release history ==
Release dates and formats for Christmas with Brandy
Region	Date	Format(s)	Label(s)	Ref.
Various	November 10, 2023	CD; digital download; streaming; vinyl	Brand Nu; Motown	
