= Let's Get It In =

Single by Lloyd featuring 50 Cent
- Released: September 27, 2010
- Recorded: 2010
- Genre: R&B; hip hop
- Length: 3:26
- Label: Young Goldie; Zone 4; Interscope
- Songwriters: Kenneth Pratt; Lloyd Polite; Curtis Jackson; Jamal Jones; Rob Holladay
- Producers: Polow Da Don; Rob Holladay

Lloyd singles chronology
"Lay It Down" (2010)	"Let's Get It In" (2010)	"Cupid" (2011)

50 Cent singles chronology
"Down On Me" (2010)	"Let's Get It In" (2010)	"Here We Go Again" (2010)

"Let's Get It In" is a promotional single from R&B singer Lloyd Rob Holladay and Polow Da Don are the co-producers of the track, which features rapper 50 Cent. The song was to be the second single from King of Hearts but plans was dropped and did not appear on the album. The song was released officially as a digital download on iTunes on October 25, 2010.

== Background ==
On Twitter Lloyd reported that his second single from the album would feature an artist who he has always wanted to work with. Rumours were that it was rapper 50 Cent, this was later confirmed when he posted the song on his webpage.

Lloyd has previously stated on Twitter that he had always wanted to work with 50 Cent and create a "club banger".

== Music video ==
The video for the single with G-Unit boss was shot in Atlanta during the BET Hip Hop Awards weekend. It premiered on December 8, 2010, at BET's 106 & Park. The video has peaked at #8 on the show. The music video is set in a night club and it is directed by Colin Tilley.

The music video on YouTube has received over 3 million views as of April 2024.

== Chart position ==
Chart (2010)	Peak position
U.S. Bubbling Under Hot 100 Singles	25
U.S. Bubbling Under R&B/Hip-Hop Singles	2
