= Talk to Me (Brandy, Ray J and Willie Norwood song) =

Single by Brandy, Ray J and Willie Norwood

from the album A Family Business
- Released: October 22, 2010
- Genre: R&B; soul
- Length: 4:51
- Label: Saguaro Road
- Songwriters: William Ray Norwood Jr., Scott Parker; Tommy Niblack
- Producer: Scott "Shavoni" Parker

Brandy singles chronology
"Long Distance" (2008)	"Talk to Me" (2010)	"It All Belongs to Me" (2012)

Ray J singles chronology
"Last Wish" (2010)	"Talk to Me" (2010)	"Turnin' Me On" (2011)

Audio video
- "Talk to Me" on YouTube

"Talk to Me" is a song by American recording artists Brandy, Ray J and Willie Norwood. It was written by Scott "Shavoni" Parker and Tommy Niblack, while production was overseen by the former. Based on the American reality series Brandy and Ray J: A Family Business which aired on the VH1 network between the years of 2010 and 2011, it was released by Saguaro Road Records as the first single from the A Family Business soundtrack which accompanied the series' second season.

== Critical reception ==
"Talk to Me" garnered generally negative reviews from music critics. Jon O'Brien from AllMusic found the ballad schmaltzy and wrote that it is the "type of gloopy sub-Disney ballad you'd have expected to hear on Brandy's late-'90s Cinderella remake." Chuck Campbell from the Scripps Howard News Service, writing for The Telegraph Encore, declared "Talk to Me" a "generic slow song that degenerates into a wail-off among the three singers."

== Track listing ==
Digital single
No.	Title	Length
1.	"Talk to Me" (radio edit)	4:13
2.	"Talk to Me" (album version)	4:51

== Charts ==
Chart performance for "Talk to Me"
Chart (2010)	Peak position
US Adult R&B Songs (Billboard)	37
