= Kyle Mann =

American recording engineer

- Born: Philadelphia, PA
- Genres: R&B; Pop; Rock
- Occupations: Audio Engineer; Music Producer; Songwriter; Musician; Acoustician
- Instruments: Bass; Guitar; Keyboard; Drums; Vocals
- Years active: 2005–present

Kyle Mann is a Los Angeles, California–based recording engineer, music producer, and mixer.

Kyle currently works out of Speakeasy Sound in Burbank, California.

He was awarded the 2024 Grammy Award for Best Engineered Album, Non-Classical for the album Jaguar II.

== Selected discography ==
Artist	Year	Album/Single	
Lunchmoney Lewis	2015	Bills	Engineer
Nico & Vinz	2017	Elephant in the Room	Mixer
ZZ Ward	2017	The Storm	Engineer
Camila Cabello	2018	Havana	Engineer
The New Respects	2018	Before the Sun Goes Down	Engineer/Mixer
Leslie Odom Jr.	2021	Speak Now	Engineer/Mixer
Ariana Grande	2019	Monopoly	Engineer/Mixer
Leslie Odom Jr.	2019	Mr.	Producer/Engineer/Mixer
Andy Grammer	2022	Art of Joy	Engineer
Brandy Norwood	2023	Christmas With Brandy	Producer/Engineer/Mixer
Victoria Monét	2023	Jaguar II	Engineer
Billy Joel	2024	Turn the Lights Back On	Engineer
