= A Family Business =

Soundtrack album by Various artists
- Released: June 19, 2011
- Recorded: 2009–2011
- Length: 40:46
- Labels: Saguaro Road; Time–Life; Knockout

Singles from A Family Business
- 1. "Talk to Me" Released: November 22, 2010

A Family Business a 2011 compilation album released on Saguaro Road Records and Time–Life Music. Based on the American reality series Brandy & Ray J: A Family Business which aired on the VH1 network between the years of 2010 and 2011, it was released as a soundtrack accompanying the series' second and final season. Executive produced by the Norwood family, the show chronicled the backstage lives of singers Ray J and Brandy Norwood, while taking on larger roles in their family's management and production company, R&B Productions.

The album features previously unreleased content from both siblings and their parents Sonja and Willie Norwood as well as contribution from Brandy's daughter Sy'rai, her half-sister Rain Smith, and fellow singers such as Tasha Scott. Production on the compilation was handled by several producers, including Big Bert, Clinton Sparks, and The Jam. Upon release, critics such as The Washington Post declared it an "awkward and adorable and really, really wholesome collection."

== Background and development ==
Collaborative efforts between Brandy Norwood and her brother, fellow R&B singer Ray J, had been in talks since 2005, when Brandy was firstly signed to Ray J's record company Knockout Entertainment. It was announced that the siblings along with rapper Shorty Mack and other performers, would form a supergroup called TKO (Tha Knock Out) and release a debut album of the same name in 2006. Plans eventually fell through though, also because Brandy was involved in a fatal car crash. It wasn't until late 2008 when further news surfaced about a collaboration project between Brandy and Ray J. Billboard reported that the singers considered releasing an album called R&B, "a nod to the siblings' respective first initials as well as their chosen style of music." Yet again after the commercial failure of Brandy's Human (2008) album, this project was postponed.

In early 2010, VH1 reality show Brandy & Ray J: A Family Business was announced and in addition to starring siblings Ray J and Brandy, their parents Willie Norwood and Sonja Bates-Norwood were also set to appear. In June, Ray J announced that the title of the collaborative album would be named TKO – Trust, Knowledge & Opportunity. The label Time-Life was announced as well as the fact that it was no longer going to be a duet album but more of a "spiritual, feel-good [family] album". By August 2010 the first studio footage of Brandy recording the album was released to the internet. While Billboard announced Brandy's song "Lifeguard" to be the project's lead single, it was the Brandy, Ray J and Willie Norwood collaboration "Talk to Me" which was eventually released as the album's first single on November 22, 2010. It failed to enter any Billboard chart. Even though the album was first announced to be released in March 2011 to coincide with the second season of Brandy and Ray J: A Family Business, it was not until June that the album was made available for purchase.

== Critical reception ==
Professional ratings
Review scores
Source	Rating
AllMusic	2.5/5 stars
Blues & Soul	10/10 stars
Channel 24	2/5 stars
MOBO	4/5 stars
Soultracks.com	favorable
The Telegraph Encore	3/5 stars
The Washington Post	mixed

Upon release, A Family Business earned generally mixed reviews by critics. Jon O'Brien from AllMusic applauded Brandy's tracks but found the album schmaltzy, commenting "while it's likely to provide several "oohs" and "aahs" at a Norwood family get-together, for outsiders it's a sickly sweet affair proving that Brandy is their only real and genuine star." Allison Stewart, writer for The Washington Post, declared it an "awkward and adorable and really, really wholesome collection", and added: "Brandy's solo tracks are welcome reminders of what a great voice she has." Less enthusiastic with the remaining tracks, she wrote: "Ray's Chris Brown-goes-to-the-disco tracks are less essential and everything else is critic-proof. Who's going to criticize Brandy's daughter, Sy'rai Smith, blithely autotuning her way through a pint-size banger about how much she loves her family — even though it's awful?"

Melody Charles from Soultracks also praised Brandy's contribution to the compilation, but was critical of the rest. She wrote that "except for the bittersweet number, 'Gone', which is sung by Tasha Scott the rest of the CD fumbles around between 'hit' and 'miss'. Ray J's contributions seem to exist only as reinforcement of his infamously-earned lady-killer image and are too overloaded by Auto-Tune to showcase his true vocal ability, as is the TV show's theme." Charles concluded that "if you're a fan of the VH1 series, then there are gems on this CD that will deepen your appreciation for the bond that the Norwoods have maintained under the glaring spotlight. Otherwise, those waiting for what Brandy and Ray J are cooking up next will simply regard this collection as a passable distraction." Similarly, Chuck Campbell from the Scripps Howard News Service wrote for The Telegraph Encore that "overall, the collection is serviceable, if gratuitous, and notable only for possibly generating interest in a new Brandy album."

== Singles ==
- The first single from the album, "Talk to Me", an R&B/pop ballad with vocals by Brandy, Ray J, and Willie Norwood, was released to digital outlets and radio on November 22, 2010.
- The dance pop song "Turnin' Me On" by Ray J was released as the second single on May 3, 2011.
- "Gone" by Tasha Scott was released as the compilation's third single on July 26, 2011. It also the singer-actress' debut single.

== Track listing ==
No.	Title	Writer(s)	Artist(s)	Length
1.	"A Family Business" (aka "Family Business Theme")	Brandy Norwood; Willie Norwood, Jr.; A. Aiken; C. Ross; Willie Norwood, Sr.	Brandy; Ray J; Willie Norwood, Sr; Sonja Norwood	4:41
2.	"Turnin' Me On"	Aaron Fresh; Jordan Omley; Michael Mani	Ray J	3:17
3.	"Talk to Me"	Scott "Shavoni" Parker; Tommy Niblack	Brandy; Ray J; Willie Norwood Sr.	4:52
4.	"My Family"	Robert Smith	Sy'rai; Rain Smith	3:22
5.	"Lifeguard"	Omley; Mani; Antonio Rayo	Brandy	4:01
6.	"Ready to Roll" (featuring Shorty Mack & TKO)	Norwood, Jr.; Derrelle Owens; S. Singh; Stefvon Kowlessar	Ray J	4:16
7.	"Sonja Sonia Sonya"	C. Johnson; Norwood, Sr.	Willie Norwood, Sr.	2:59
8.	"Gone"	Tasha Scott; Darion Harris; Anthony Saunders; Lamar Tribble; Samuel Simpson; Candace Moore; Robert Normon	Tasha Scott	4:23
9.	"I Don't Care"	Stacy Barthe; Corey Gibson; Clinton Sparks; B. Norwood; Grigancine	Brandy	3:21
10.	"Home Grown"	M. Green; Norwood, Sr.	Willie Norwood, Sr	4:37
11.	"Epilogue"	Vini Reilly	Sonja Norwood	1:01

== Release history ==
A Family Business release history
Region	Format(s)	Date	Label(s)
France	CD; digital download	June 10, 2011	Rhino
United Kingdom	CD; digital download	June 10, 2011	Rhino
United States	CD; digital download	July 26, 2011	Saguaro Road; Time–Life; Knockout
Germany	CD; digital download	July 26, 2011	Saguaro Road; Time–Life; Knockout
