= Sy'Rai Smith =

American singer-songwriter (born 2002)

- Born: Sy'Rai Iman Smith; June 16, 2002 (age 24); Los Angeles, California, U.S.
- Other name: Sy'Rai
- Occupations: Singer, songwriter
- Years active: 2020–present
- Parents: Brandy; Big Bert
- Relatives: Ray J (uncle); Willie Norwood (maternal grandfather)

Sy'Rai Iman Smith (born June 16, 2002) is an American singer and songwriter.

== Early life ==
Smith was born on June 16, 2002, to American singer and actress Brandy and record producer Robert "Big Bert" Smith. Her parents separated when Smith was one year old. In 2011, Smith contributed vocals to the song "My Family" on her family's album, A Family Business.

== Career ==
=== 2020-present: Career beginnings ===
In July 2020, Smith featured on Brandy's seventh studio album B7, on the track "High Heels".

A debut EP was first announced in 2021, with confirmation from Smith herself in 2023 that an EP was coming; however, as of August 2025, no EP has been released.

In March 2022, Smith was featured on a duet with Brandy; "Nothing Without You" was taken from the soundtrack to the film Cheaper by the Dozen. In a November 2022 interview with Atlanta Black Star, Smith shared her feelings on people comparing her to her mother, stating, "When you have such a legacy, you do feel a lot more pressure than an upcoming artist that doesn't [...] I just really want people to understand that there is a difference. ... I mean, who wouldn't want to be compared to my mom? ... It is a lot of pressure to exceed someone's expectations when they already set something so high."

On May 5, 2023, Smith released her debut solo single, "On My Own". In late 2023, Smith was featured on "Christmas Gift", a song on Brandy's eighth studio album, Christmas with Brandy.

In 2024, Smith continued her solo singing career with her second single on April 26, 2024, "Not About You". Smith released the single "Bad Guy" on December 6, 2024.

On July 23, 2025, it was announced that Smith would star in the Lifetime film Christmas Everyday, alongside her mother, in her acting debut. The film premiered on November 10, 2025, with the full release on November 29, 2025.

On August 28, 2026, Smith released her debut EP, Cold War, which was preceded by two singles: "Late Night" and "Bullseye (Nice Shot)". She appeared on The Breakfast Club to promote the EP.

== Personal life ==
In 2025, Smith graduated from the Los Angeles Film School with a bachelor's degree in entertainment business.

== Discography ==
=== Extended plays ===
- Cold War (2026)

=== Singles ===
List of singles as lead artist, showing year released and originating album
Title	Year	Album
"At Your Best"	2020	Non-album singles
"On My Own"	2023	Non-album singles
"Bad Guy"	2024	Non-album singles
"Not About You"	2024	Non-album singles
"Late Night"	2026	Cold War
"Bullseye (Nice Shot)"	2026	Cold War

=== Promotional singles ===
List of singles as lead artist, showing year released and originating album
Title	Year	Album
"Nothing Without You" (with Brandy)	2022	Cheaper by the Dozen OST

=== Album appearances ===
Title	Year	Album
"My Family"	2011	A Family Business
"High Heels"(with Brandy)	2020	B7
"Christmas Gift"(with Brandy)	2023	Christmas with Brandy

== Filmography ==
Film
Year	Title	Role	Notes
2025	Christmas Everyday	Belle	Lifetime television film

Television
Year	Title	Role	Notes
2002	Brandy: Special Delivery	Herself	
