= Willie Norwood =

American gospel singer (born 1955)

- Born: William Ray Norwood; November 30, 1955 (age 70); Cleveland, Ohio, U.S.
- Origin: Greenwood, Mississippi, U.S.
- Genres: Gospel; soul; R&B
- Occupations: Singer, songwriter, record producer, vocal assistance, choir
- Years active: 1975–present
- Labels: Atlantic (2000–2002); Knockout Gospel (2005–present)

William Ray Norwood Sr. (born November 30, 1955) is an American gospel singer. He is the father and voice coach of R&B singers Brandy and Ray J.

== Career ==
=== 1975–1992: Early career ===
Willie Norwood's career in the music industry began at Jackson State University on a band scholarship during the 1970s where he joined a soul music group named The Composers, becoming their lead vocalist and trumpeter. The group found a modicum of success playing the Mississippi club scene and began opening up for acts such as Rufus and Chaka Khan and Lou Rawls. Norwood soon moved to Hollywood with the group where they attracted a loyal following.

The fast-paced Hollywood scene caused Norwood to stray from his religious upbringing, causing him and his wife, Sonja Bates-Norwood, to move back to McComb, Mississippi, in the late 1970s to begin a family as well as to regain focus. He began working with local community choirs in Los Angeles while beginning post-graduate work at California State University. Norwood's work with the choirs afforded a young Brandy and Ray J the opportunity to enhance their blooming musical interest.

=== 2001–2004: Commercial debut ===
After putting together Brandy's Never-Say-Never World Tour, his first commercial album, Bout It was released in late 2001 under Atlantic Records, receiving a Dove Award nomination, and peaking at Number 13 on the Billboard Gospel Chart. Brandy was featured on the album, and such artists as Kirk Whalum, Billy Preston, The William Brothers, Ray J and Angie Winans.

Brandy and Ray J appeared as background vocals on Bout It. Whalum played saxophone and Preston sang on "I’ll Trade A Lifetime" and "Bout It". The Williams Brothers, who wrote and produced the title track and "The Search Is Over," also provided background vocals. "A Love Shared" was written by Angie Winans.

Norwood started working with Ray J and Brandy in the studio for their upcoming albums. He split with Atlantic Records in 2002.

=== 2005–2007: New label and I Believe album ===
Norwood's second album I Believe was released on May 22, 2006, under new label Knockout Entertainment. It is a definitive and eclectic blend of a cappella Southern gospel songs. Norwood set up the KnockOut Vocal Studio in North Hollywood, CA and brought his Southern charm to a 12-song a cappella gospel interpretation of "old church" songs. After the release has he focused on the work as director to the group UCC, a 94-voice youth choir in South Central L.A. and minister of music at the Woodland Hills Church of Christ.

=== 2010-2011 Brandy & Ray J: A Family Business ===
Along with wife Sonia, Norwood appeared in Brandy & Ray J: A Family Business. The series follows his children as they overcome the daily struggles in their family business and follows their daily lives.

A compilation album, A Family Business, was released on June 19, 2011, to accompany the series. The album features previously unreleased content from Norwood, Sonja, Brandy and Ray J, as well as contribution from Brandy's daughter Sy'rai, her half-sister Rain Smith, and fellow singers such as Tasha Scott. Production on the compilation was handled by several producers, including Big Bert, Clinton Sparks, and The Jam. Upon release, critics such as The Washington Post declared it an "awkward and adorable and really, really wholesome collection."

=== 2013: Christmas EP ===
On November 19, 2013, Norwood released a three-track EP titled Merry Christmas. It featured a duet with Ray J, "Noel".

=== 2020: B7 ===
Norwood is credited as vocal coach on his daughter's seventh studio album, B7.

== Personal life ==
Norwood, a member of Omega Psi Phi (1978 YE - Jackson State University), married Sonja Bates and had two children: Brandy Rayana on February 11, 1979, and Willie Ray, known as Ray J, on January 17, 1981. Norwood raised his children in a Christian home. His daughter started singing through his work as part of the local church choir, performing her first gospel solo at the age of two.

Norwood became a grandfather to Brandy's only child on June 16, 2002, when Brandy gave birth to a daughter, Sy'rai Iman Smith. Norwood's son had two children with wife Princess Love: a daughter, Melody Love, born on May 22, 2018, and a son, Epik Ray, born on January 7, 2020.

== Discography ==
- 2001: Bout It
- 2006: I Believe
- 2011: A Family Business
- 2013: Merry Christmas – EP
