= Bout It =

Studio album by Willie Norwood
- Released: October 23, 2001; April 11, 2010 (re-release)
- Recorded: 2000
- Genre: Gospel
- Label: Atlantic
- Producer: Stephen Lu, Doug Williams, Melvin Williams

Willie Norwood chronology
| Bout It (2001) | I Believe (2006) |

Alternative cover
- 2010 re-release cover

Professional ratings
Review scores
| Source | Rating |
|---|---|
| CD Baby | 5/5 stars |
| Allmusic | 4/5 stars |

Bout It is the debut album by American Gospel singer Willie Norwood. It was released on October 23, 2001 and received little commercial success.

== Content ==
It encompasses a gamut of musical styles: soul and pop as well as traditional gospel. Featured are covers of the Stevie Wonder gospel composition "Have a Talk With God," along with the Jackie DeShannon-penned inspirational classic, "Put a Little Love in Your Heart." The hymn "Have Thine Own Way" pairs Norwood with Hip hop artist Ray J vocally. Popular gospel group the Williams Brothers penned and contributed backing vocals to the tracks "The Search Is Over" and "No Limit." The gospel classic "I'd Trade a Lifetime" takes Norwood back to his early years in the church. The track features a guest appearance from keyboardist Billy Preston. He also teams up with his daughter R&B/pop singer Brandy on the track "A Love Shared." The track also features sax work from Kirk Whalum.

== Track listing ==
1. "Bout It" (featuring Brandy & Ray J) (Carter) – 4:48
2. "Have A Talk With God" (Hardaway, Wonder) – 3:54
3. "A Love Shared" (featuring Brandy & Kirk Whalum) (Caldwell, Caldwell, Winans) – 4:01
4. "Put A Little Love In Your Heart" (DeShannon, Holiday, Myers) – 3:48
5. "I'm Gonna Make It" (Caldwell, Caldwell, Winans) – 4:12
6. "No Limit" (Williams, Williams) – 4:26
7. "Have Thine Own Way" (featuring Ray J) (Caldwell, Caldwell) – 4:23
8. "I'd Trade A Lifetime" (Bradley) (featuring Billy Preston) – 4:05
9. "The Search Is Over" (Horne, Williams ) – 5:21
10. "All That I Need" (Lu, Norwood) – 3:54
11. "'Bout It" (Reprise) (Carter) – 0:40

== Charts ==
| Chart (2001) | Peak position |
|---|---|
| US Top Gospel Albums (Billboard) | 13 |
