= Best. Christmas. Ever! =

2023 film by Mary Lambert

- Release poster
- Directed by: Mary Lambert
- Screenplay by: Todd Calgi Gallicano; Charles Shyer
- Story by: Todd Calgi Gallicano
- Produced by: Brad Krevoy
- Starring: Heather Graham; Brandy Norwood; Matt Cedeño; Jason Biggs
- Cinematography: Graham Robbins
- Edited by: Jeffrey Wolf
- Music by: Jeff Rona
- Production companies: Motion Picture Corporation of America; Brad Krevoy Productions
- Distributed by: Netflix
- Release date: November 16, 2023
- Running time: 81 minutes
- Country: United States
- Language: English

Best. Christmas. Ever! is a 2023 American Christmas romantic comedy film directed by Mary Lambert and written by Todd Gallicano and Charles Shyer. The film stars Heather Graham, Brandy Norwood, Matt Cedeño, and Jason Biggs.

Jackie Jennings' boastful holiday newsletter aggravates struggling Charlotte Sanders, so when they find themselves spending Christmas together with their families, Charlotte sets out to prove her seeming rival's life is not so perfect.

Released on Netflix on November 16, 2023, Best. Christmas. Ever! received generally negative reviews from critics.

== Plot ==
Charlotte and Rob Sanders live modestly in a small apartment, so she feel overshadowed by the seemingly perfect life of her college friend, Jackie Jennings. Jackie's annual Christmas letter, detailing her family's extraordinary achievements, incites envy and skepticism in Charlotte. She showcases her daughter's Beatrix extraordinary intelligence and her son's Daniel wishes to change the world as he travels.

Charlotte, feeling her own family is unremarkable, describes her daughter Dora's obsession with Marvel comics, her son Grant's attachment to a stuffed monkey, Rob's impractical dream of house flipping, and her own abandoned inventor dreams. Grant, misunderstanding his mother's sarcasm, navigates the family to the Jennings' home for Christmas rather than her sister Stacy's as planned.

Planning to head out early the next day, the Sanders get snowed in and are forced to stay. After an outing to get a Christmas tree, Charlotte finds a letter addressed to Jackie from Rob. As the two once dated, Charlotte's suspicions of them grows. Her distrust leads her to leave everyone in the town square under the guise of getting a last-minute gift. Charlotte then searches their house, trying to find a flaw.

While Charlotte is snooping at the Jenning's house, Valentino kicks her, thinking she is a thief. Jackie confronts Charlotte about her behavior. Charlotte accuses Jackie and Rob of having an affair, based on misinterpreted correspondence.

Rob reveals he has been sending family Christmas letters for years. He kept them secret from her due to her known disdain for them. Charlotte then accidentally smashes a dollhouse Jackie rebuilt as a Christmas gift for Valentino to the floor. She then prepares to leave, as she believes her destroying the dollhouse was unforgivable.

Jackie begs Charlotte to stay, telling her it is okay to make mistakes, as friendship is more important than objects. Then, they go together to a bank downtown, where 10-year-old Beatrix helps Charlotte get a low, fixed interest rate for Rob's dream house. Soon after, Charlotte's company implodes due to them putting a faulty vacuum cleaner on the market, against her warnings.

As Charlotte is driving to cancel the mortgage, the car slips off the road. Before she gets back on track, she encounters Jackie's friend Rose, who thanks her for spending the holidays with the Jennings, as this time of the year is very difficult for them. Charlotte soon sees a billboard for the Daniel Jennings Memorial Foundation.

Realizing Daniel actually died, Charlotte returns to the house. She enters his locked bedroom, and Jackie follows her in. She explains what happened to Daniel, telling Charlotte she created the foundation to keep his memory alive and help her family pull through the tragedy.

As a tribute to her late son, Jackie worked with Rose, also from the aviation company she pre-retired from, to design the first-ever solar-powered hot air balloon. She put the North Star on its side that lights up. Jackie plans to fly it near the Christmas pageant to include Daniel in it.

When Jackie has a technical problem, the engineer Charlotte helps solve it. She then hitches a ride on the bottom of the rope ladder towards the pageant. Flying too low, it catches on the Santa's sleigh decoration from the Jennings' roof which attaches to the balloon. As they approach the show, the kids' belief in Santa is restored.

In the epilogue, the Sanders and Jennings families collaborate on a joint Christmas letter. Charlotte boasts about her new invention, while the Jennings promote their NGO through solar-powered hot air balloon travel.

== Cast ==
- Heather Graham as Charlotte Sanders
- Brandy Norwood as Jackie Jennings
- Jason Biggs as Rob Sanders
- Matt Cedeño as Valentino
- Wyatt Hunt as Grant Sanders
- Abby Villasmil as Dora Sanders
- Madison Skye Validum as Beatrix Jennings
- Nadia Sine as Rose McCaffrey
- Janet Lo as Keiko

== Release ==
Best. Christmas. Ever. was released by Netflix on November 16, 2023. It debuted at number 1 on the streaming service and number 2 globally with 22.3 million hours for a total of 16.3 million views. This ranks second in the Global Top 10 behind David Fincher's The Killer.

== Reception ==
On the review aggregator website Rotten Tomatoes, 38% of 21 critics' reviews are positive, with an average rating of 4.4/10. Metacritic, which uses a weighted average, assigned the film a score of 34 out of 100, based on 6 critics, indicating "generally unfavorable" reviews.

Variety wrote "Its absurdist lunacy acts as a Trojan Horse containing genuinely meaningful sentiments on forgiveness, happiness and bittersweet sorrows — universalities people tend to reflect on as their year comes to a close".
