= Matt Cedeño =

American actor and model

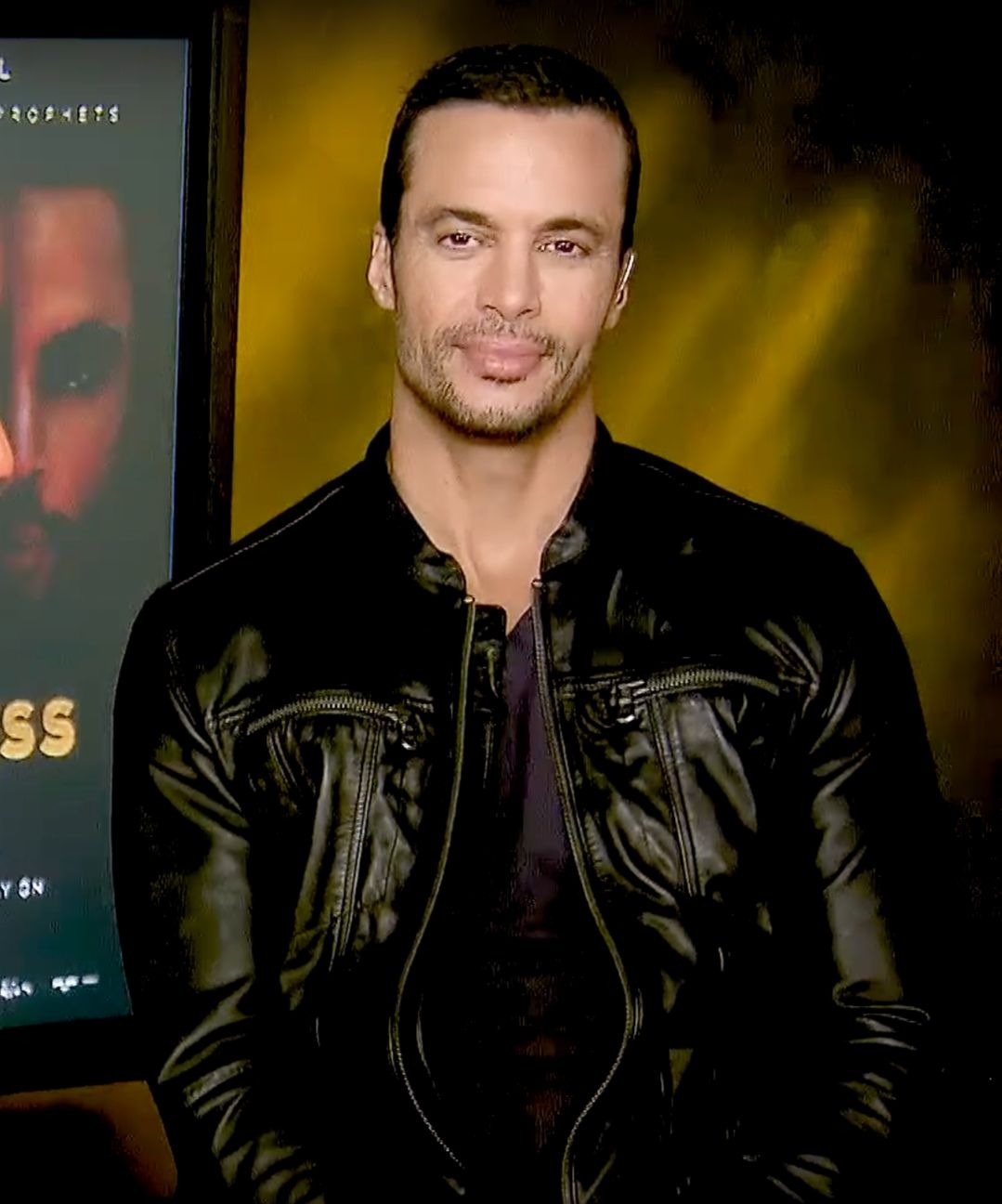
- Cedeño in 2020
- Born: November 14, 1973 (age 52); Moses Lake, Washington, U.S.
- Occupation: Actor
- Height: 1.88 m (6 ft 2 in)
- Spouse: Erica Franco (m. 2009)
- Children: 2

Matt Cedeño (born November 14, 1973) is an American actor and former fashion model, known for his roles as Brandon Walker on the NBC daytime soap opera Days of Our Lives (1999–2005, 2026-), Alejandro Rubio in the Lifetime primetime comedy-drama Devious Maids (2013–2014), Vasquez on Syfy comedy horror Z Nation (2015–16), and The Highest in the BET+ soap opera Ruthless.

== Personal life ==
Cedeño was born in Moses Lake, Washington, to an Afro-Cuban father and an Irish-English mother. He became a model doing gigs in Milan, Spain, New York and Los Angeles, which Cedeño juggled, along with academics, until he finished school. Cedeño married Erica Franco on July 31, 2009, and their son, Jaxson Cruz, was born on August 7, 2013. They welcomed their daughter, Aviana Jaselle on April 28, 2018.

== Career ==
Cedeño is known for his role as Brandon Walker on the NBC daytime soap opera Days of Our Lives from 1999 to 2005. He has been nominated three years in a row for an ALMA award as Outstanding Actor in a Daytime Drama for his work as Walker on Days of our Lives. Cedeño will be returning in April 2026 in a storyline tied to his on-screen character Brandon's ex wife and rekindled love interest, Sami. He played a young boxer in the 2000 feature film Price of Glory (Jimmy Smits plays the same character years later). He guest-starred on Boy Meets World, CSI: Miami, It's Always Sunny in Philadelphia, and The Mentalist.

Cedeño appeared on the one hundredth episode of ABC comedy-drama series Desperate Housewives as Umberto Rothwell, the gay husband of Edie Britt (Nicollette Sheridan). In 2013, he had a recurring role in the Lifetime comedy-drama Devious Maids during season 1 and part of season 2, playing another gay character called Alejandro Rubio. However his character was killed off in season 2.

Cedeño starred in the Syfy television series Z Nation from 2015 to 2016. He had a recurring roles on Oprah Winfrey Network prime time soap opera Ambitions and Starz drama Power. In 2020, Cedeño was cast in the BET+ soap opera Ruthless, a show about a religious sex cult.

In 2023, Cedeño starred as Valentino in the Netflix Christmas-themed film Best. Christmas. Ever! alongside Brandy, Heather Graham and Jason Biggs.

== Filmography ==
=== Films ===
Year	Name	Role	Notes
1999	The Suburbans	Tito	
2000	28 Days	Bob Ramirez	
2000	Price of Glory	Young Arturo Ortega	
2000	Days of Innocence	Michael Moreno	
2002	Are You a Serial Killer	Rick	Short
2005	Romancing the Bride	Carlos	TV movie
2006	Hoboken Hollow	Hitchhiker #1	
2006	Hot Tamale	Caesar Lopez	
2010	Baby	Nick	Short
2012	Retribution	Ray Martinez	TV movie
2012	K-11	Booking Sergeant	
2012	Sperm Donor	Jackson	Short
2018	Blood, Sweat, and Lies	Adam	TV movie
2020	Open	Mars	TV movie
2021	Deadly Excursion: Kidnapped From the Beach	Cesar Rodriguez	TV movie
2023	Best. Christmas. Ever!	Valentino	Netflix Christmas film

=== Television ===
Year	TV Series	Role	Notes
1997	Life with Roger	Kyle	Episode: "The Boxer Rebellion"
1997	Boy Meets World	Sergio	Episode: "Last Tango in Philly"
1999–2005	Days of Our Lives	Brandon Walker	Regular Cast
2005	CSI: Miami	Gary	Episode: "10-7"
2006	Half & Half	Franco	Episode: "The Big My Funny Valentine Episode"
2006	That '70s Show	Indian	Episode: "We Will Rock You"
2006	The War at Home	Police Officer	Episode: "Love Is Blind"
2007	It's Always Sunny in Philadelphia	Rico	Episode: "The Gang Gets Whacked: Part 1"
2008	Psych	Jorge Gama-Lobo	Episode: "Lights, Camera... Homicidio"
2009	Desperate Housewives	Umberto Rothwell	Episode: "The Best Thing That Ever Could Have Happened"
2009	Brothers	Jesus	Episode: "Mike's Comeback"
2009	The Mentalist	Narcisco Rubrero	Episode: "Throwing Fire"
2011	Melissa & Joey	Gustavo Carvallho	Episode: "Joe Versus the Reunion"
2012	Common Law	Tango Phil	Episode: "Soul Mates"
2013	Anger Management	Gonzalo	Episode: "Charlie's Dad Breaks Bad"
2013–14	Devious Maids	Alejandro Rubio	Recurring cast: Season 1–2
2014	Baby Daddy	Javier	Episode: "Strip or Treat"
2015	Rosewood	Chuy Mendez	Episode: "Fashionistas and Fasciitis"
2015–16	Z Nation	Javier Vasquez	Main cast: season 2, guest: season 3
2015–18	Power	Diego "Cristobal" Martinez	Recurring cast: season 2-3, main cast: season 4-5
2016	The Originals	Gaspar Cortez	Episode: "An Old Friend Calls"
2019	Ambitions	Ignacio De Santos	Recurring cast
2020–	Ruthless	The Highest/Tyrone Luckett	Main cast
2021	Mom	Vincent	Episode: "Endorphins and a Toasty Tushy"
2021	Truth Be Told	Nando Quezado	Recurring cast: season 2
2022	Promised Land	Tomas Gutierrez	Recurring cast
TBA	Power: Legacy	Diego "Cristobal" Martinez	Future guest appearances

== See also ==
- List of Afro-Latinos
