= Progressive Conservative Party of Manitoba candidates in the 1969 Manitoba provincial election =

The Progressive Conservative Party of Manitoba ran a full slate of 57 candidates in the 1969 Manitoba general election, and won 22 seats to emerge as the second-largest party in the legislature. When the New Democratic Party was able to form a minority government under Edward Schreyer, the Progressive Conservatives became the Official Opposition.

Many of the party's candidates have their own biography pages; information about others may be found here. This page also includes information about Progressive Conservative candidates in by-elections between 1969 and 1973.

== By-elections ==
=== St. Vital, April 5, 1971: Kenneth Pratt ===
Kenneth Pratt focused his campaign around opposition to the Schreyer government's plan to amalgamate the City of Winnipeg with surrounding municipalities, including St. Vital. He received 2,925 votes (31.12%), finishing third in a close contest against successful New Democratic Party candidate Jim Walding and a Liberal candidate who also opposed amalgamation. After the election, he said that the result "shows the majority of the people are against the government and the one-city plan".
