= Big Bert =

American songwriter

- Also known as: Big Bert
- Born: Robert Anthony Smith; February 11, 1979 (age 47); Atlantic City, New Jersey
- Genres: R&B, pop, hip hop, urban pop, dance-pop
- Occupations: Record producer, songwriter, composer, musician
- Years active: 2000–present
- Spouse: Xochitl Jacques-Smith
- Website: BigBertEntertainment.com
- Children: Sy'Rai Smith

Robert Anthony Smith (born February 11, 1979), also known as Big Bert, is an American record producer, songwriter and musician.

== Early life ==
Smith was born in Atlantic City, New Jersey. His father was a preacher and business owner, who had a trucking company. Smith is a cousin of music producer Rodney "Darkchild" Jerkins, his older brother Fred and their sisters Sharene and Sybil. As a child, he began playing the piano or drum set at church, while his brothers and sisters were singing. The family had a vacation home in Marion County, Florida, where they often resided.

== Career ==
Smith began producing at the age of 15. In 2000, Jerkins asked Smith to work with him on a remix of Spanish singer Enrique Iglesias's single "Sad Eyes." Following his contribution, Smith completed highschool and relocated to Los Angeles where he joined Jerkins' Darkchild collective. One of his first projects was Michael Jackson's tenth studio album Invincible He went on to co-produce alongside Jerkins on tracks for bands like B2K and the Spice Girls, prior to contributing to projects by Dave Hollister, Toni Braxton, and Kelly Rowland. In 2020, Smith co-founded the independent label NOMA Records, along with his wife, Chief Marketing Officer Xochi Smith as well as David and Lisa Midgett.

== Personal life ==
During the production of Brandy's Full Moon album, Smith became romantically involved with the singer. The couple shared the same exact birthday. The couple began a relationship in mid-2001 but announced it in February 2002, when Brandy revealed that she was expecting a child. A year after the birth of their daughter Sy'rai Iman Smith in 2002, the couple announced their separation on MTV reality series Special Delivery. In 2004, Smith disclosed that the pair never legally wed but portrayed the notion of nuptials to preserve Norwood's public image. Smith and his wife Xochitl Jacques-Smith work together and have five children, Rain, Soleil, Sade, Robert and Judah. The family lives in Ocala, Florida.

== Production work ==
- Michael Jackson - Invincible (2001)
- Brandy - Full Moon (2001)
  - "When You Touch Me" (co-production)
  - "Wow"
- Dave Hollister – Things in the Game Done Changed (2002)
  - "Baby Do Those Things"
  - "I'm Wrong"
  - "It's Okay"
- Jennifer Lopez – Rebirth (2005)
  - "Ryde or Die"
- Jessica Simpson – Irresistible (2001)
  - "Imagination" (co-production)
- Kelly Rowland – Simply Deep (2002)
  - "Love/Hate"
- Kiley Dean – Simple Girl (2002)
  - "Better Than the Day"
  - "Confused"
  - "Should I"
- Nina Sky – Starting Today (2010)
  - "Curtain Call"
- Olivia – Behind Closed Doors (2005)
  - "Never Too Far"
- Ray J – This Ain't a Game (2001)
  - "Crazy" (co-production)
- Spice Girls – Forever (2000)
  - "Get Down with Me" (co-production)
- Tarralyn Ramsey – Tarralyn (2004)
  - "Take Me Away"
- Toni Braxton – More Than a Woman (2002)
  - "Always"
  - "Selfish"
- Trin-i-tee 5:7 – The Kiss (2002)
  - "All My Life"
  - "I Wish"
