= Human World =

Human World may refer to:

- Anthropocene, a proposed geological epoch
- Human World (political party), a minor German political party
- Human World Tour, a solo concert tour by American recording artist, Brandy
