= Right Here (Departed) =

2008 single by Brandy

Single by Brandy

from the album Human
- Released: August 13, 2008
- Recorded: 2008
- Studio: 2nd Floor (Los Angeles, California)
- Length: 3:38
- Label: Epic
- Songwriters: Evan "Kidd" Bogart; Victoria Horn; Rodney Jerkins; Erika Nuri; David "DQ" Quiñones
- Producers: Rodney Jerkins; LaShawn Daniels

Brandy singles chronology
"Afrodisiac" (2004)	"Right Here (Departed)" (2008)	"Long Distance" (2008)

Music video
- "Right Here (Departed)" on YouTube

"Right Here (Departed)" is a song by American recording artist Brandy. It was written by Rodney "Darkchild" Jerkins and The Writing Camp members Evan "Kidd" Bogart, Victoria Horn, Erika Nuri, and David "DQ" Quiñones and produced by Jerkins for her fifth studio album, Human (2008). Not recorded until late into the production of the album, it set much of the tone for the final Human track listing as it was the first out of several new songs Norwood and Jerkins recorded together following his absence on her previous album Afrodisiac (2004). Its lyrics chronicle a woman's talks about mutual support with loved ones.

Picked as the album's leading single and Norwood's first release with Epic Records following her departure from the Atlantic label in 2005, the song premiered on her official webpage on August 13, 2008. Her first release in four years, it was officially serviced to US radio on August 25, 2008, prior to receiving a major release between September 2008 and March 2009 on most international territories. While "Right Here (Departed)" became a moderate hit in the US, where it reached number 34 on the Billboard Hot 100, the track emerged as her highest-charting single in years, reaching the top ten of the French Singles Chart, top twenty on the Japan Hot 100, and the top of Billboard's Hot Dance Club Play chart.

An accompanying music video for "Right Here (Departed)" was directed by Little X and filmed in Los Angeles, California in August 2008. Loosely inspired by the art direction of Francis Lawrence's 2007 science fiction film I Am Legend, it depicts Norwood as an angel, who is crossing over to the intermediate state and coming back into her family and friend's lives, comforting them just with her singing. It reached the top of BET's 106 & Park countdown and was voted number sixty-nine on BET: Notarized Top 100 videos of 2008. Part of the set-lists of Norwood's Human World Tour (2009), the song was performed live on several televised events, including Total Request Live, The Tyra Banks Show and BET's Just Human special (2008).

== Background and recording ==
In June 2004, Norwood's fourth studio album, Afrodisiac, was released on Atlantic Records. While the album became a critical success, it enjoyed mediocre commercial success only: Though it debuted at number three on the Billboard 200, it generally failed to chart or sell noticeably outside the United States. Lead single "Talk About Our Love", featuring rapper Kanye West, reached number six in the United Kingdom but later singles failed to score successfully on the popular music charts. The following year, after eleven years with the company, Norwood asked for and received an unconditional release from Atlantic, citing her wish "to move on" as the main reason for her decision. Completing her contract with the label, a compilation album compiling her first four studio albums with Atlantic, entitled The Best of Brandy, was released in March 2005. Thereupon, she reportedly started shopping for a new record deal under Knockout Entertainment, her brother's vanity label, and began work on her fifth studio album independently with a wider range of songwriters and producers.

"Right Here (Departed)"
Not recorded until late into the album production, "Right Here (Departed") set much of the tone for the final track listing of Human.

Penned by Evan "Kidd" Bogart and his fellow Writing Camp members Victoria Horn, Erika Nuri and David Quiñones, "Right Here (Departed)" was not recorded until late into the production of the Human album. It was the first out of several Rodney Jerkins-crafted demo tracks Human A&R Brandon Creed presented to Norwood and the first song Jerkins and Brandy recorded together at the 2nd Floor Studios in Los Angeles following the pair's musical reunification in early June 2008. It would eventually version as the result convinced Norwood and her team to replace actual main producer Brian Kennedy in favor of Jerkins. While "Right Here (Departed)" was not specifically created for Brandy or the Human album, Bogart called it an "honor" to have the singer record one of their songs. "I think it's definitely a great comeback song for her, stylistically and conceptually," he said. "It's like working a new artist." Her first record as a member of The Writing Team, Erika Nuri, added: "It is truly an honor and a blessing to have her first single, especially knowing that so many other great songwriters and producers were gunning for it and are on the album. I do think it's a perfect comeback song for her. A song for her old fans, but also new enough for kids that have never heard her before to gravitate too."

Norwood noted the song "a Brandy song" and "reconnect" with Jerkins: "Our experience this time has been very magical," she said about collaboration with Jerkins. "Our sound is a little bit different from our old sound, [but] it's like something that we would have done but on another level. Like the new version of who we are [...]." Lyrically, "Departed" chronicle a woman's talks about mutual support with loved ones. Recorded with therapeutical background, Norwood has noted the fatal 2006 car accident, in which she was involved, as a reason for its inclusion on the album. "To know that you have somebody by your side who is gonna always be there for you, that comforts you in a way and that kinda gives you an extra confidence about yourself," she said, "And that's what I love about it: It's first the message and then you get into the beat and the whole musical part of it. I think everyone's gonna be able to relate to that [...] It's universal."

== Release and reception ==
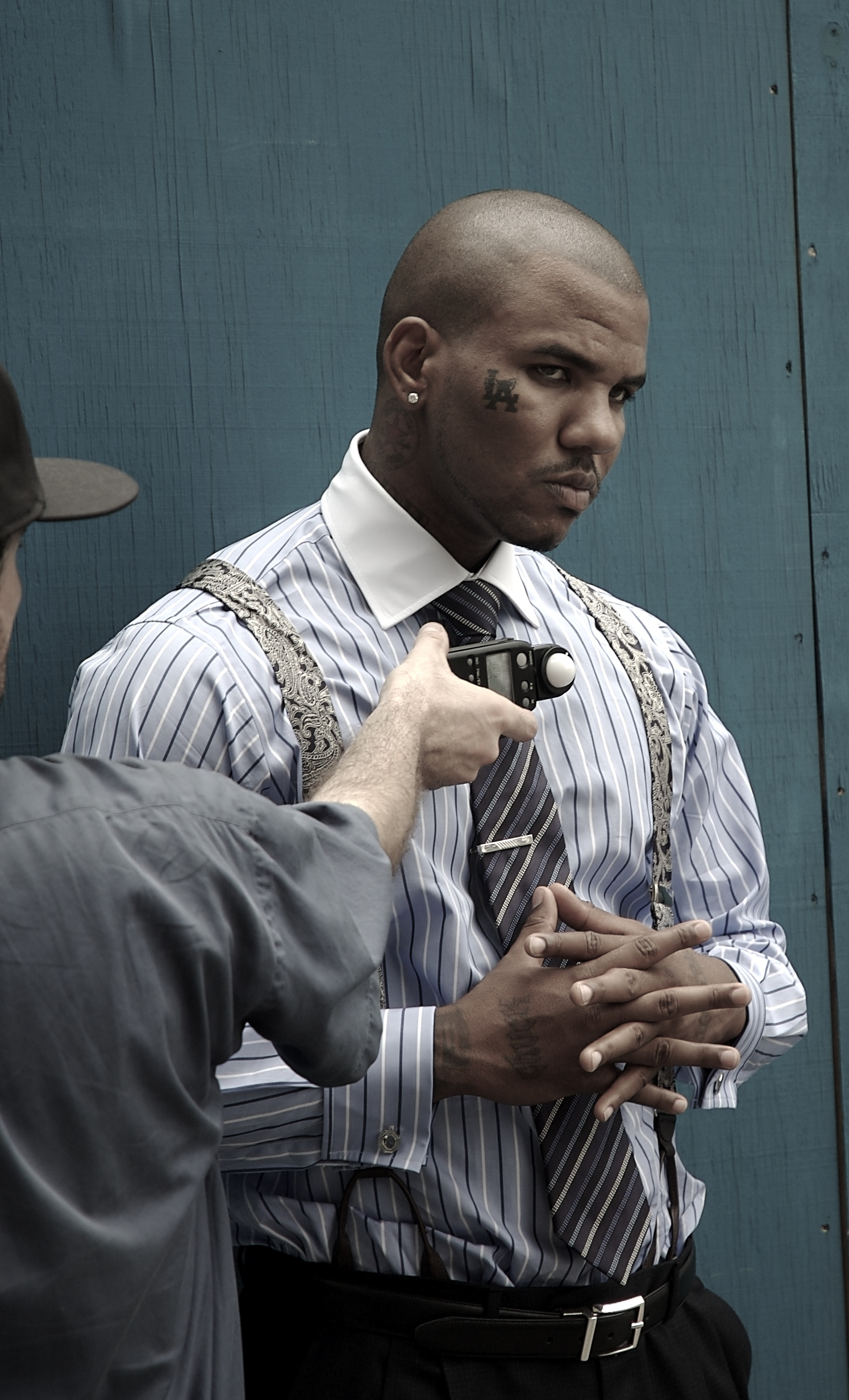
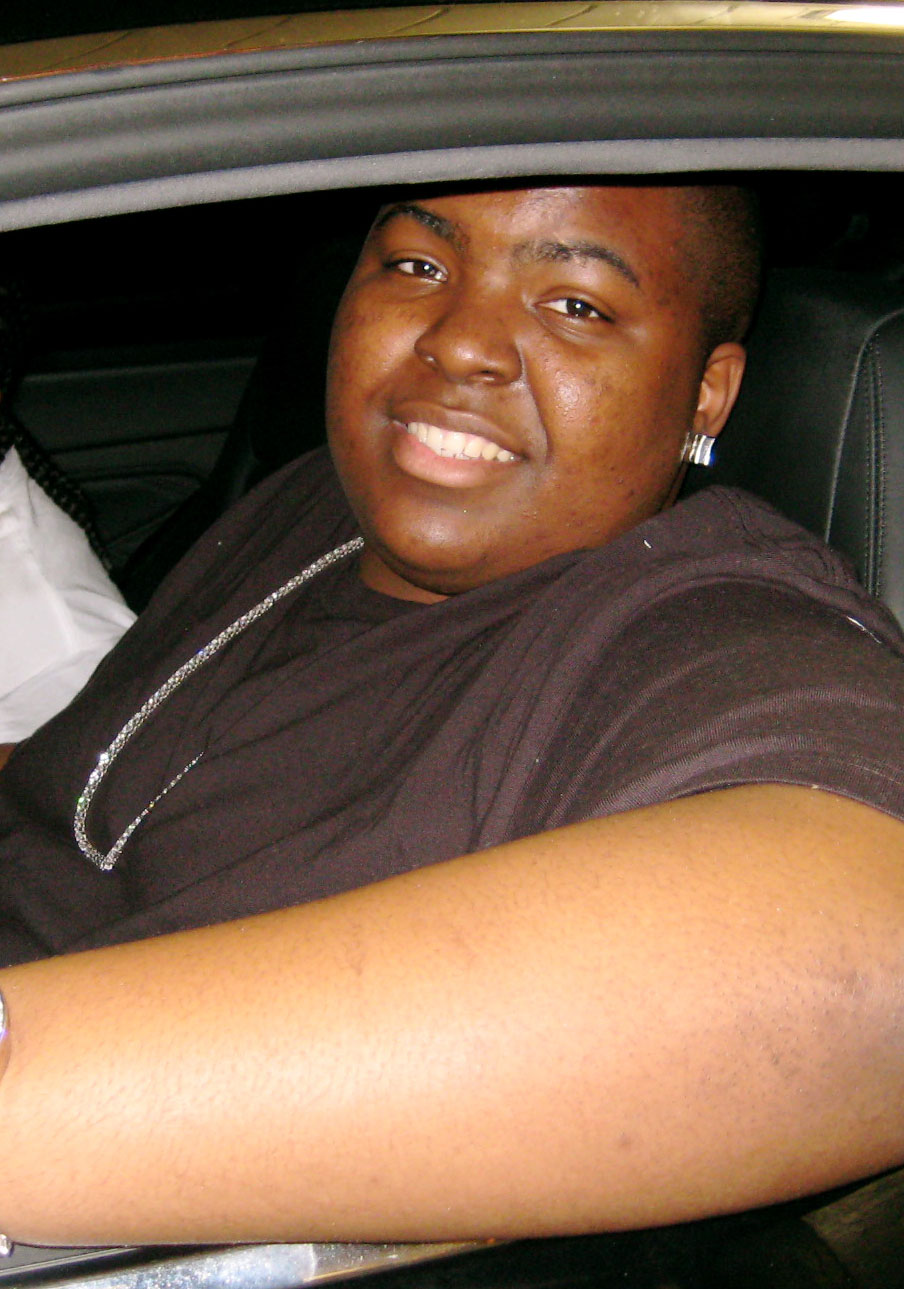
Rappers The Game (left) and Sean Kingston both recorded vocals for remixes of the song.

The song premiered on Norwood's official webpage on August 13, 2008. A remix of "Right Here (Departed)", featuring rapper The Game, was released in November 2008, with another remix featuring former Epic Records label mate Sean Kingston being leaked in December 2008.

Upon its release, the track garnered generally positive reviews by music critics. Alex Macpherson of The Guardian declared "Right Here (Departed)" Human's "finest moment" and wrote that "Norwood turns to face the world, though: 'Right Here (Departed)' is a cosmic, ride-or-die declaration of epic scope." Emmanuel Ezugwu, reviewer for RWD Magazine, called the song a "joyous ode to overcoming insurmountable odds." Los Angeles Times writer Mikael Wood, barely satisfied with Human in general, called "Right Here (Departed)" one of the "few highlights" on the album, stating: "Catchy lead single 'Right Here (Departed)' manages to dial down Brandy's introspection and increase the groove factor."

Shanel Odum from Vibe called the track "a graceful return to her melodic origins" and praised Norwood's "husky but hopeful, but still pain-infused" vocal performance. Newsday reviewer Glenn Gamboa wrote: "With the help of producer Rodney Jerkins, Brandy radiates warmth and hopefulness throughout Human – not in the naive way of someone who doesn't know any better, but in the determined way of someone who does. Her delivery on the up-tempo "Right Here (Departed)" reflects those choices. There's no showing off with vocal acrobatics or flashy production, just a premium on the melody and the mood."

== Chart performance ==
Brandy's first release in four years, "Right Here (Departed)" premiered via Brandy's official webpage on August 13, 2008, and officially serviced to US radio on August 25, 2008. It debuted at number 83 on the US Billboard Hot 100 issue dated September 27, 2008, being the fourth-highest new entry of the week. Although the song fell four spots the following week, it slowly rose week by week and eventually peaked at number 34 on the Hot 100 chart, following the album's release on December 9. On Billboard's genre charts, the single reached the top spot on the Hot Dance Club Play chart (becoming Brandy's first single to do so) and number 22 on both the Hot R&B/Hip-Hop Songs and the Pop 100 charts.

In Canada, "Right Here (Departed)" became Brandy's highest-charting single since 2002's "What About Us?". It debuted at number 95 on the Canadian Hot 100, dropped one week after and made a re-entry a month later on the chart, eventually rising to its peak position of number 39. In Europe, the single reached number twenty-four on the Eurochart Hot 100 Singles chart and moreover made it to the top ten in France, where it became her best-selling effort in ten years, reaching a peak position of number seven based on digital downloads only. It has since remained thirty-seven weeks within the top 100 of the chart. In addition, "Right Here" scored top forty entries in Austria, Belgium, Bulgaria, Denmark, Germany, and Sweden, where it outsold any single release taken from previous album Afrodisiac (2004).

== Music video ==
The music video for "Right Here (Departed)", Norwood's first collaboration with Canadian director Little X, was filmed on August 17, 2008, in Los Angeles, California. The concept of the video was chosen out of several different ideas. Norwood, who cited the "realness" of X's treatment as its strength, described the video about being there for a loved one. The concept depicts Norwood as an angel, who is "crossing over to the other side and coming back into my family's life. Just popping up everywhere, just singing to them," she said, also noting its I Am Legend feel. "You can take it like you're talking about a mother and a daughter, a sister, brother, girlfriend, whatever — it's universal in that way [...] sometimes you see me on the street by myself completely, and it's pretty cool. I'm really excited about it [...]."

Shot on-street and in front of a greenscreen, it features cameo appearances by Jerkins and Norwood's younger brother Ray J, also starring actor Cory Hardrict as a central character. The full production of the clip was tracked by BET's Access Granted television series, with the final cut eventually premiering on small screen on September 3, 2008, at the end of its Access Granted episode and online at 3:00 pm PT on Yahoo! Music. Although the shooting of a scene with Norwood interacting with a young girl was captured by Access Granted, the sequence was not included into the final cut of the video. On October 31, 2008, the video reached number one on BET's 106 & Park countdown. In addition, it was voted number 69 on BET: Notarized Top 100 videos of 2008.

The video begins with the widescreen opening up and with the title name. In the first verse, Norwood appears in front of the sky and on a sidewalk near town when she sings to a man, giving him solace. During the second verse and chorus, a woman is walking out of a factory crying. When Norwood appears to her, the cars standing in the parking lot disappear. During the bridge, Norwood appears on two bridges and a tunnel. At the end of the video, Norwood disappears and the man and woman wake up from their daydream, both looking more comfortable.

== Formats and track listings ==
US promo CD remixes

1. "Right Here (Departed)" (Seamus Haji & Paul Emanuel club mix) – 8:53
2. "Right Here (Departed)" (Moto Blanco club mix) – 6:52
3. "Right Here (Departed)" (Mad decent mad right mix) – 4:36
4. "Right Here (Departed)" (Seamus Haji & Paul Emanuel radio edit) – 4:08
5. "Right Here (Departed)" (Moto Blanco radio edit) – 3:35
6. "Right Here (Departed)" (Seamus Haji & Paul Emanuel dub mix) – 7:09
7. "Right Here (Departed)" (Moto Blanco dub mix) – 7:01

US promo CD

1. "Right Here (Departed)" (main version) – 3:39
2. "Right Here (Departed)" (piano intro version) – 3:41
3. "Right Here (Departed)" (instrumental) – 3:40

French CD single

1. "Right Here (Departed)" (album version)
2. "Right Here (Departed)" (piano intro version)

German basic CD

1. "Right Here (Departed)" (main version) – 3:39
2. "Right Here (Departed)" (remix, featuring Sean Kingston) – 3:41

German premium CD

1. "Right Here (Departed)" (main version)
2. "Gonna Find My Love"
3. "Right Here (Departed)" (Moto Blanco club mix) – 6:52
4. "Right Here (Departed)" (Seamus Haji & Paul Emanuel dub mix) – 7:09
5. "Right Here (Departed)" (music video) – 3:39

== Credits and personnel ==
- Vocals: Brandy Norwood
- Additional backing vocals: Rodney Jerkins
- Vocal production: LaShawn Daniels, & Brandy Norwood
- Recording engineers: Mike Donaldson, & Paul Foley
- Music performed by: Rodney "Darkchild" Jerkins
- Strings arranged and conducted by: Rodney Jerkins
- Mixing: Manny Marroquin, R. Jerkins
  - Mixing assistance: Chris Plata, Erik Madrid
- Mastering: Brian Gardner

== Charts ==
=== Weekly charts ===
Chart (2008–2009)	Peak position
Austria (Ö3 Austria Top 40)	27
Belgium (Ultratip Bubbling Under Flanders)	4
Belgium (Ultratop 50 Wallonia)	32
Canada Hot 100 (Billboard)	39
Canada CHR/Top 40 (Billboard)	29
Canada Hot AC (Billboard)	33
Denmark (Tracklisten)	30
European Hot 100 Singles (Billboard)	24
France (SNEP)	7
Germany (GfK)	39
Germany (German Black Chart)	2
Global Dance Songs (Billboard)	26
Hungary (Rádiós Top 40)	7
Japan (Japan Hot 100)	11
Romania (Romanian Top 100)	63
Sweden (Sverigetopplistan)	22
Switzerland (Schweizer Hitparade)	54
US Billboard Hot 100	34
US Dance Club Songs (Billboard)	1
US Dance Singles Sales (Billboard)	8
US Hot R&B/Hip-Hop Songs (Billboard)	22
US Pop Airplay (Billboard)	21
US Rhythmic Airplay (Billboard)	28

=== Year-end charts ===
Chart (2009)	Position
France (SNEP)	56
Japan Adult Contemporary (Billboard)	74

== Release history ==
Region	Format	Date
United States	Rhythm/crossover radio	August 25, 2008
United States	Urban Contemporary radio	August 25, 2008
United States	Digital download	September 9, 2008
United States	Mainstream radio	September 23, 2008
United States	Urban Adult Contemporary radio	September 23, 2008
Austria	Digital download	September 12, 2008
Germany	Digital download	September 12, 2008
Switzerland	Digital download	September 12, 2008
United Kingdom	Digital download	October 20, 2008
France	CD single; digital download	January 19, 2009
Switzerland	CD single; digital download	January 19, 2009
United States	Remix single	January 27, 2009
Austria	CD single	March 20, 2009
Germany	CD single	March 20, 2009
