= True (Brandy song) =

Song by Brandy

from the album Human
- Released: December 6, 2008
- Recorded: 2008
- Studio: Larrabee Studios (Los Angeles, California)
- Genre: R&B; pop
- Length: 3:47
- Label: Epic
- Songwriters: Nadir Khayat, Claude Kelly
- Producer: RedOne

"True" is a song by American singer Brandy Norwood recorded for her fifth studio album Human (2008). Originally written and composed by RedOne along with Claude Kelly for entertainer Michael Jackson, the song deals with betrayal and heartbreak. A pop-R&B ballad that features instrumentation by the piano and strings, "True" deals with trust issues lyrically. The protagonist sings to an indifferent love interest, wondering whether she is his only one and whether he loves her.

The song garnered generally mixed to positive reviews by contemporary music critics who considered it one of the album's strongest ballads, but felt it was overproduced. Following the release of Human, "True" charted at number 18 on the Bubbling Under R&B/Hip-Hop Singles, a chart composed of 25 positions that represent songs that are making progress to chart on the main R&B/Hip-Hop Singles chart.

== Background and recording ==
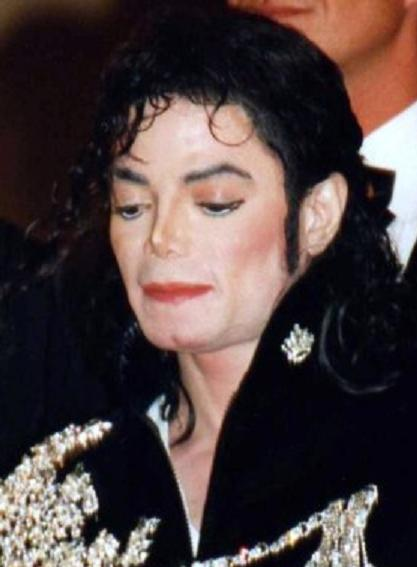
Claude Kelly and RedOne originally penned the song for singer Michael Jackson.

"True" was written by Nadir "RedOne" Khayat and Claude Kelly and conceived amid recording sessions for singer Lady Gaga's debut album The Fame (2008) in New York City in 2007. The pair originally wrote the song from a male perspective with entertainer Michael Jackson in mind. Khayat and Kelly both had been working with Jackson on new songs at that time; the opportunity of handing it over to Jackson and his team upon finishing their demo however, "kind of passed", according to Kelly. The following year, Epic Records A&R manager Brandon Creed heard a demo version performed by Kelly, feeling that it would fit Norwood's Human, her upcoming debut album with the company. Kelly said, "Creed heard the song and was like 'this would be great for Brandy'. So Brandy went in and we changed the key, changed a couple of words so it made sense for her and made it honest to her point of view. Perfect vocals, perfect emotions, she brought that song to life very easily." Kelly declared Norwood's version "one of [his] favorites too."

Norwood's version of "True" was recorded at Larrabee Studios, in Los Angeles, California, in 2008. Production on the track was handled by RedOne, while vocal production was overseen by Norwood, Kelly and RedOne. Adam Messinger and RedOne played the piano, while Mathias Bylund performed the strings. The song was mixed by Manny Marroquin and RedOne with assistance by Chris Plata and Erik Madrid. All background vocals and harmonies were arranged by Norwood and feature additional vocals by Kelly and Swedish singer Kee. Mastering was handled by Brian Gardner. Lyrically, the song deals with a broken love relationship. It finds Norwood as the female protagonist pleading a lover to let her know that her love for him is reciprocated.

== Critical reception ==
Sarah Rodman of The Boston Globe gave the song a positive review and called the song "one of the album's strongest ballads." Elliot Robinson, writing for So So Gay, declared the record "another stunning ballad that appears in the middle of the album." He felt that Norwood's "vocal performance on this track is wonderful, showing off her range particularly well, and also just how absurdly in control of her instrument Brandy is, as she navigates key changes and notes falling all over the scale — a joy from start to finish and a definite album highlight."

In his album review, Ben Hogwood from MusicOMH wrote, that "inevitably there are the more indulgent ballad moments, and "True" is one of these but by and large the edge cultivated in the faster tracks carries through." Sal Cinquemani from Slant Magazine found the song was a "minor onslaught of adult-contemporary schmaltz which prevented Human from "being a sort of Afro Pt. 2." He felt that "the presence of '90s-style ballads" like "True" should "come as no surprise given that the album [was] an obvious attempt at recapturing Brandy's past successes."

== Credits and personnel ==
- Lead vocals: Brandy Norwood
- Background vocals: Brandy Norwood, RedOne, and Kee
- Producer: RedOne
- Vocal production: Brandy Norwood
- Recording engineer: RedOne
- Piano: RedOne and Adam Messinger
- Mixing: Manny Marroquin and RedOne
  - Mixing assistance: Chris Plata and Erik Madrid
- Mastering: Brian Gardner
- Live strings arranged by: RedOne and Mattias Bylund

== Chart performance ==
For the week ending December 12, 2008, "True" debuted at number 18 on the Billboard Bubbling Under R&B/Hip-Hop Singles chart, based on downloads only.

Chart performance for "True"
| Chart (2008) | Peak position |
|---|---|
| US Bubbling Under R&B/Hip-Hop Singles (Billboard) | 18 |
