= Long Distance (Brandy song) =

Single by Brandy

from the album Human
- Released: October 15, 2008
- Recorded: 2008
- Studio: Boom Boom Room, Burbank, California
- Length: 3:53
- Label: Epic
- Songwriters: Jeff Bhasker; Rodney Jerkins; Philip Lawrence; Bruno Mars
- Producers: Jerkins; Mars

Brandy singles chronology
"Right Here (Departed)" (2008)	"Long Distance" (2008)	"Talk to Me" (2010)

Audio sample
- file; help

Audio video
- "Long Distance" on YouTube

"Long Distance" is a song by American recording artist Brandy. It was written by Bruno Mars, Philip Lawrence, Jeff Bhasker, and Rodney "Darkchild" Jerkins, and was co-produced by Jerkins and Mars for her fifth studio album Human (2008) based on a demo by Mars. It appears as the seventh track on the album on which it is interluded by a telephone conversation between two lovers. The lyrics of the piano–led power ballad describe the protagonist's emotional state towards an ongoing long-distance relationship, which leaves her in depression.

The song was the second and final single to precede the Human album in October 2008. It garnered a generally mixed reception from music critics who applauded the song's lyrical content, its vocals and the hymnlike character, while others found the song would sound too clichéd and outdated. Never released outside North America, "Long Distance" peaked at number 38 on the US Hot R&B/Hip-Hop Songs chart and failed to enter the Hot 100 but became her second consecutive single after "Right Here (Departed)" to reach the top spot on the Dance Club Songs chart. An alternate pop remix, which featured a different instruments, was serviced to mainstream radio in February 2009.

The accompanying music video for the single was directed by Chris Robinson and filmed at the Park Plaza Hotel in Los Angeles in November 2008. Depicting Norwood as a singing diva, who remembers moments with her distant lover, the video shifts from black-and-white to color photography during its bridge. Both Mars and Lawrence appear as pianists in a sequence of the clip. In promotion of the single, Norwood performed "Long Distance" on television shows such as Today, The Tyra Banks Show, CBS News, and BET's Just Human special (2008).

== Background ==
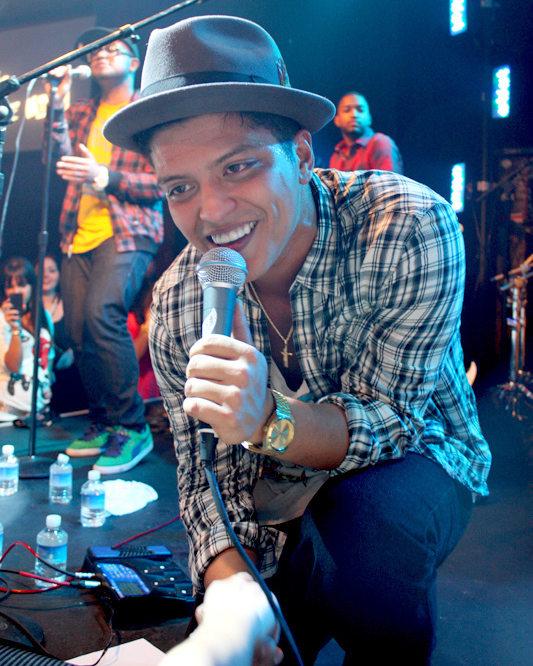
Bruno Mars (pictured) wrote and produced on "Long Distance" along with Phillip Lawrence.

"Long Distance" was written by two-thirds of The Smeezingtons production team, singer Bruno Mars and writer Phillip Lawrence. Penned along with producer Jeff Bhasker, the song was one of the first records Lawrence and Mars team collaborated on. Production on the track was handled by Mars and longtime Brandy contributor Rodney "Darkchild" Jerkins, who expanded the original demo track which was sung by Mars. Eventually scouted by Norwood's A&R manager on Epic Records, Brandon Creed, the track was presented to Norwood, who "fell in love with it" upon hearing and later approved of it. "Long Distance" was recorded at The Boom Boom Room in Burbank, California, with Mars, Lawrence and James Fauntleroy serving as vocal producers.

When asked about her relation to the song, whose lyrics deal with the conditions of long-distance relationships, Norwood elaborated that "Whether it's a significant other or your daughter, a lot of people are away from the people they love. I met some lady, and she was telling me her husband is away in Iraq right now. I was like, 'I have the perfect song for you.' Just being in a long-distance relationship, that experience is weird. You're not able to have that time, and you need that time." She further added: "I was like 'Oh my God so many people can relate to this! This is big!' It was all beautiful and Rodney [Jerkins] came in and did his thing on it."

== Critical reception ==
"Long Distance" was released to positive reception by critics. Hillary Crosley of Billboard gave the song a positive review, stating: "An old radio wives' tale says that a good ballad will carry an artist through the winter months – and up the charts. As such, Brandy follows her comeback single "Departed" with another slow burn about loss. But this time, her lyric details a long-distance relationship and how difficult it is to go on while her beau is away. The piano-driven track is peppered with layered vocals from the songstress. It's refreshing to hear Brandy's voice again and equally heartwarming to see she and Rodney Jerkins reunite creatively." Talia Kraines, writing for BBC Music, described the song as the soundtrack to "a heartbreaking moment on a Grey's Anatomy finale." She found that the "understated ballad is just as good as [Beyoncé's] "If I Were A Boy" and "should be a global hit, beating with surging strings and tenderness."

Jon Pareles, writing for The New York Times described "Long Distance" as "a hymnlike single that distantly echoes Janet Jackson’s "Again." Nick Bond from MTV Australia called the song "the album's safest moment" and sumed it as a "bombastic piano ballad worthy of Whitney Houston." Sarah Rodman of The Boston Globe praised the "warmer, more organic" structure of the song, which she found distinguished from the rest of the Human album, and noted that the song "brings out the expressive best in Brandy's pleasantly raspy vocalizing," while Melody Charles from SoulTracks declared the song "achingly vulnerable." By contrast, Sal Cinquemani from Slant Magazine criticized the song's "attempt at recapturing Brandy's past successes," and further wrote that it "sounds like a cliché power ballad that could have been sung by Phil Collins or Peter Cetera in the '80s as the theme for some big Hollywood popcorn flick."

== Music video ==
=== Background ===
Although an accompanying music video for "Long Distance" was expected to be shot by Norwegian director Ray Kay in the week of October 20, 2008, Norwood eventually reteamed with director Chris Robinson in Los Angeles, California on November 6, 2008 to film the actual clip. Executive produced by Amanda Fox for Robinson's Robot Films, it marked Norwood's second video to be directed by Robinson, who had previously worked with her on 2002's "Full Moon". As Robinson stated in a behind-the-scenes interview with Rap-Up, the concept of the video is basically about performance. He envisioned a cinematic music video for the song, leading him to select the opulent Park Plaza Hotel in Downtown Los Angeles to depict his vision of taking Norwood "through the feeling of missing the person she's in love with." The finished video world premiered on entertainment blog PerezHilton.com on December 1, 2008, where it was described as "Whitney circa the '90s (the Babyface era)." Upon its television debut, it came in at number nine on BET's 106 & Park countdown on December 22, 2008, and peaked at the top position on January 14, 2009 where it held the number-one spot for an entire week.

=== Synopsis ===
Bruno Mars (left) and Philip Lawrence appear as pianists in the "Long Distance" video which was shot at the Park Plaza Hotel.

The video starts off with Norwood sitting at a dresser in her empty dressing room looking in the mirror, putting on a ring, and putting on make-up while she is thinking about her boyfriend. This part of the video is combined with scenes of Norwood spending time with her boyfriend. The second part of the video shows Norwood singing in front of the Park Plaza Hotel restaurant while her boyfriend is over by the bar. She is singing to him that she can't be home but she will be home soon. Then he goes over to her and touches her on the face. Then, the camera zooms out of this part of the video to find that it's something that Norwood is watching in a picture frame in her room, which catches on fire while she is singing the second half of the second chorus of the song. Then from the bridge of the song to the end of the video, it goes into color while Norwood is standing in between a row of red curtains while it's raining. Then at the end of the video, some of scenes reverse (in color). The video ends with Norwood looking into her dresser mirror. Both Bruno Mars and Philip Lawrence appear as pianists in a sequence of the clip.

== Track listings ==
Digital download
No.	Title	Producer(s)	Length
1.	"Long Distance" (album version)	Rodney Jerkins; Bruno Mars	3:46

Digital remix EP
No.	Title	Producer(s)	Length
1.	"Long Distance" (Jody den Broeder Club Remix)	Jerkins; Mars; Jody den Broeder^{[A]}	7:43
2.	"Long Distance" (Tom Neville Close Up Vocal Remix)	Jerkins; Mars; Tom Neville^{[A]}	7:05
3.	"Long Distance" (Jody den Broeder Radio Edit)	Jerkins; Mars; Broeder^{[A]}	4:04
4.	"Long Distance" (Tom Neville Close Up Vocal Radio Edit)	Jerkins; Mars; Neville^{[A]}	4:14
5.	"Long Distance" (Jody den Broeder House Dub Remix)	Jerkins; Mars; Broeder^{[A]}	8:13
6.	"Long Distance" (Tom Neville Close Up Dub Remix)	Jerkins; Mars; Neville^{[A]}	7:21

Notes

- ^{^[A]} denotes additional producer

== Credits and personnel ==
Credits lifted the album's liner notes.

- Lead vocals – Brandy Norwood
- Producer – Rodney "Darkchild" Jerkins
- Vocal producers – Bruno Mars, Philip Lawrence, James Fauntleroy
- Recording – Greg Ogan
- Mixing – Manny Marroquin, Rodney Jerkins
- Mixing assistance – Chris Plata, Erik Madrid
- Mastering – Brian Gardner

== Charts ==
"Long Distance" became Norwood's second song to top Billboard's Dance Club Songs chart during the week of March 21, 2009.

Chart (2008–2009)	Peak position
Global Dance Tracks (Billboard)	17
US Adult R&B Songs (Billboard)	13
US Bubbling Under Hot 100 (Billboard)	24
US Dance Club Songs (Billboard)	1
US Hot R&B/Hip-Hop Songs (Billboard)	38

== Release history ==
List of releases showing region, format, date, format, record label, and reference
Region	Date	Format	Label	Ref.
United States	October 3, 2008	radio premiere	Epic Records	
United States	October 15, 2008	rhythm/crossover radio	Epic Records	
United States	November 11, 2008	digital download	Epic Records	
United States	February 10, 2009	mainstream radio	Epic Records	
United States	February 24, 2009	remix EP	Epic Records	
