= Slayana World Tour =

2016 concert tour by Brandy

- Tour by Brandy
- Promotional poster for the tour
- Start date: June 15, 2016
- End date: June 30, 2016
- Legs: 1
- No. of shows: 5 in Europe; 4 in Oceania; 9 total

Brandy concert chronology
- Human World Tour (2009); Slayana World Tour (2016); The Boy Is Mine Tour (2025)

The Slayana World Tour (sometimes referred to as the Slayana In These Streets Tour) was the third headlining concert tour by American singer Brandy. The tour was announced on February 23, 2016, and started on June 15, 2016 in Auckland, New Zealand, visiting Europe and Oceania, while performing in twelve cities in June and July. The tour's title is in reference to Norwood's fan nickname — itself a pun on the word "slay" and her middle name Rayana — as well as her own label Slayana Records, which she launched and released her first single "Beggin & Pleadin" on in 2016.

== Background ==
In early 2016, Brandy released "Beggin & Pleadin" for free on the music streaming service SoundCloud, with an accompanying music video on her official YouTube. Soon after, the tour was announced via Musicalize and Norwood's website. Four shows were announced in the United Kingdom, and on April 25, four more shows were added in New Zealand and Australia. An additional four shows were announced for Germany later on. Rehearsals took place in Los Angeles, California, under the direction of Frank Gatson The July 1, 2, and 3 tour dates were postponed due to Norwood's hospitalization.

== Set list ==
This set list is from the concert in London, UK on June 28, 2016.

1. "Afrodisiac"
2. "I Thought"
3. "What About Us?"
4. "Full Moon"
5. "Who Is She 2 U"
6. "Top Of The World"
7. "Sittin Up In My Room"
8. "Baby"
9. "Best Friend"
10. "I Wanna Be Down"
11. "The Boy Is Mine"
12. "Angel In Disguise"
13. "Without You"
14. "Have You Ever"
15. "Necessary"
16. "Almost Doesn't Count"
17. "Magic/ Human Nature
18. "I'm Your Baby Tonight/ How Will I Know/ I Wanna Dance With Somebody (Who Loves Me)/ Exhale (Shoop Shoop)
19. "Wildest Dreams"
20. "Put It Down"
21. "Beggin' & Pleadin"

== Shows ==
List of concerts, showing date, city, country, and venue
Date	City	Country	Venue
Oceania
June 15, 2016	Auckland	New Zealand	The Civic
June 17, 2016	Perth	Australia	Metro City Concert Club
June 20, 2016	Sydney	Australia	Enmore Theatre
June 21, 2016	Melbourne	Australia	Hamer Hall
Europe
June 24, 2016	Manchester	United Kingdom	O2 Apollo Manchester
June 25, 2016	Birmingham	United Kingdom	O2 Academy Birmingham
June 27, 2016	Bristol	United Kingdom	O2 Academy Bristol
June 28, 2016	London	United Kingdom	indigo at The O2
June 30, 2016	Stuttgart	Germany	LKA-Longhorn

== Cancelled shows ==
List of cancelled concerts, showing date, city, country,
Date	City	Country	Venue	Reason
July 1, 2016	Cologne	Germany	Live Music Hall	Hospitalization
July 2, 2016	Hamburg	Germany	Große Freiheit 36	Hospitalization
July 3, 2016	Berlin	Germany	Huxley's Neue Welt	Hospitalization
