= Victoria Horn =

English Grammy Award winning songwriter

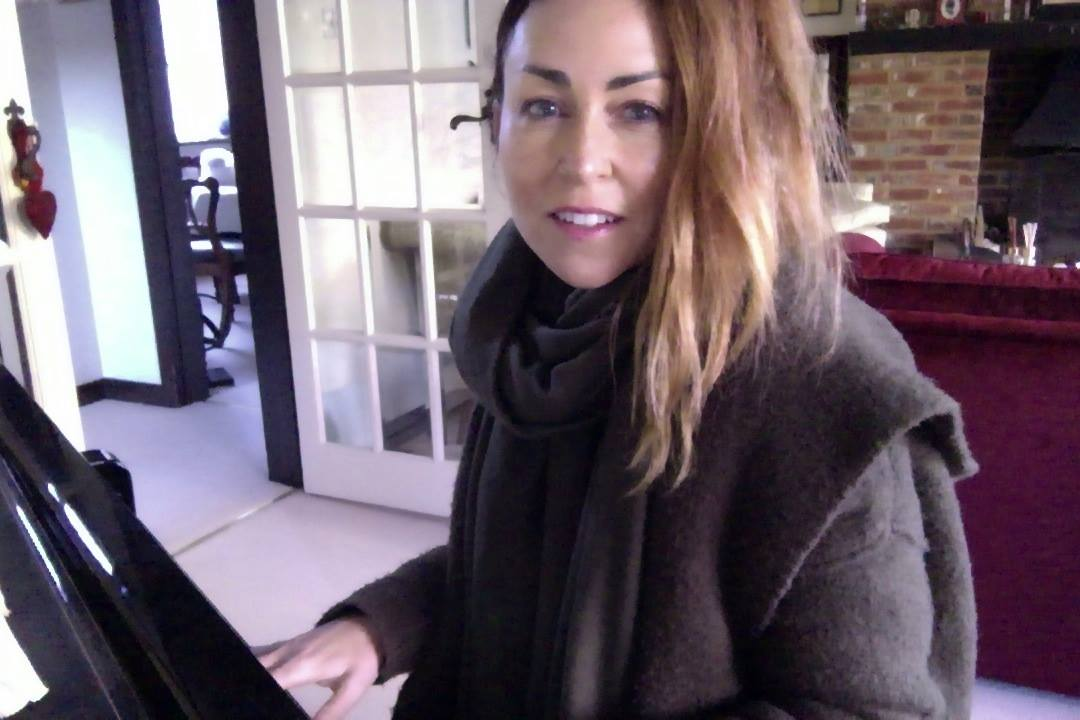

Background information
- Born: Kent, England
- Genres: Pop, Urban, dance, Electronica, Rock, Classical
- Occupations: Songwriter (lyric and melody)

Victoria Jane Horn (also known as Lady V) is an English Grammy Award-winning songwriter and ASCAP and BMI heavy rotation award winner.

== Personal life ==
Victoria Horn began studying the piano when she was three years old and later learned the guitar. At an early age, she showed promise in the areas of both fashion design and music (winning a young designer award at the age of 16.) She was also an accomplished show jumper, with a long familial tradition in the sport. She is often referred to by her writer/feature artist name "Lady V". After signing her first publishing deal to Chrysalis Music, V spent four years honing her lyric and melody craft in Nashville. She went on to live for 12 years in West Hollywood, where she was part of The Writing Camp songwriting team. She recently purchased a Grade 2 listed Vicarage in Kent and has opened a public Rose Garden and editorial space. The house has also been chosen by Edward Bulmer paints as an editorial house.

== Musical career ==
By the age of 17, Lady V was an accomplished session singer. Her first major songwriting release, a song from 2001 called "Days Go By" performed by Dirty Vegas, peaked at No. 14 on the U.S. Billboard Hot 100 and No. 1 on the U.S. Billboard Hot Dance Play following its implementation in an advertisement for the Mitsubishi Eclipse. "Days Go By" continued to garner heavy radio play throughout 2002 and win a Grammy Award for Best Dance Recording as well as an ASCAP Pop Music Award for its author.

"Who Do You Love Now?" was written in 2001 by Victoria Horn, performed by Dannii Minogue and produced by Riva. The single reached number 3 in the United Kingdom and remaining on the charts for 15 weeks, Minogue's longest stay on the UK Singles Chart for any of her singles. The song marked a turning point for Minogue.

In 2003, a song she cowrote for Enrique Iglesias (featuring Kelis) entitled "Not in Love" won the Billboard Latin Dance song of the year and enjoyed top-10 placement in many sales charts around the world.

In 2008, Lady V co-wrote the song "This is Us", which appeared on the Keyshia Cole album A Different Me. The album went on to sell one million copies. As well, during this year, Lady V collaborated with songwriters David "DQ" Quiñones, Erika Nuri, Rodney Jerkins, and Evan Bogart to found The Writing Camp. The Writing Camp wrote Brandy's debut single "Right Here (Departed)" off her 2008 album Human. The song was picked as the album's leading single and Brandy's first release with Epic Records, following her split with Atlantic Records in 2005. Fellow co-writer Rodney Jerkins said about Lady V: "I've had the pleasure of writing with Victoria Horn on a lot of great music. Her great sense of melody and new fresh approach to concepts and lyrics is what I love about her writing. She is definitely one of my new favorite songwriters to work with."

In 2009, Demi Lovato's Here We Go Again album, on which Lady V wrote the song "Got Dynamite," released straight to no. 1 on the Billboard chart.

In late 2012, Lady V began working more in the genre of electronic dance music. Her vocals are featured on many DJ records and she has begun writing for artists including David Guetta, Markus Schulz, Armin van Buuren, Above and Beyond, and Chicane.

Aside from EDM and her artist writes, Lady V spent four yrs focusing on the k pop market, which after scoring a le serrafim song lead to her taking that experience and applying it to a sync project she currently has with the hit production team Billen Ted and Joe Killington called Mocha Joes. Additionally, she is working on another three sync albums, one with producer Martin Virgo (Bjork, Mono & Massive Attack) called Victoria Darklove, where the pair blend Ennio Morricone-style production with rap and rockabilly. Another project is with trombonist and music producer/arranger Callum Au (Hans Zimmer, Demon Hunters & Raye). The songs are big-band style but with a modern lyrical twist. She also works with Rhys Fulber – delerium, with whom she shares a cinematic electronic project.

== K-pop ==
Recently Lady V teamed up with EKKO Music Rights and co-wrote "Sour Grapes" by South Korean girl group Le Sserafim

== Music Industry ==
Board Member at PRS for Music 'Dance Executive Committee'.

Board Member at The F List for Music The Directory of UK Female+ Musicians. Helping Female & Gender Diverse Musicians Start & Sustain Careers.

Lady V is also active within the songwriting community. She runs a private professional songwriters and producers rights group called the Songwriter Awareness Collective, that represents 800 musicians and works closely with BASCA, PRS and ASCAP. She maintains a Facebook group that provides songwriters with a forum to discuss issues relevant to their field.

== Discography ==
Victoria Horn is credited as a writer or co-writer of the following songs.

- Dirty Vegas – "Days Go By" (single) (Grammy Award and ASCAP Heavy Rotation Award winner)
- Armin Van Buuren – "Wait for You (Song for the Ocean)", "Walk Through the Fire (Sunburn)"
- Armin Van Buuren feat. Lauren Evans – "Alone"
- Markus Schulz – "Winter Kills Me" (feat. Lady V)
- Above and Beyond – "Counting Down the Days", “When You Believe”
- Brandy – "Right Here (Departed)" (single)
- Keyshia Cole – "This is Us"
- Enrique Iglesias feat. Kelis – "Not in Love" (single) (Billboard Latin Dance Award)
- Demi Lovato – "Got Dynamite"
- Selena Gomez / Katy Perry – "Rock God"
- Markus Schulz – "Erase You" (feat. Lady V)
- Darin – "That Love"
- David Archuleta – "Look Around," "Day After Tomorrow", "Everything and More", "Heart Falls Out", "You Worry", "Need", "Brave", "Good in the Bad", "Future Self", "Postcards in the Sky", "Waiting in the Stars", "Therapy"
- Riva Feat Dannii Minogue – "Who Do You Love Now" (single) (Cool Cuts, Buzz Chart, Dance No. 1 and UK Singles Chart No. 3)
- Ryandan – "Bring Me Back" (upcoming), "Silence Speaks" (upcoming), "Already Gone" (upcoming), "Blameless" (upcoming)
- Rui Da Silva feat. Victoria Horn – "Feel the Love" (single) (Cool Cut No. 1)
- Kinobe feat. Victoria Horn – "Butterfly" (single)
- Kate Ryan – "Alive" (single), "I Surrender" (single)
- The Factory feat Pete Tong – "I Couldn't Love You More" (single) (Cool Cut No. 1)
- Kelly Sweet – "We Are One," "Ready for Love," "Eternity," "How 'bout You,"
- Harry Romero – "Love is Your Drug"
- Tata Young – "Lonely in Space"
- DT8 – "Breathe"
- DT8 feat. Andrea Britton – "Winter" (single) (Cool Cut and Buzz Chart No. 1)
- Feela – "Sweet Temptation" (single) (Cool Cut and Buzz Chart No. 1)
- Double 99 feat. Victoria Horn – "Shiver"
- Edurne – "No Quiero Mas"
- Three Graces- "Dile"
- Ben's Brother – "She is Love"
- Peroxide – "The Secret"
- Janet Leon – "Keep It on the Low," Lladeladeda"
- Floorje – "Blindspot"
- Boo Hewerdine "Dream Baby," "Stowaway"
- Anke – "All I'll Ever Need"
- The Soap Girls – "Sour"
- Elva Hsiao – "Sync Breathing"
- Fawni – "Ready When You Are
- Cara Q – "Away from You"
- Wynter Gordon – "Putting It Out There (Pride)"
- The Freemasons – After You're Gone
- The Freemasons feat. Wynter Gordon – "Believer" (Cool Cut No. 1)
- Jessica Jarrell feat Mann – "Ladder"
- Doman and Gooding – "Hooked on You"
- Girls' Generation – "XYZ"
- Joe Cocker – "I'll Be Your Doctor"
- Peter Andre – "Don't Give Up"
- Cymphonique – "Hey Now"
- Cody Simpson and Madison – "Valentine"
- Antillas – "I Belong to No One" (feat. Victoria Horn)
- DJ Sammy – "Shut Up and Kiss Me"
- Conjure One – "Then There Was None" (feat. Christian Burns)
- Conjure One – "I'll Be Your Gold" (feat. Victoria Horn)
- Sky Ferreira – "Ditch That Bitch"
- Joachim/David Guetta – "Final Call"
- Nikki Williams – "Loser"
- Jessica Sanchez – "Crazy Glue" (American Idol)
- Elise Mcgrow – "Ok Cupid"
- Moguai – "Sleep When I'm Dead"
- Shawn Hook – "Million Ways"
- George Perris – "Falling into Beautiful"
- Chicane – "Photograph" (feat. Christian Burns)
- Tiesto vs Two Loud – "We Are the Ones" (feat. Christian Burns)
- Dennis Sheperd & Luick – Glass House
