= List of Six Flags Fiesta Texas attractions =

Six Flags Fiesta Texas consists of six themed areas and an adjacent water park, Six Flags Hurricane Harbor San Antonio.

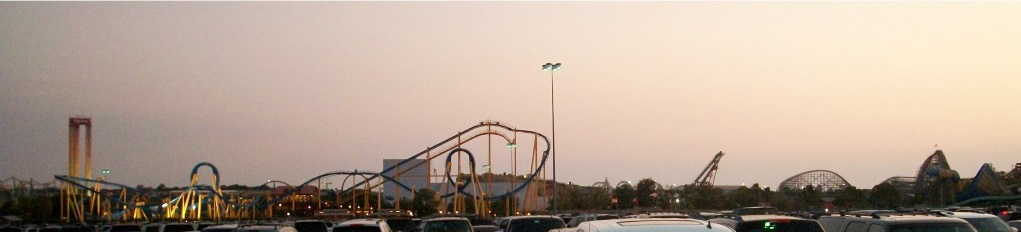
Six Flags Fiesta Texas 2011 Skyline

== Los Festivales ==
Los Festivales is lined with shops selling Six Flags and Fiesta Texas merchandise and food and is the themed land when guests first enter the park.

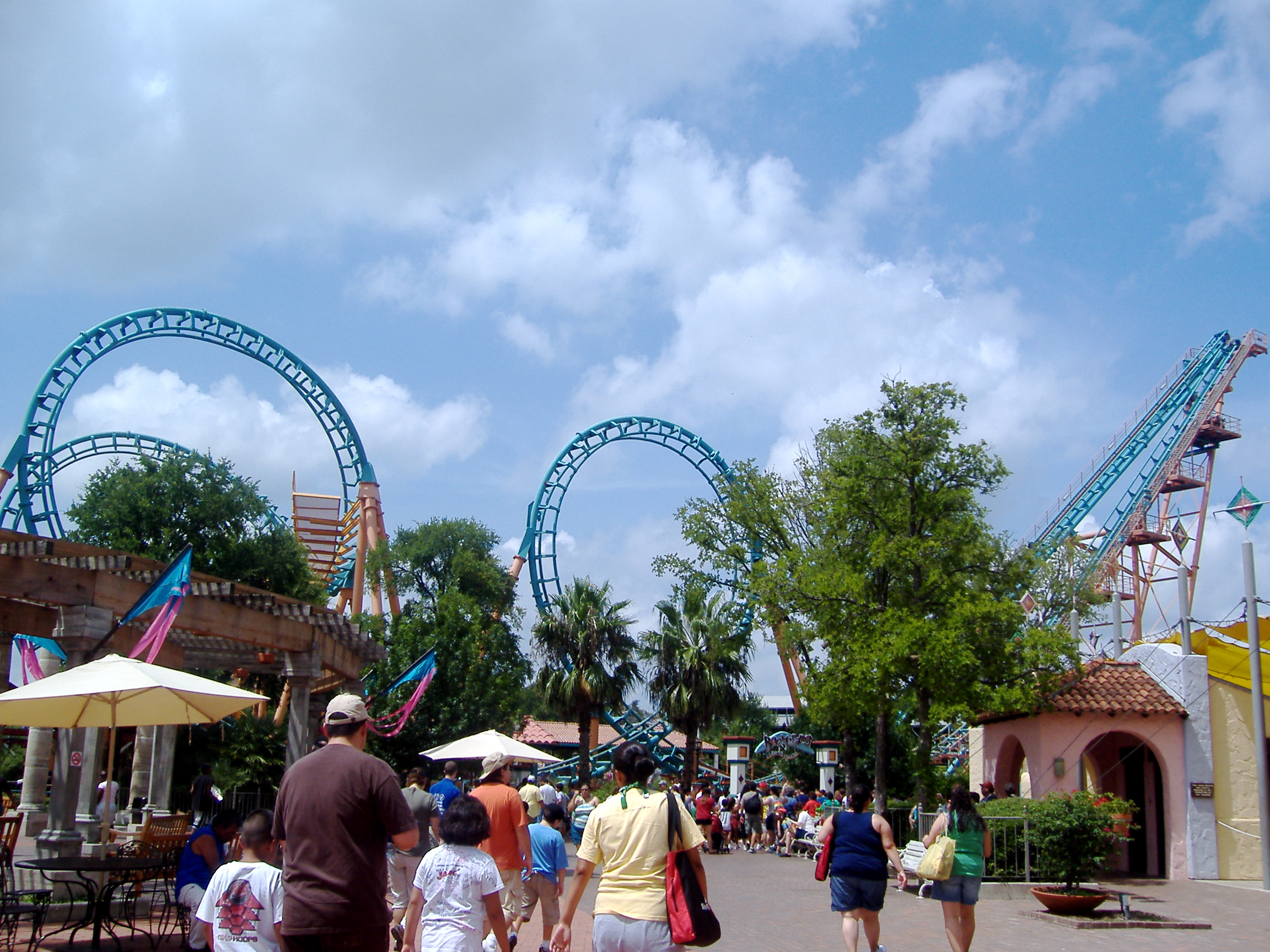
Boomerang: Coast to Coaster at the end of Los Festivales.

Ride	Manufacturer	Year opened	Description
Boomerang: Coast to Coaster	Vekoma	1999	A Vekoma Boomerang that take riders forward and backwards through three inversions.
Chupacabra	Bolliger & Mabillard	2008	A 105 feet (32 m) tall inverted roller coaster that dominates the park entrance and parking lot.

- Zaragoza Theatre, a 1992 indoor theater.
- Teatro Fiesta, a 1992 outdoor venue.

== Crackaxle Canyon Steampunk District ==
Crackaxle Canyon is themed to a 1920s boomtown which features several themed rides and shops.

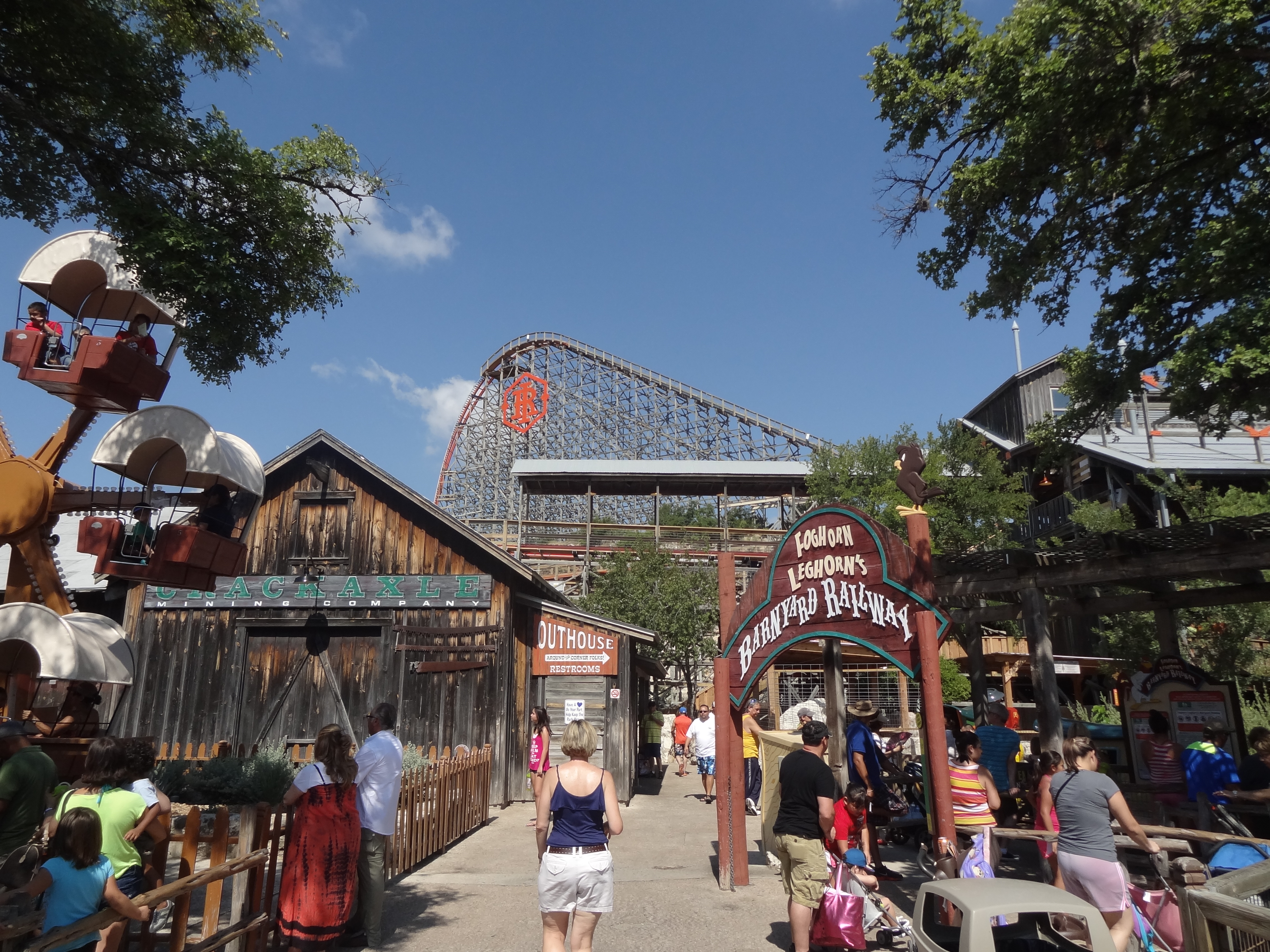
Iron Rattler

Ride	Manufacturer	Year opened	Description
Bucking Broncos	S&S - Sansei Technologies	1999	A Kiddie Drop Ride. Originally located in Crackaxle Canyon until 2008 as Rodeo Rider (1999 to 2001) and Lil' Bronco Buster (2002 to 2008). Moved to current location in 2009 and was called Wiggly Trail Ride until 2011. In April 2023, Buckarooz became Bucking Broncos and in September 2023, it would make its way back to Crackaxle Canyon. During this move, the ride would see more paint upgrades and the reinstallation of its original horse topper.
Dare Devil Dive Flying Machines	Zamperla	March 6, 2021	A Super Air Race ride
Dr. Diabolical's Cliffhanger	Bolliger & Mabillard	2022	A B&M Dive coaster with a drop of 95 degrees, the steepest in the world when it opened.
Foghorn Leghorn's Barnyard Railway	Zamperla	1999	A Rio Grande Kiddie Train Ride.
Iron Rattler	Rocky Mountain Construction	2013	The tallest roller coaster in the park at 179 feet (55 m) tall. Originally opened as Rattler from 1992 to 2012.
Road Runner Express	Arrow Dynamics	1997	A 73 feet (22 m) tall mine train roller coaster themed to the Wile E. Coyote and the Road Runner of the Looney Tunes.
The Gully Washer	Intamin	1992	A river rapids ride.
Yosemite Sam's Wacky Wagons	Zamperla	1999	A Kiddie Ferris Wheel.

- Lone Star Lil's Amphitheater, a 1992 outdoor Amphitheater features events and concerts.
- Whistle Stop 39, a station for the 1992 train ride that takes around the park, Fiesta Texas Railroad.

== DC Universe ==
DC Universe was created in 2019 with the addition of Joker Carnival of Chaos. The new land was a part of Spassburg from 1992 to 2018. DC Universe was announced to be expanded in 2024/2025 into more of Spassburg and the existing kids-themed area, Thrill Seeker Park, with three new rides.

Ride	Manufacturer	Year opened	Description
Batgirl Coaster Chase	Vekoma	1992	A Junior Coaster. Opened as Pied Piper until 1998 and from 1999 to 2008 the roller coaster was renamed to Rollschuhcoaster. Being located in the newly Wiggles World the Vekoma coaster was renamed in 2009 to Romp Bomp A Stomp until 2011. The ride was then called Kiddie Koaster from 2011 to 2019. From 2020 to 2023, it was known as Streamliner Coaster.
Cyborg Cyber Revolution	Zamperla	2025	A NebulaZ.
DC Super-Villains Swing	Zierer	1992	A Wave Swinger. Known as Die Fledermaus from 1992 to 2008 and Whirligig from 2009 to 2018.
Green Lantern Emerald Flight	Zamperla	2009	An Aero Top Jet. Known as The Big Red Planes from 2009 to 2010. The ride was then called ZoomJets from 2011 to 2019 and Stunt Pilots from 2020 to 2023.
Joker Carnival of Chaos	Zamperla	2019	A Giga Discovery.
Metropolis Transit Authority	Zamperla	2025	An Ariel ride. Themed to the DC Comics fictional town, Metropolis. A monorail style ride around the new expanded themed area.
Poison Ivy Toxic Spin	Zamperla	2009	A Samba Tower. Known as Yummy Yummy Fruit Salad from 2009 to 2010. The ride was renamed to Up, Up & Away from 2011 to 2023.
Shazam! Tower of Eternity	Zamperla	2025	A Sky Tower.
Supergirl Sky Flight	Funtime	2012	A 200 feet (61 m) tall StarFlyer. The ride was known as SkyScreamer from 2012 to 2023.
Superman: Krypton Coaster	Bolliger & Mabillard	2000	A168 feet (51 m) tall Floorless Coaster themed to the DC Comics superhero Superman.
The Penguin: Gotham City Getaway	Zamperla	1992	A Convoy Ride. Known as Kinderbahn from 1992 to 2008 and The Big Red Cars from 2009 to 2010. The ride was then called Krazy Kars from 2011 to 2019 and Rambling Road from 2020 to 2023.

== Spassburg ==
Spassburg is themed to a German village after the large number of German towns in Texas.

Ride	Manufacturer	Year opened	Description
Bugs' White Water Rapids	Hopkins	1998	A Super Flume Water Ride. Themed after the cartoon, Knighty Knight Bugs.
Grand Carousel	Morgan	1992	A Carousel, from 1992 to 2008, the carousel was located in Spassburg as Dornroschen. The carousel was relocated to Rockville as Amerigoround until the end of the 2017 season; it has been relocated again back to Spassburg, with a new name.
Kinderstein	Zamperla	1999	A Mini Tea Cups. Known as Mini Tea Cups from 1999 to 2002.

- Der Pilger Bahnhof, a station for the 1992 train ride that takes around the park, Fiesta Texas Railroad.
- Sangerfest Halle, a 1992 indoor theatre and food court.

== Rockville ==
Rockville is themed to a fictional town in 1950s.

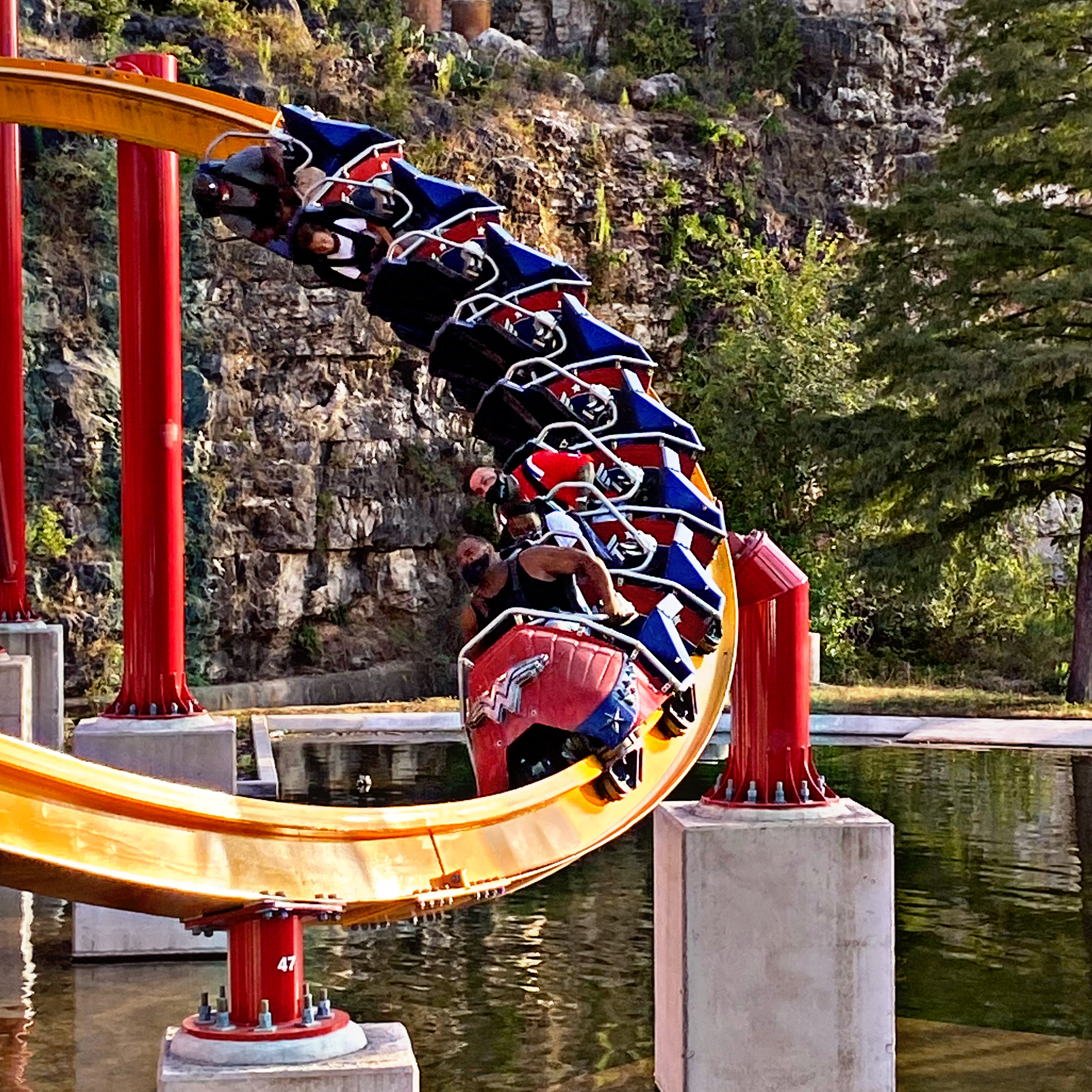

Ride	Manufacturer	Year opened	Description
Batman: The Ride	S&S Worldwide	2015	A 120 feet (37 m) tall 4D Free Spin themed to the DC Comics superhero Batman. First of its kind in the world.
Daffy's School Bus Express	Zamperla	1999	A Crazy Bus ride.
Poltergeist	Premier Rides	1999	A 78 feet (24 m) tall LIM Catapult Coaster.
Scream	S&S Worldwide	1999	A 200 feet (61 m) tall 3-tower Combo Complex.
Taz's Tornado	Zamperla	1999	A Lolly Swing.
The Hustler	Morgan	1992	A Spinning Ride.
Wonder Woman Golden Lasso Coaster	Rocky Mountain Construction	2018	A Raptor Coaster.

- Rockville High, a 1992 indoor theatre themed to a high school. For Fright Fest, the theatre is used as a haunted maze called RockKill High School.

== Fiesta Bay Boardwalk ==
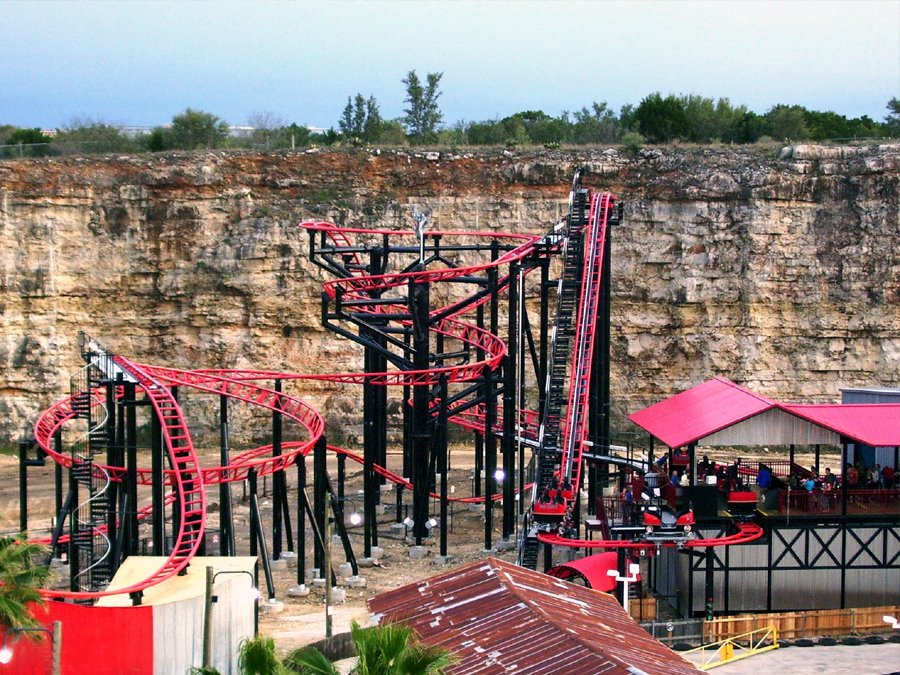

Ride	Manufacturer	Year opened	Description
Circuit Breaker Grand Prix	Amusement Products LLC	2023	Replaced Thunder Beach Speedway with new Electric Go Karts "Extra Charge" attraction
Crow's Nest Ferris Wheel	Chance Rides	1994	A Century Wheel.
Fireball	Larson	2016	A Super Loop.
Hurricane Force 5	Zamperla	2016	A Mega Disk'O.
Pandemonium	Gerstlauer	2007	A 48 feet (15 m) tall spinning roller coaster. Was Tony Hawk's Big Spin from 2007 to 2011.
Pirates of the Deep Sea	Sally Corporation	2019	A interactive family dark ride. The ride replaced the former Scooby-Doo! Ghostblasters: The Mystery of the Haunted Mansion attraction.
Spinsanity	Larson	2016	A Tilt-A-Whirl.
Waverunner	Eli Bridge	1994	A Scrambler ride.

== Future attractions ==
Ride	Manufacturer	Year opened	Description
Werewolf Gorge	Vekoma	2027	A family launch coaster. Longest family launch coaster in the world.

== Former attractions ==
=== Roller coasters ===
Name	Opened	Removed in	Manufacturer	Type	Former Location	Notes
Boardwalk Canyon Blaster	—N/a	—N/a	Zierer	Steel-Family	Fiesta Bay Boardwalk	Boardwalk Canyon Blaster was on the 2000 park map and was supposed to be built behind Frisbee, but was never built in the park due to Fiesta Texas exceeding its yearly budget. It sat in storage in the employee parking lot behind Poltergeist for the rest of the 2000 season and was never set up. In 2001, the ride was relocated to the then under construction Warner Bros. Movie World Madrid (later renamed to Warner Bros Park Madrid in 2004 and later to Parque Warner Madrid in 2006), where it was assembled and opened as Tom & Jerry when the park opened on April 6, 2002.
Kid Flash Cosmic Coaster	2023	2024	Skyline Attractions	Family-Steel	DC Universe	A steel dual-tracked roller coaster based on the DC Comics character Kid Flash. It was placed where Fender Bender was.
Joker's Revenge	1996	2001	Vekoma	Steel	Fiesta Bay Boardwalk	Closed after the 2001 season and was left standing but not operating (SBNO) during the 2002 season. Used to be located where Pandemonium is currently. Was the very first Vekoma Hurricane to be produced in the U.S.. Relocated to Six Flags New Orleans in 2003 and renamed The Jester, was abandoned after Hurricane Katrina damaged the park in 2005 until 2024 when it was demolished and sold for scrap.
The Rattler	1992	2012	Roller Coaster Corporation of America	Wooden	Crackaxle Canyon	The Rattler was one of Six Flags Fiesta Texas' original attractions, opening in 1992. It closed in 2012 and was then converted into Iron Rattler, a Rocky Mountain Construction steel roller coaster which used some of the same support structure.

=== Other attractions and rides ===
Name	Opened	Removed in	Type	Former Location	Notes
Rennsporplatz	1992	1997	Mason Corporation kiddie roller racers/scooters	Spassburg	
Cap’n Willie's Shrimpboat	1994	1998	kiddie soft play ship	Fiesta Bay Boardwalk	
Bayside Paddle Boats	1994	1998	Paddle Boat Ride	Fiesta Bay Boardwalk	(extra charge) Used to be where Hurricane Force 5 is now.
Seaside Golf	1994	1998	Mini Golf	Rockville	Used to be where Poltergeist is now.
The Loop Theatre	1992	1998	Show venue	Rockville	Partially removed for Scream; Seating and stage demolished, backstage extensively remodeled.
Daffy's Duckaneer	1999	2000	Sartori kiddie swinging ship	Crackaxle Canyon	
Screamin’ Skycoaster	1995	2001	Skycoaster	Fiesta Bay Boardwalk	Extra charge
Chaos	1999	2005	Chance Chaos	Rockville	Used to be located where Woman Woman exit gift shop is currently.
Turbo Bungy	2001	2005	Eurobungy bungee/trampoline	Crackaxle Canyon	(Extra charge) Used to be located where Whirlpool and Big Bender is currently.
Tempest	2002	2006	Gravity Works Skyscraper	Fiesta Bay Boardwalk	(extra charge) Used to be located where behind Hurricane Force 5 and Go Karts is currently. Removed to make room for Pandemonium.
The Wipeout	1994	2006	Chance Wipeout	Fiesta Bay Boardwalk	Closed in 2003 and removed in 2006. Used to be located where Spinsanity is currently.
Der Fliegenzirkus	1992	2008	kiddie biplane ride	Spassburg	Removed for Wiggles World.
Kinderwagen	1992	2008	kiddie bumper cars	Spassburg	Removed for Wiggles World; used to be located where the Buckarooz is currently.
Spassburg Children's Theatre	1992	2008	Show venue	Spassburg	Removed for Wiggles World; Was formerly located where 'Up, Up & Away' is currently.
Frosty's Snow Chutes	2008	2010	Snow Hill	Fiesta Bay Boardwalk	Opened only during Holiday in the Park. Used to be located behind the Hurricane Force 5 attraction currently is.
Wagon Wheel	1996	2011	Schwarzkopf Enterprise	Crackaxle Canyon	Relocated from Six Flags Over Texas. Used to be located where Dare Devil: Flying Machines currently is.
S.S. Overboard	1994	2015	Chance Rides Pharaoh's Fury	Fiesta Bay Boardwalk	Closed after the 2012 season and removed in 2015. Fireball took its place in 2016. Removed to make way for Spinsanity.
Motorama	1992	2015	Morgan Electric Cars Ride with 50s style cars	Rockville	Named Motorama Turnpike from 1992 to 2004. Was themed in Rockville to be a large street filled with vehicles that station in a downtown garage. Removed to make way for Batman: The Ride. Was the main attraction in partner with The Rattler. Motorama had over millions of riders until 2015. Was SBNO (Standing but not operating) for the rest of the fall of 2014, and Motorama spot on the map was missing until the 2015 map was produced. The ride had over a variety of 30 different cars, all themed to Cadillacs, Chevy, and Ford cars.
Little Castaways	1994	2015	Mermaid-Themed Ride Works Tea Cups	Fiesta Bay Boardwalk	Closed during the 2013 season and left SBNO until 2015.
Frisbee	1998	2015	Huss Frisbee	Fiesta Bay Boardwalk	Originally located on current Boomerang site in Los Festivales; relocated to where Bayside Paddle Boats was located. Frisbee closed on November 1, 2015, to make away for Hurricane Force 5. Frisbee was a discontinued model, which Huss does not produce anymore, due to their newer version, Giant Frisbee.
Power Surge	1992	2017	Intamin shoot-the-chutes	Rockville	Removed to make way for Wonder Woman Golden Lasso Coaster.
Scooby-Doo! Ghostblasters: The Mystery of the Haunted Mansion	2002	2018	Sally Corporation Interactive Family Dark Ride	Fiesta Bay Boardwalk	Located where Pirates of the Deep Seas is currently.
The Twister	1998	2018	Huss Top Spin	Spassburg	Known as Der Twister from 1998 to 2008. Was removed to make way for The Joker's Carnival of Chaos in 2019.
Sundance Theatre	1992	2021		Crackaxle Canyon	An outdoor theatre. Was removed to make way for Dr. Diabolical's Cliffhanger.
Fender Bender	1992	2022	A Bumper Car ride	Spassburg	Known as Steingasse from 1992 to 2008. Removed to make way for Kid Flash Cosmic Coaster.
Thunder Beach Speedway	1999	2022	J&J Amusements	Fiesta Bay Boardwalk	A Go Kart track. Extra Charge
Slingshot	2013	2023	Funtime	Fiesta Bay Boardwalk	A 181 feet (55 m) tall Slingshot. From 2013 to 2019, the extra charge attraction used to be located where Daredevil Dive: Flying Machines currently is. It was relocated later to Fiesta Bay Boardwalk.
Soaring Eagle Zipline	2015	2023	Soaring Eagle	Rockville	A 155 feet (47 m) tall Zip-line to the top of the quarry walls flying over Superman: Krypton Coaster two times. Extra Charge
