= Human (Brandy album) =

Studio album by Brandy
- Released: December 9, 2008
- Recorded: April 2005 – September 2008
- Studios: Henson; The Ravenite Social Club (Los Angeles); The Boom Boom Room (Burbank); Strawberrybee (New York City); 2nd Floor (Orlando)
- Genres: Pop; R&B
- Length: 50:01
- Labels: Knockout; Epic; Koch
- Producers: Chase N. Cashe; Dirty Swift; Dernst "D'Mile" Emile; Toby Gad; Hit-Boy; Rodney "Darkchild" Jerkins; Brian Kennedy; Bruno Mars; RedOne; Soundz; Dapo Torimiro; Bruce Wayne

Brandy chronology
The Best of Brandy (2005)	Human (2008)	Two Eleven (2012)

Singles from Human
- 1. "Right Here (Departed)" Released: September 9, 2008; 2. "Long Distance" Released: November 11, 2008

Human is the fifth studio album by American singer Brandy. It was released by Epic Records, Knockout Entertainment and Koch Records on December 9, 2008. The album marked her debut Epic Records release, following her split with Atlantic Records in 2005, and her reunion with longtime collaborator and mentor Rodney "Darkchild" Jerkins, who executively produced and wrote most of the album with his songwriting collective.

Despite being generally well-received by critics, Human debuted at number 15 on the US Billboard 200 with opening week sales of 73,000 copies, becoming Brandy's lowest-charting album since her eponymous debut (1994). As of 2012, Human has sold 214,000 copies in the United States, failing to match the commercial success of predecessors. While leading single "Right Here (Departed)" scored Brandy her biggest chart success since "Full Moon" (2002), the second and final "Long Distance" was not as commercially successful.

Human would become the only album Brandy recorded with Epic Records, after departing both the label and Roc Nation in 2009. Initially, the singer would reflect on disliking the album, describing it as too pop and blaming its lackluster performance on a lack of vision from all involved parties. Over a decade after its release, in 2022, Brandy reflected the album helped her daughter Sy'Rai through personal struggles, and would go on to express fondness for the Human album.

== Background ==
In June 2004, Brandy released her fourth studio album Afrodisiac, amidst the well-publicized termination of her short-lived business relationship with record executive and entertainment manager Benny Medina. Brandy ended her contract with his Los Angeles-based Handprint Entertainment after less than a year of representation following controversies surrounding Medina's handling of the lead single "Talk About Our Love", and failed negotiations of a purported co-headlining tour with fellow R&B singer Usher. Despite the negative publicity, Afrodisiac emerged as Brandy's most critically acclaimed album by then, but became a moderate seller on most music markets. The album debuted at number three on the Billboard 200 albums chart but while it went on to sell more than 416,000 copies in the United States, it generally failed to chart or sell noticeably elsewhere. Kanye West-produced "Talk About Our Love" reached number six on the UK Singles Chart but later singles such as "Afrodisiac" and "Who Is She 2 U" failed to score successfully on the popular music charts and promotion for the album soon ended.

At the end of 2004, after eleven years with the company, Brandy asked for and received an unconditional release from her original label Atlantic Records. By the time her contract expired, several of her longtime patrons such as music producer Darryl Williams and industry executive Sylvia Rhone had left the company and Brandy felt mismanaged by her new team of which she found was "looking more towards the hip-hop artists" on the label and "didn't know what to do with [her]." Completing her contract with Atlantic Records, a compilation album compiling her first four studio albums with the company, entitled The Best of Brandy, was released in March 2005. Thereupon, Brandy reportedly started shopping for a new record deal under Knockout Entertainment, her brother's Ray J's vanity label, which would co-venture her subsequent releases, including her fifth album, which she started recording independently.

== Recording and production ==
Brandy originally began recording her fifth studio album in 2005. Departing from her established creative approach which saw her setting up projects with former main producers such as Keith Crouch, Rodney "Darkchild" Jerkins and Timbaland, she sought a broader range of musical influences by working with a variety of songwriters and producers, including Louis Winding and Frederik Tao from Danish production team Maximum Risk. The duo produced several songs for Brandy, including both "Honey" and "Sweet Nothings," all of which were penned by frequent collaborator Kenisha Pratt. In the ensuing months, Brandy continued recording independently, without contractual constraints, collaborating with an extensive roster of producers, including Rockwilder and production duo Tim & Bob, with whom she completed multiple demo recordings. Concurrently, her new management facilitated additional sessions at Track Record Studios in North Hollywood with producer Bryan Michael Cox and his associates Adonis Shropshire, Eric Hudson and Kendrick "WyldCard" Dean. The collective was initially intended to oversee the album's production in its entirety. Together, they developed a number of ballads and mid-tempo compositions in a style consistent with their previous work, including a track titled "Make Me Cry." In June 2006, Cox publicly confirmed his role as the project's executive producer. However, subsequent shifts in the album's creative direction, prompted by further recording sessions, ultimately led to the exclusion of his contributions.

In December 2006, Brandy was involved in a fatal automobile accident on the San Diego (405) Freeway in Los Angeles. The collision resulted in the death of a 38-year-old driver whose vehicle was struck by Brandy's Range Rover. While authorities did not arrest or charge Brandy with vehicular manslaughter, citing insufficient evidence, the incident generated substantial media coverage and intense online scrutiny in the aftermath. Several civil lawsuits were filed against her; these were ultimately resolved through out-of-court settlements by her legal representatives. The incident also constituted a significant personal and professional setback. Brandy withdrew from public engagements, including her role as a judge on the second season of the television talent competition America's Got Talent, and entered a period of hiatus. Reflecting on the emotional impact of the tragedy, she emphasized the enduring nature of her grief and the burden of responsibility she continued to carry. Although the accident temporarily halted production on her album, during which she questioned whether to continue her public career, Brandy eventually resumed recording. She later described her return to the studio as a crucial step in her recovery, noting that reconnecting with music provided a sense of stability and emotional release during a profoundly difficult period, telling Billboard: "Once I got back in the studio, the butterflies went away."

In April 2008, Brandy signed with Epic Records. With much of the previously recorded material remaining unused, she resumed work with a new principal collaborator, producer Brian Kennedy. Working alongside songwriters Frank Ocean and James Fauntleroy, the team developed a series of new recordings, including "Freedom", "One Thing" and "Today" which Brandy later described as more closely aligned with the artistic direction she had originally envisioned for the project. Despite these efforts, Epic executives, dissatisfied with the material's commercial potential, strongly encouraged her to reunite with Jerkins in hopes of producing a crossover hit. Jerkins, a key collaborator on previous albums, had not worked with Brandy in years following a professional rift, arising from her concerns that he had repurposed their signature sound for other artists. Upon rejoining the project and assuming executive production duties, he ushered in a significant shift in the album's musical direction. Much of the previously recorded R&B material was set aside in favor of a more internationally oriented pop sound, and although Brandy expressed enthusiasm about their reunion, the lingering tensions in their working relationship contributed to a challenging restart. Feeling uncertain about the new direction, she perceived it at times as overly calculated or inauthentic. However, subsequent recording sessions, particularly those that produced the song "Right Here (Departed)," helped to alleviate her concerns and reaffirm her confidence in the evolving project.

While Jerkins and his team would contribute the majority of Human, Brandy insisted on collaborating with additional producers, including production duo Midi Mafia, Soundz, RedOne, Toby Gad, and Blac Elvis, a decision that later led to further tensions between the two. Additionally, she worked with Rico Love, Rob Knox, The Clutch, Chasity Nwagbara, Kara DioGuardi, and Greg Curtis on Human, though their contributions were ultimately excluded from the final tracklist. Late in the production process, Brandy briefly reunited with Timbaland, but the material from these sessions was likewise not included on the album. Further studio collaborations with Kerry "Krucial" Brothers, Missy Elliott, Yung Berg, and Tonex, by contrast, failed to materialize due to scheduling conflicts.

== Music and lyrics ==
Introduced by the words of Brandy's description of a human being on "Human Intro", the album opens with Jerkins-crafted "The Definition", one of the few uptempo recordings on the album. Written by Atlanta-based songwriter Crystal Johnson, the song depicts Brandy rhapsodizing about love. It received generally mixed reviews, with The Boston Globe emphasizing it the most essential track on Human. "Warm It Up (With Love)", another Darkchild production, was created around a piano sample and released to strong positive reactions. Highlighted by AllMusic and Slant Magazine, Newsday writer Glenn Gamboa noted it as "guiding principle" on the album. Lead single "Right Here (Departed)" was not recorded until late into the production of Human and the first song Brandy recorded with Jerkins following their musical reunification in early June 2008. Written by The Writing Camp and recorded with therapeutical background, the track chronicles a woman's talks about mutual support with loved ones. Fifth track "Piano Man" was recorded as an ode to the kind of creative relationship cultivated by a vocalist and their producer or DJ.

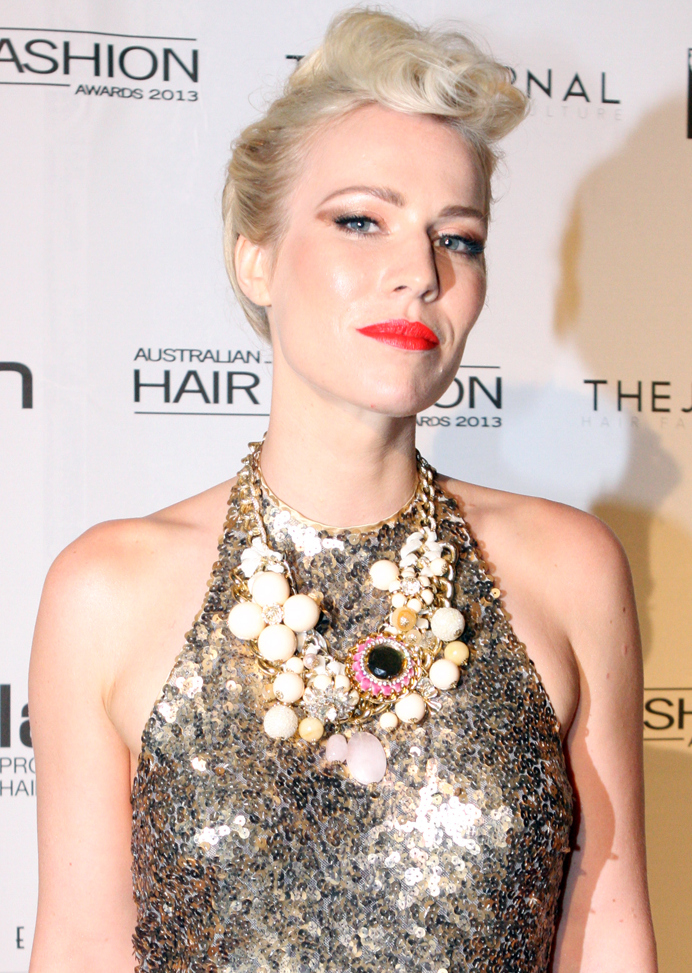
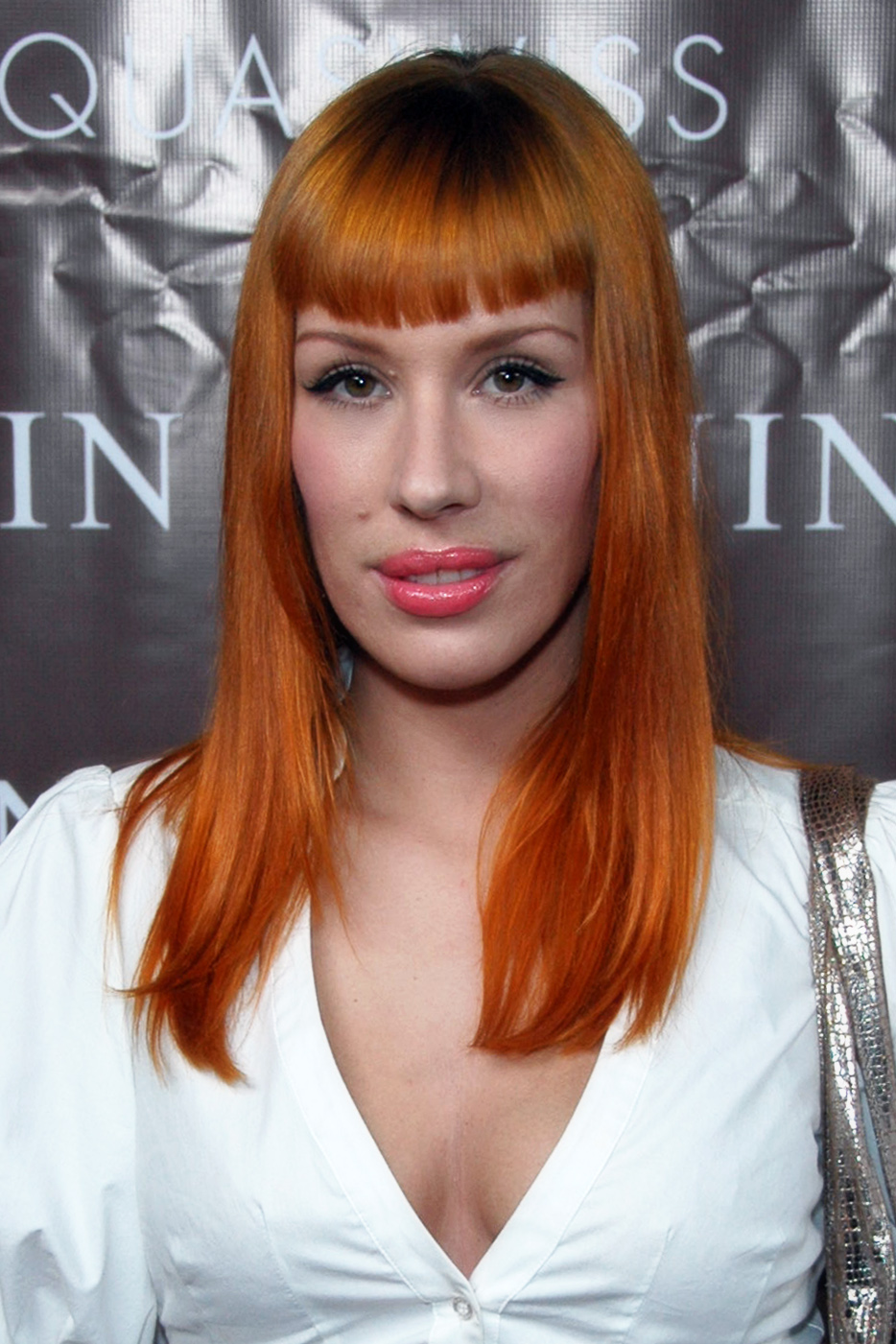
Brandy collaborated with several singers on the record. Natasha Bedingfield (left) co-wrote and recorded vocals for "Fall" while Esthero (right) penned the album's title track "Human".

"Long Distance", a ballad about the difficulties of a long-distance relationship, was released to positive reactions by critics, with The New York Times calling it an "hymnlike single that distantly echoes Janet Jackson's "Again." Eighth track "Camouflage", one out of two songs on the album that were written by songwriter Claude Kelly, garnered strong reviews in general, with Newsday declaring it a "worthy cousin to Beyoncé's "Irreplaceable" that [is] more about esteem-raising and self-improvement than a search for a sassy put-down." "Torn Down", a joint production by Midi Mafia and Dapo Torimiro, was one of the few prominent Human features on the set list of Brandy's Human World Tour (2009). Incorporating elements of country music, critics noted it a "resolute, crisp mix of static synths, acoustic guitar, and hand claps." Brandy wrote the album's title track with help from producer Toby Gad and Canadian singer Esthero. A "silky R&B anthem" as described by Newsday, the ballad deals with forgiveness. "Shattered Heart" is a downbeat track, that incorporates elements of Middle Eastern music and changes its tempo after three minutes. It has been described as the only "Timbo-esque" record on Human.

The album's twelfth track, a piano-driven ballad entitled "True", was contributed by RedOne and Claude Kelly and initially written for Michael Jackson. The song was rearranged and partially rewritten to fit Brandy's persona. It was released to positive reviews by critics, who noted it one of the stronger tracks on Human. "A Capella (Something's Missing)", produced by Soundz, is a near-a cappella song on which Brandy provides "a polyphonic cyberchorus" with multiple tracks of her own voice. Humming the bassline and providing the rhythm, the instrumentation on the track consists of a sole electric guitar. Hand-clap-laden uptempo recording "1st & Love", the album's fourteenth track, depicts a woman's euphoria with a new-found love at first sight and was discussed as the third single at times. Final track "Fall," another piano ballad, was co-written by labelmate Natasha Bedingfield. As reported, Brandy and Bedingfield were forced to move their first joint recording session from Atlanta to Los Angeles as singer Chris Brown and his entourage crashed into the studio, where they "blasted Brown's songs and horsed around."

== Artwork and release ==
Brandy revealed the title of the album as well as the name of several new songs in a press statement on August 15, 2008. Named after its title track, which she co-wrote, Brandy stated, "it's called Human because that's what I am and at the end of the day we all are only human. The album speaks for itself." Further elaborating on the title, the statement uttered that the title was "a real life mirror of Brandy as a woman, an artist, a musician and a performer, communicating what it means to be fully Human: strong yet vulnerable, candid and triumphant, in love with life and in touch with the things of the spirit." Michael Brandt handled the album's photoshoot and cover; and Fusako Chubachi handled the creative direction. The album cover depicts a close-up image of Brandy's face, with soft lighting highlighting her facial features. She gazes directly at the camera against a background that is mostly dark. Human is written in a simple font at the bottom.

Although Epic Records announced the release of Human for November 11, 2008, a call from Timbaland, who requested Brandy to record additional music with him and protegés Jerome "J-Roc" Harmon and James Fauntleroy, caused another month-long delay of the album. His tracks, however, did not make the final cut on the album track listing as he was unable to contribute trademark backing vocals to his songs. Human was first released in France on December 5, 2008, by Sony Music. On December 8, it was released in Australia and the United Kingdom, and in North America the following day, by Epic Records, Knockout Entertainment and Koch Records. The deluxe edition was released simultaneously with the standard edition through digital media stores; in addition to the original track listing, it features five songs, including bonus tracks "Gonna Find My Love" and "Locket (Locked In Love)", and remixes of "Right Here (Departed)" and "Long Distance", the latter of which feature contribution by English DJ Moto Blanco and Jamaican American rapper Sean Kingston. Elsewhere, Human was not released until February 2009. In Japan, Sony Music Japan released a limited edition with a 3-video bonus DVD, including music videos and the making of "Right Here (Departed)".

== Promotion ==
=== Singles ===
"Right Here (Departed)" premiered on Brandy's official webpage on August 13, 2008 and was released as the album's lead single on September 9, 2008. While the song charted moderately in the United States, where it reached number 34 on the Billboard Hot 100, the track became Brandy's highest-charting single in years elsewhere, reaching the top ten of the French Singles Chart, and the top 20 on the Japan Hot 100. It also peaked at number 22 on the US Hot R&B/Hip-Hop Songs and became Brandy's first number-one hit on the Hot Dance Club Play chart. An accompanying music video for "Right Here (Departed)" was directed by Little X and filmed in Los Angeles in August 2008. It reached number one on BET's 106 & Park countdown and was voted 69th on BET: Notarized top 100 videos of 2008.

"Long Distance," co-written and produced by Bruno Mars, was released by Epic Records as the second single from Human on November 11, 2008. The song became the album's second consecutive Hot Dance Club Play number-one and peaked at number 38 on the Billboard Hot R&B/Hip-Hop Songs chart; though it failed to enter the Hot 100. Upon its television debut, the Chris Robinson-directed music video for "Long Distance" came in at number nine on the 106 & Park countdown on December 22, 2008, and peaked at the top position in January 2009. While Brandy considered both "Piano Man" and "1st & Love" as potential third single candidates, plans for another single from Human failed to materialize.

=== Appearances and live performances ===
During a promotional tour in support of the album, Brandy stopped by BET's 106 & Park to perform a five-piece mini-concert that featured the first two singles from the album in addition to "What About Us?", "Full Moon" (both 2002) and "Almost Doesn't Count" (1999). In addition, she launched the worldwide release of the album on the morning television program Good Morning America with an interview and a performance of "Right Here (Departed)." Throughout December, Brandy appeared on other television shows such as The Tyra Banks Show and CW11's Morning Show. In support of the album, Brandy was also featured on the November 2008 cover of American weekly magazine Jet. Promotion on the album ended soon after its release and Brandy subsequently started work on a second album with Epic Records. Amongst those to record with her were songwriting and production partners Tricky Stewart, The-Dream, Stargate, Ne-Yo, and Human collaborator Brian Kennedy.

After a small promotional tour in the fall of 2008, which saw her perform at several music festivals, Brandy embarked on a concert tour in February 2009 to further promote Human, titled Human World Tour. In addition to performing tracks from Human, Brandy also showcased songs from her earlier albums, Brandy, Never Say Never, Full Moon and Afrodisiac, a set that was largely inspired by her BET concert special Brandy: Just Human, which aired on December 5, 2008. The tour began in Athens, Ohio on February 7, 2009, and concluded in Okmulgee, Oklahoma on June 19, 2009; some concerts were part of annual events such as the Milwaukee Pridefest and the San Jose Pride. Selected venues featured supporting appearances by Colby O'Donis, Ray J, Bell X1, and Samsaya.

== Critical reception ==
Professional ratings
Aggregate scores
Source	Rating
Metacritic	67/100
Review scores
Source	Rating
AllMusic	3/5 stars
Blender	3/5 stars
Digital Spy	3/5 stars
Entertainment Weekly	B
The Guardian	4/5 stars
musicOMH	3/5 stars
Los Angeles Times	1.5/4 stars
RWD	4/5 stars
Slant	3/5 stars
USA Today	3/4 stars

While Human became Brandy's first effort not to be nominated for a Grammy Award in any category, it received generally favorable reviews from music critics, averaging a 67 out of a 100 among averaged reviews on Metacritic. Sarah Rodman of The Boston Globe complimented the album as appropriately rich and varied: "It's better than good enough. It's a light, breezy listen that shows off Brandy's resilience, humility, joy, and vibrancy." She especially highlighted Jerkins' input on the album: "Jerkins manages to bring out the expressive best in her pleasantly raspy vocalizing." Alex Macpherson from The Guardian called Human "a thoughtful, intimate work on which Brandy sings movingly about fragility and fear," giving it four and a half stars out of five, while Erika Ramirez, writing for Vibe found that the album "radiates as a triumphant return. Her depth and sincerity indeed prove that Brandy is perfectly human."

Andy Kellman of AllMusic called the album Brandy's "most platitudinal" and "least enjoyable release in her catalog," adding: "Brandy is clearly in a comfort zone that enables her to open up more than ever [...] Human is nothing if not a serious album. But it could very well be her most useful one." He gave the album three and half stars out of five. Mariel Concepcion from Billboard said that "while Human is missing the sassy Brandy we know and love from such tracks like "I Wanna Be Down" and "Talk About Our Love," we can still appreciate the much-needed solace of setting personal turmoil to memorable music." In his review for Entertainment Weekly, Henry Goldblatt noted "the huskiness that defined Brandy's prior work has been replaced by wispier and higher tones. The result is pleasant but far less ambitious than her last CD, 2004's Afrodisiac."

Jon Dolan, writing for Blender, gave the album three out of five stars and commended Brandy's decision to re-team with Jerkins: "Now she's gone back to girlie hip-hop Eden; four songs were written by Jerkins, author of her best late-'90s hits. Fluttery jams about long distance longing and time-suspending slow dances are balanced by grown-up moments of deeply felt, if slightly weird, balladic fortitude." Jon Pareles from The New York Times felt that the sentiments of the songs, whether self-affirming or heartbroken, were back to generic ones: "Song titles like "Torn Down" and "Shattered Heart"' show how much Brandy is trying to get serious, taking on an adult world where happily ever after is elusive. But she still comes across as a fledgling, a personality still being formed, eagerly tagging along after her role models." Mikael Wood's review for Los Angeles Times was less emphatic. He gave the album one and a half stars out of four, and said: "Unfortunately, it's also hard to make it through the thing. Brandy's strong suit has never been her thoughtfulness; appropriately for someone with her Hollywood history, she's long been one of R&B's emptiest vessels, a gorgeous voice used by a series of gifted producers to communicate their own unique ideas."

== Commercial performance ==
In the United States, Human debuted and peaked at number 15 on the Billboard 200 in the week of December 17, 2008, with first-week sales of 73,000 copies. This marked Brandy's lowest opening sales for an album by then and was a considerable drop from her previous effort Afrodisiac, which had opened to 131,700 units in 2004. Human also became her lowest-peaking studio album on the Billboard 200 since her self-titled debut album, which had peaked at number 20 in 1994. The album also reached number six on the US Digital Albums and became Brandy's fifth consecutive top-five album on the Top R&B/Hip-Hop Albums chart, peaking at number five. Billboard eventually ranked it 40th on its Top R&B/Hip-Hop Albums 2009 year-end chart. Elsewhere, Human widely underperformed upon its release. While lead single "Right Here (Departed)" became Brandy's highest-charting single in years throughout Europe, the album failed to enter most international album charts, although it reached the top 50 on the Wallonian Albums Chart and top 200 on the French Albums Chart. In 2012, Billboard reported that Human had sold 214,000 copies in the United States by then.

Expressing her dissatisfaction with Human's commercial performance, Brandy told British music magazine Blues & Soul in April 2009 that she was "a little disappointed about that" but also felt "pleased that Sony" had greenlit the production of a second album with Epic Records which she expected to feature contribution from StarGate, Ne-Yo, Tricky Stewart, The-Dream, and Brian Kennedy. She further commented: "In hindsight I do feel the last album was a little political. So a lotta changes have been made since Human – and hopefully they're changes for the better! Because, having got all the deep stuff off my chest, I'm now able to really tap into the fun part of music again [...] it's exactly the type of album that I need to be making right now!" While Brandy co-wrote and recorded several songs with her team, a planned second album with Epic, never came to fruition with some of the material later given to other Sony artists such as Jennifer Lopez and Rihanna after Brandy had parted ways with Epic.

== Creative differences and label impact ==
In mid-2009, Epic ended their contract with Brandy following the appointment of Amanda Ghost as the label's new president, making Human her only album with the company, and leaving a follow-up incomplete and unreleased. A Los Angeles Times article later revealed Brandy's discontent with the success of the project when asked about the commercial failure of Human the following year: "It was lacking my belief in it. It lacked my vision. Pretty much bottom line, if you don't believe in something it's not going to go," she said. "So do I believe that Human was as creative as Never Say Never and Full Moon? No, I do not. You definitely want to put something out that's like that. I felt at the same time I could have had much better songs and a much better set-up." A statement she made during a 2010 interview with Out magazine turned out more harsh: "To hell with that album! [...] Where I felt creatively it could've gone and the space I was in creatively, I needed everybody around me to be in that same space. It would've been a different album, but with the same inspiration and same blessing for other people. It would've been hotter music and a hotter look."

Blaming herself for the album's commercial results, Brandy dismissed the album as "too pop," implicitly criticizing the creative approach encouraged by her team, who had urged her to pursue a more crossover-oriented sound. Commenting on this decision, she later elaborated: "I was listening to the voice of my team more so than what was going on inside of me. With Human, I felt like I wanted to do more R&B music and that's not what we decided to do on that album." The debut season of her 2010 VH1 reality series Brandy and Ray J: A Family Business further revealed that the album's underperformance resulted in another argument between her and executive producer Rodney Jerkins, whose commitment to the project Brandy felt not as "creative and forthcoming" as on previous albums and that he purposefully did not put his best work in the album. Jerkins had distanced himself from the project following its official release, declaring his dissatisfaction with the involvement of other producers on the album. The dispute ultimately prompted Brandy to sever professional ties with Jerkins, and as of March 2026, the two have not collaborated again since.

== Retrospective reception ==
Human was not considered a commercial success at the time of its release and even was met with distance by Brandy who according to Quentin Harrison of Albumism, was disappointed with the performance and handling of Human by Epic Records. Despite this, Harrison reported that fans remained affectionate towards the album over the years, including expressing a preference for Human over its follow up, Two Eleven (2012). In 2010, while competing on the second season of the NBC hit reality singing competition show The Sing-Off the all male vocal group Committed interpolated the song "A Capella (Something's Missing)" by incorporating pieces of it within their cover of the OneRepublic and Timbaland song "Apologize". The group were met with unanimous praise by the shows's judges and went on to win the contest. In 2023, American singer Tiffany Red, when interviewed on the R&B Money podcast, named "A Capella (Something's Missing)" as one of her five favorite R&B songs of all time. In 2024, Brandy would later reveal – also after learning her daughter Sy'Rai had stated how much the album [Human] had helped her go through personal quarrels – that she does in fact love the album, singling out "Locket (Locked in Love)" as her personal favorite. In January 2022, she responded to a fan on Twitter who did not like that Brandy was not fond of Human, by saying "I am now." In 2024, singer Normani cited it as an inspiration for the song "Insomnia", off her debut album Dopamine (2024), explaining: "There's a record called "A Capella (Something’s Missing)" by her [from 2008], and I went in with that inspiration with [producers] Stargate. I was like, "I want to capture this feeling." And that's exactly what we did."

== Track listing ==
Human – Standard edition
No.	Title	Writer(s)	Producer(s)	Length
1.	"Human Intro"			0:19
2.	"The Definition"	Rodney "Darkchild" Jerkins; Crystal Johnson	Jerkins; LaShawn "Big Shiz" Daniels^{[a]}	3:43
3.	"Warm It Up (With Love)"	Jerkins; Marvin "Tony" Hemmings; Jordan Omley	Jerkins; Omley^{[a]}	3:58
4.	"Right Here (Departed)"	Jerkins; E. Kidd Bogart; David Quiñones; Victoria Horn; Erika Nuri	Jerkins; Daniels^{[a]}	3:38
5.	"Piano Man"	Jerkins; Hemmings; Omley	Jerkins; Omley^{[a]}	3:52
6.	"Long Distance Interlude"			0:59
7.	"Long Distance"	Bruno Mars; Philip Lawrence; Jerkins; Jeff Bhasker	Mars^{[b]}; Jerkins; Lawrence^{[a]}; James Fauntleroy^{[a]}	3:51
8.	"Camouflage"	Claude Kelly; Jerkins	Jerkins; Dernst "D'Mile" Emile; Daniels^{[a]}	3:59
9.	"Torn Down"	Kevin Risto; Waynne Nugent; Dapo Torimiro; Fauntleroy	Dirty Swift; Torimiro; Bruce Wayne; Fauntleroy^{[a]}	3:20
10.	"Human"	Brandy Norwood; Toby Gad; Lindy Robbins; Jenny-Bea Englishman	Gad^{[b]}; Brandy^{[b]}	3:47
11.	"Shattered Heart"	Jerkins; Johnson; Daniels	Jerkins; Daniels^{[b]}	3:48
12.	"True"	RedOne; Kelly	RedOne	3:40
13.	"A Capella (Something's Missing)"	Kenneth Charles Coby; Chad C. Roper; Le'Che D. Martin; Tiyon Mack	Soundz	3:29
14.	"1st & Love"	Chauncey Hollis; Rich King; Christopher Breaux; Jesse Woodard	Hit-Boy; Chase N. Cashe	3:17
15.	"Fall"	Brian Seals; Brandy; Natasha Bedingfield; Daniels	Brian Kennedy; Daniels^{[a]}	4:21
Total length:				50:01

Notes

- ^{^[a]} denotes vocal producer
- ^{^[b]} denotes main and vocal producer
- ^{^[c]} denotes additional producter

== Personnel ==
Credits adapted from the liner notes of Human.

- Mattias Bylund – live strings (track 12), string arrangement
- Tania Maxwell Clements – backing vocals
- LaShawn Daniels – vocal producer (tracks 2, 4, 8, 11, 15)
- Mike Donaldson – recording engineer (tracks 2–5, 8, 11)
- Chase N. Cashe – producer (track 14)
- Fusako Chubachi – art direction
- Brandon Creed – executive producer
- James Fauntleroy – vocal producer (tracks 7, 9)
- Paul Foley – recording engineer (tracks 2–5, 8, 11)
- Jens Gad – drums (track 10)
- Toby Gad – guitar, bass guitar, arranger, programming, producer, vocal producer, vocal engineer (track 10)
- Brian Gardner – mastering
- Daniel Groover – guitar (track 14)
- Andy Gwynn – recording engineer (track 14)
- Marvin "Tony" Hemmings – keyboards, programming, producer, composer, instrument programming (tracks 2–5)
- Hit-Boy – producer (track 14)
- Rodney Jerkins – backing vocals, musician (tracks 2–5, 11), producer, mixing (tracks 2–5, 7–8, 11), string section arranger, string section conductor (track 4), executive producer
- Kee – backing vocals (track 12)
- Claude Kelly – vocal arrangement
- Brian Kennedy – producer (track 15)
- Rich King – vocal producer, arranger
- Alice Lord – viola
- Bruno Mars – producer, vocal producer (track 7)
- Adam Messinger – piano (track 12), keyboards
- John D. Norten – engineer (tracks 13, 15)
- Brandy Norwood – lead vocals (all tracks), backing vocals (tracks 10, 12), executive producer, vocal producer (tracks 2–5, 7–15), vocal arranger (tracks 2–5, 7, 9–15), arranger (track 8)
- Greg Ogan – engineer (tracks 2, 7, 15), vocal engineer (track 10)
- Jordan Omley – vocal producer (tracks 3, 5)
- Chris Plata – producer
- RedOne – backing vocals, piano, other instruments, instrument programming, producer, live strings arranger, vocal arranger, vocal editing, engineer (track 12)
- Jim Sitterly – violin (track 10)
- Soundz – producer (track 13)
- Dapo Torimiro – producer (track 9), guitar, keyboards, programming
- Bruce Waynne – music producer (track 9)

== Charts ==
=== Weekly charts ===
Weekly chart performance for Human
Chart (2008–09)	Peak position
Belgian Albums (Ultratop Flanders)	81
Belgian Albums (Ultratop Wallonia)	50
French Albums (SNEP)	129
Japanese Albums (Oricon)	37
UK R&B Albums (Official Charts)	34
US Billboard 200	15
US Top R&B/Hip-Hop Albums (Billboard)	5

=== Year-end charts ===
Year-end chart performance for Human
Chart (2009)	Position
US Billboard 200	173
US Top R&B/Hip-Hop Albums (Billboard)	40

== Release history ==
Release dates and formats for Human
Region	Date	Edition(s)	Format(s)	Label(s)	Ref.
France	December 5, 2008	Standard; deluxe	CD; digital download	Sony Music	
Australia	December 8, 2008	Standard; deluxe	CD; digital download	Sony Music	
United Kingdom	December 8, 2008	Standard; deluxe	CD; digital download	RCA	
Canada	December 9, 2008	Standard; deluxe	CD; digital download	Sony Music	
United States	December 9, 2008	Standard; deluxe	CD; digital download	Epic; Knockout; Koch	
Japan	February 18, 2009	Standard; deluxe	CD; digital download	Sony Music	
Belgium	February 23, 2009	Standard; deluxe	CD; digital download	Sony Music	
Japan	March 22, 2009	Limited	CD; digital download	Sony Music	
Germany	March 27, 2009	Standard; deluxe	CD; digital download	Sony Music	
