= Tom & Jerry (roller coaster) =

Steel roller coaster

Tom y Jerry: Picnic en el Parque
- Previously known as Boardwalk Canyon Blaster at Six Flags Fiesta Texas (2000-2001) (unbuilt)
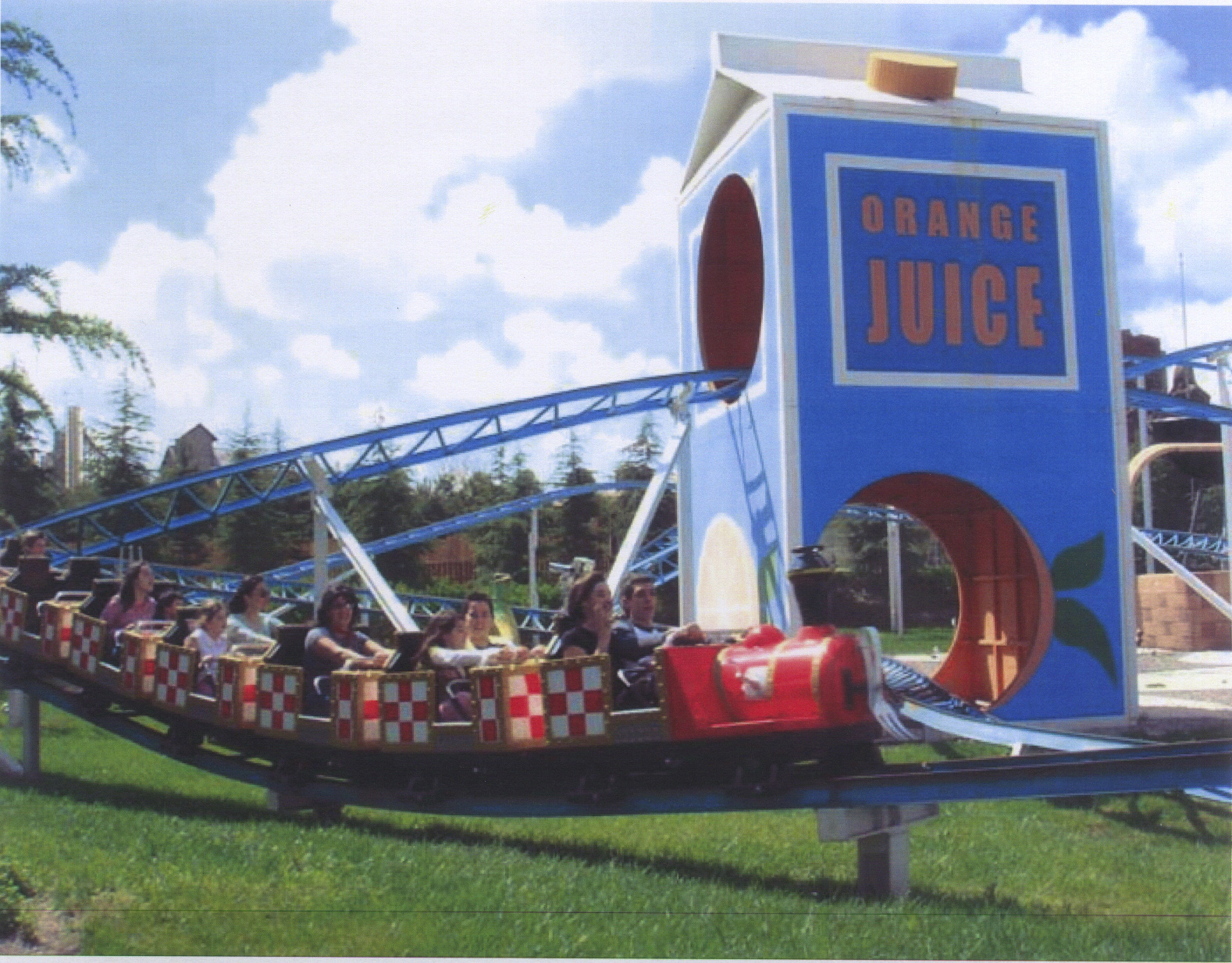

Parque Warner Madrid
- Location: Parque Warner Madrid
- Park section: Cartoon Village
- Coordinates: 40.2298°N 3.5961°W
- Status: Operating
- Opening date: 6 April 2002; 24 years ago

General statistics
- Type: Steel – Family
- Manufacturer: Zierer
- Height: 26 ft (7.9 m)
- Length: 1,181 ft (360 m)
- Speed: 22 mph (35 km/h)
- Inversions: 0
- Duration: 1:05
- Capacity: 1250 riders per hour
- Tom y Jerry: Picnic en el Parque at RCDB

Tom y Jerry: Picnic en el Parque (Tom and Jerry: Picnic in the Park) is a Zierer Tivoli steel, sit-down family roller coaster at Parque Warner Madrid near Madrid, Spain. The coaster is named and themed after Warner Bros.' Tom and Jerry franchise.

== Ride experience ==
The ride is themed to a picnic, with its entrance themed to a Tom and Jerry comic book with statues of Tom Cat and Jerry Mouse atop it. The coaster's train (themed to a clockwork train) is made up of 20 cars. Riders are arranged 2 across in a single row for a total of 40 riders per train. The train caters for 1250 riders per hour. The ride features an incline of 7.9 metres and reaches a top speed of 35 km/h (22 mph). Riders can purchase on-ride photographs taken during the ride.

== History ==
Manufactured by Zierer and installed by Stengel Engineering, the roller coaster (then under the name Boardwalk Canyon Blaster) was intended to be the second new roller coaster at Six Flags Fiesta Texas for the 2000 season, with Superman: Krypton Coaster being the first. The ride was listed on park maps, delivered to the park and kept in the employee parking lot. However, it was never built as the park exceeded its yearly budget. The coaster would sit in storage in the employee parking lot behind Poltergeist for the rest of the 2000 season.

In 2001, the ride was relocated to then under construction Parque Warner Madrid (then known as Warner Bros. Movie World Madrid), where it was assembled and opened as Tom y Jerry: Picnic en el Parque when the park opened on 6 April 2002. The ride was designed by Bruce L. Green at Green Hall Design and Corpórea Escultura, with concept art by Robin Hall. The train was originally going to have a fibreglass figure of Jerry Mouse ride on the front car, controlling the train with a steering wheel in the train's smokestack.
