= Human World Tour =

2009 concert tour by Brandy

- Tour by Brandy
- Associated album: Human
- Start date: February 7, 2009
- End date: June 19, 2009
- Legs: 2
- No. of shows: 10 in North America; 10 in Europe; 5 in Asia; 25 total

Brandy concert chronology
- Never Say Never World Tour (1999); Human World Tour (2009); Slayana World Tour (2016)

The Human World Tour was the second solo concert tour by American recording artist, Brandy. Often acknowledged as the Just Human Tour, the outing supported her fifth studio album, Human. The tour was the singer's first concert tour in nearly ten years and was well received by the public and critics. The tour primarily visited North America and Europe, with a few dates in Asia.

== Background ==
While promoting her recent album, Brandy mentioned in several interviews her hope to tour the album. She felt enthusiastic about returning to the stage and performing for a huge audience. She also mentioned how she wanted to return overseas. During the Fall of 2008, Brandy embarked on a small promotional tour, performing mostly at music festivals. The tour began early in 2009 and ran through to the summer. Taking a cue from the BET special, "Just Human", the singer wanted to perform intimate shows to allow the audience to connect with her. The singer chose to perform in concert hall, theatres and nightclubs versus the usual sports arena. The main goal of the show was to be simplistic and draw a connection to the singer and the audience. During the tour, Brandy performed her hits from previous albums along with a few selections from Human.

== Supporting acts ==
- Colby O'Donis (North America) (select venues)
- Ray J (North America) (select venues)
- Bell X1 (Europe) (select venues)
- Samsaya (Europe) (select venues)

== Set list ==
This set list is from the concert in London, UK on May 7, 2009.

1. "Can You Feel Me? (intro)"
2. "Afrodisiac"
3. "Who Is She 2 U"
4. "What About Us?"
5. "Full Moon"
6. "Almost Doesn't Count"
7. "Top of the World"
8. "Best Friend"
9. "I Wanna Be Down"
10. "The Boy Is Mine"
11. "Torn Down"
12. "Long Distance"
13. "Have You Ever?"
14. "Right Here (Departed)"

== Shows ==
Date	City	Country	Venue
North America
February 7, 2009	Athens	United States	TBAM Auditorium
February 9, 2009	Fairborn	United States	McLin Gym
February 14, 2009	Reno	United States	Grand Theatre
February 16, 2009	Atlanta	United States	Rialto Center for the Arts
March 12, 2009	San Antonio	United States	Lone Star Lil's Amphitheater
April 16, 2009	Montevallo	United States	Palmer Auditorium
April 19, 2009	Phoenix	United States	Orpheum Theatre
Europe
May 7, 2009	London	England	indigO_{2}
May 8, 2009	Paris	France	Bataclan
May 9, 2009	Amsterdam	Netherlands	Paradiso
May 10, 2009	Brussels	Belgium	Ancienne Belgique
May 11, 2009	Clermont-Ferrand	France	Bbox Club
May 12, 2009	Basel	Switzerland	The Flower by Grand Casino Basel
May 13, 2009	Copenhagen	Denmark	Vega
May 14, 2009	Gothenburg	Sweden	Restaurang Trädgårn
May 15, 2009	Oslo	Norway	Sentrum Scene
May 16, 2009	Malmö	Sweden	Kulturbolaget
Asia
May 25, 2009	Tokyo	Japan	Billboard Live
May 26, 2009	Tokyo	Japan	Billboard Live
May 27, 2009	Tokyo	Japan	Billboard Live
May 29, 2009	Osaka	Japan	Billboard Live
May 30, 2009	Osaka	Japan	Billboard Live
North America
June 13, 2009^{[A]}	Milwaukee	United States	Miller Stage
June 14, 2009^{[B]}	San Jose	United States	Guadalupe River Park and Gardens
June 19, 2009^{[C]}	Okmulgee	United States	Claude Cox Omniplex

Festivals and other miscellaneous performances

^{A} This concert was a part of the Milwaukee Pridefest
^{B} This concert was a part of San Jose Pride.
^{C} This concert was a part of the Muscogee (Creek) Nation Festival
