= Abstraxion =

French electronic music producer and DJ

- Born: Harold Boué
- Origin: Marseille, France
- Genres: Electronic music, house, techno, electronica
- Occupations: Record producer, musician, DJ
- Years active: 2005–present
- Labels: Biologic Records, Different Recordings, HAKT, Dischi Autunno

Abstraxion is the stage name of French electronic music producer and DJ Harold Boué. He founded Biologic Records in 2005 and later released music under the name Lion's Drums.

== Career ==
Boué founded Biologic Records in 2005 and released his first EP, Exposition, under the name Abstraxion. In 2011, he released two EPs through the PIAS-affiliated label Different Recordings.

Resident Advisor reviewed Temple of the Sun in 2009. James Reeves contrasted its darker sound with the electro of the earlier EP Six Eight, while noting the unpredictability of Boué's productions.

Abstraxion's first album, Break of Lights, was released in 2013 through HAKT and Biologic Records. Nicolas Jaar subsequently licensed it for his Other People subscription label. Pitchfork reviewed the album tracks "Rising" and "Moon", including Factory Floor's remix of the latter.

In 2014, Boué became artistic director of the LAB club nights at Cabaret Aléatoire in Marseille. John Talabot appeared at the first event. Ventilo reported that touring after Break of Lights had taken Boué to Tokyo, Copenhagen, San Francisco and Bogotá.

Boué and Danish producer Kasper Bjørke recorded the EP Origami in Copenhagen. It was released in 2015. His second album, She Thought She Would Last Forever, followed in 2016. Its release was preceded by the EP Resonance, which included remixes by Matrixxman, Fort Romeau and Massimiliano Pagliara. Abstraxion also performed live at Panorama Bar in Berlin that year.

Boué later used the name Lion's Drums for work based more heavily on percussion and field recordings. For the album Kagabas, he spent a week in 2019 recording songs and environmental sounds with a Kagaba community in the Sierra Nevada de Santa Marta in Colombia. The recordings were combined with studio compositions and released as an album in 2021.

In 2025, Boué released the Abstraxion EP Void Sequence EP on Biologic Records and appeared on the France Inter programme Côté Club.

== Cultural projects ==
Boué developed the Encore Encore festival with the Laboratoire des Possibles collective. An inaugural event planned for Correns in 2020 was cancelled. The festival was first held there in 2021, with a programme combining electronic and contemporary music.

In a 2022 interview with Laura Legeay for Ventilo, Boué said that the organisers worked with the village on the programme and considered local supply chains, consumption and travel by artists and staff.

Boué later founded Sauna Radio at Eden Bastun, a public sauna on the shore of Lake Mälaren in Stockholm. The station began broadcasting on 5 July 2025 from a DJ booth at the venue.

The station features Swedish artists and international guests. Boué cited NTS Radio, The Lot Radio and Kiosk Radio as influences on its programming.

== Discography ==
Boué's releases under the Abstraxion and Lion's Drums names include:

=== As Abstraxion ===
==== Studio albums ====
- Break of Lights (2013)
- She Thought She Would Last Forever (2016)
- Burning (2023)

==== Remix albums ====
- She Thought She Would Last Forever Remixed (2016)

==== EPs and singles ====
- Exposition (2005)
- Chip Count (2006)
- Sleepless Night-Sitting (2007)
- Six Eight (2008)
- Temple of the Sun (2009)
- Mickey Rourke (Krikor Remix) (2010)
- Jus Acid (2011)
- Jaipur's Elephant (2011)
- Moribayasa (2012)
- Moon (2013)
- Dark Night EP (2013)
- I Can't (2014)
- Origami E.P. (with Kasper Bjørke, 2015)
- Resonance (2016)
- Spazieren (2016)
- Matin Nuit EP (with Kasper Bjørke, 2017)
- Black Vulture (2019)
- Trance Body Music (2023)
- Ignition (2024)
- Ignition (Remixed) (2024)
- Void Sequence EP (2025)
- Cuica Orbita (2026)
- Lendemain de fête (2026)

=== As Lion's Drums ===
==== Studio albums ====
- Kagabas (2021)
- La Batterie (2022)

==== EPs ====
- Lion's Drums (2018)
- Lion's Drums Edits: Manos Tsangaris Drüm (with Manos Tsangaris, 2021)
