= Full Moon (Brandy album) =

Studio album by Brandy
- Released: February 20, 2002
- Recorded: June–November 2001
- Studios: Hartman Way; Human Rhythm; Record One; Record Plant; Studio C (Los Angeles); O'Henry (Burbank); The Hit Factory (New York City); Darkchild (Pleasantville); The Studio (Philadelphia); 2nd Floor (Orlando); Hit Factory Criteria (Miami)
- Genres: R&B; pop
- Length: 72:58
- Label: Atlantic
- Producers: Brandy Norwood; Rodney Jerkins; Big Bert; Stuart Brawley; Warryn Campbell; Mike City; Keith Crouch; Jason Derlatka; Fred Jerkins III

Brandy chronology
Never Say Never (1998)	Full Moon (2002)	Afrodisiac (2004)

Singles from Full Moon
- 1. "What About Us?" Released: January 10, 2002; 2. "Full Moon" Released: April 1, 2002; 3. "He Is" Released: July 29, 2002

Full Moon is the third studio album by American singer Brandy. It was released on February 20, 2002, by Atlantic Records. The album was recorded primarily during the summer and fall of 2001 at the Hit Factory Criteria in Miami, amid a three-year musical hiatus following the success of her multi-platinum previous studio album Never Say Never (1998) and the finale of her successful television sitcom Moesha in May 2001. As with Never Say Never, Brandy collaborated with producer Rodney Jerkins and his Darkchild production and songwriting team on the majority of the album's composition, while Mike City, Warryn Campbell, and Keith Crouch contributed additional production.

Brandy credited Whitney Houston, Kim Burrell and Enya for inspiring her to push the limits of her voice and vocal arrangements. Jerkins credited Michael Jackson, Brandy's voice, and his experiences at European nightclubs for influencing the sound of the album. Her prior relationship and then-private relationship with Darkchild in-house producer Big Bert inspired the lyrics and song concepts. Musically, Full Moon is an R&B and pop album that incorporates various genres such as 2-step garage, electro, and soul.

The album was initially met with mixed reviews from critics, but later earned retrospective acclaim from musicians, singers, and producers, primarily for Brandy's vocal work and the album's lasting impact on R&B. It debuted at number two on the US Billboard 200 and atop the US Top R&B/Hip-Hop Albums, selling 156,000 copies in its first week, and has been certified platinum by the Recording Industry Association of America (RIAA), selling over one million copies in the United States. Full Moon was nominated for several awards, including the Grammy Award for Best Contemporary R&B Album. The album spawned three singles–"What About Us?", "Full Moon" and "He Is".

== Background ==
In June 1998, Norwood released her second album Never Say Never. Boosted by the success of its number-one lead single "The Boy Is Mine", a duet with singer Monica, it facilitated Norwood in becoming a viable recording artist with cross-media appeal. The album spawned seven singles, including Norwood's second number-one song, the Diane Warren-penned "Have You Ever?". Also in 1998, Norwood made her big screen debut as Karla Wilson, a supporting role in the slasher sequel, I Still Know What You Did Last Summer. which garnered her an MTV Movie Award nomination for Best Breakthrough Female Performance. The following year, she co-starred with Diana Ross in the telefilm drama Double Platinum about an intense, strained relationship between a mother and daughter. Both Norwood and Ross served as executive producers of the movie, which features original songs from Never Say Never and Ross's Every Day Is a New Day (1999).

In November 1999 Norwood was hospitalized for dehydration and exhaustion, which was later revealed to be related to a nervous breakdown that resulted from her then-hectic unhealthy lifestyle as well as an abusive relationship. Frightened by the idea that a yet-to-be-made third album would not be able to live up to the success of her previous albums, Norwood went on a lengthy hiatus to reflect and introspect. "I needed to rejuvenate, get my creative juices flowing, balance my life with some privacy, to find my confidence, find my love of music again," she told Jet magazine in 2002. In mid-2000, she started refocusing herself on her musical career, contributing songs to albums such as Urban Renewal (2001) and the Osmosis Jones soundtrack (2001). During this time her voice started to change, she had developed a scratchy, evocative edge to her voice and now having a deeper and warmer tone with a textured lower register and notably stronger head voice.

== Recording and production ==
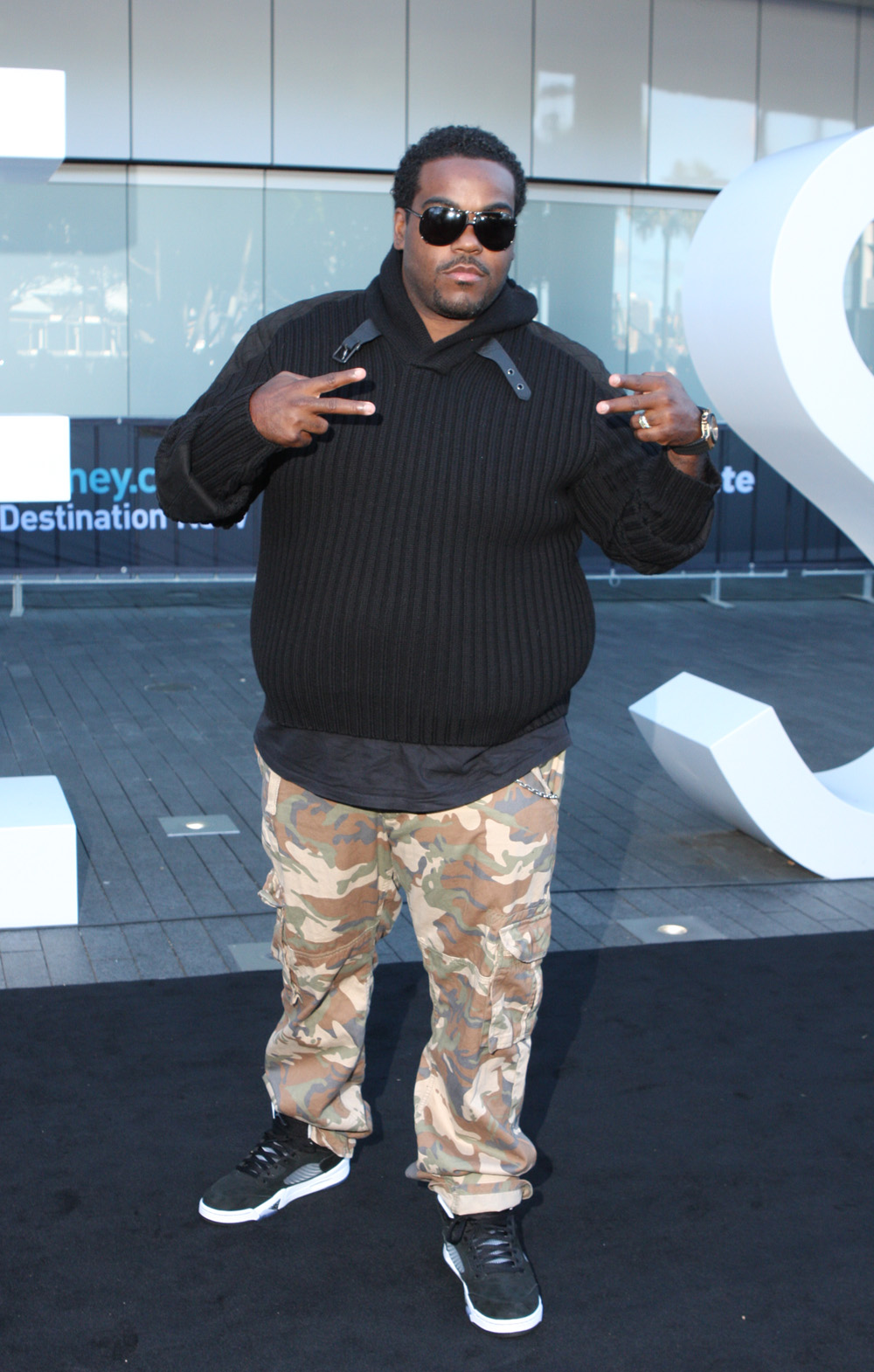
Brandy reteamed with Rodney Jerkins (pictured) and his team to work the majority of Full Moon.

In fall 2000, Norwood finally began conceiving ideas for a third studio album with the Atlantic label. While Rodney Jerkins, the main producer of her previous album Never Say Never, and his Darkchild crew, including Fred Jerkins III and LaShawn Daniels, had been working on several new songs for the singer's upcoming project in hopes of recreating the winning chemistry of Never Say Never, Norwood wanted to make sure she was gaining more creative control over the project and thus, arranged meetings with all her writers and musicians to discuss the lyrical topics and sounds she wanted for the album. "I was involved from A to Z," she said. "Every song on the album was inspired by my life [...] I wanted to talk about how I feel on so many levels. I wanted to be in touch with all of my emotions and share them. I've taken three years off for myself and got a chance to find things I like to do, things I don't like and things I want to change about myself."

While Jerkins maintained his status as the album's executive producer, contributing most to its track listing with his team that also consisted of regular songwriters Nora Payne and Kenisha Pratt, Norwood also worked with frequent collaborators Mike City and Keith Crouch, as well as Warryn "Baby Dubb" Campbell, Stuart Brawley, Jason Derlatka, and Jerkins' cousin Robert "Big Bert" Smith, with whom she became romantically involved during the project. In addition, she also recorded with Pharrell Williams and Chad Hugo from The Neptunes. With Norwood fearing that the pair's material would not fit the concept of the album and break her type of production unit, it was left unused. Rapper Ja Rule, singer Babyface and production duo Soulshock & Karlin were reportedly also involved into the project but none of their songs eventually made the album's final track listing.

Though Norwood has acknowledged that the creative focus of the album was very much on its technical realization and its sound, she declared Full Moon a concept album based on the development of a male-female relationship: "It's definitely the concept for the album – me falling in love, then going through some turbulence, and then, at the end, I find the person that I really want to be with – so it's a great concept and it's a great experience that I had. I found out a lot about myself. I found a lot out about love, and I'm just happy to have that reflect in my music." Norwood decided to name the album after its title track and in reference to the previous three years of her life, stating: "I have done a complete circle and I feel whole. All of that's reflected in the music. That's why I entitled [my album] Full Moon. It's a concept album, it's autobiographical. Everything that I've gone through in the last three years is reflected."

In a 2022 retrospective of the Full Moon recording process, Norwood shared to Billboard, "[ Aaliyah and Timbaland ] were our biggest inspirations. Rodney will tell you that Timbaland is one of his favorite producers. I will tell you the same thing. Aaliyah, her tone, and she stacked vocals, too. She was so amazing. Her music still today is timeless. There’s a song on Full Moon, it’s called “Anybody,” and it’s like an Aaliyah song [...] We just loved how they did what they were guided to do. And I was like, “We gotta do that"."

== Music and lyrics ==
Full Moon opens with "B Rocka Intro", a shortened and rearranged version of "What About Us?" that starts with a robot voice. The title of the intro references producer Rodney Jerkins's nickname for Brandy. The first full song on the album is title track "Full Moon", producer Mike City's only contribution to Full Moon. A piano-dominated up-tempo song with a "lulling drumbeat and heavy bass," Norwood characterized it as urban contemporary, explaining that "Full Moon" is "pop and R&B at the same time [but] has a lot of elements to it." Lyrically, the song deals with a love at first sight during a full moon night. "I Thought", a Jerkins-crafted adamant break-up song about female empowerment, features electro bass lines and crunchy drums. Jerkins described it as an "anthem [and] a flip off" of Brandy's previous single "The Boy Is Mine." "When You Touch Me" is a ballad that revolves around the planning of a rendezvous. Initially conceived by Big Bert, it was significantly polished by Jerkins. Singer-producer Teddy Riley with whom Jerkins worked on Michael Jackson's Invincible (2001) during the creation of Full Moon appears on the talk box segment of the song.

The "hand-clapping, funky" song "Like This" sees Brandy continue to discuss her intimate desires with her lover. On "All in Me", a "futuristically funked-out" song built on keyboards and a sped up breakdown, the singer pleads with her lover to have faith in her, promising him she will provide whatever he needs. Jerkins produced a 2-step groove section for the middle of the song, following a gig in London months before where he was inspired by artists like Craig David and Artful Dodger. "Apart", produced by Keith Crouch, blends neo soul sensibilities, airy pop, and modern R&B with Middle Eastern music. Lyrically, it has the protagnoist lamenting for her partner's attention, resulting in her decision to leave him for the better. "Can We" is a lightweight hip-hop track coated in a batter of futuristic elements on which Brandy requests her partner to clarify their problems, while committing to working through them. "What About Us?" is an offbeat, aggressive high-tech uptempo song, seemingly "set amid a steel factory's sonic churns, whirs and crunches." Brandy described it as "edgy, sexy" and a "little bit ahead of its time." On post-break song "Anybody", another "edgy, eclectic offering," Brandy reminds a lover he is supposed to keep their hurtful relationship a secret.

"It's Not Worth It" finds Brandy trying to hold her relationship together after it has deteriorated to shambles. Initially penned in 1999, Jerkins built the song around Michael Jackson's ad-libbed vocals, resulting from a joint recording session for Jackson's 2001 studio album. "He Is", the next song, is a jazzy love song with "a classy piano and sparse drum track," produced by Warryn Campbell. Speaking about God in third person, Brandy was unaware the song was conceptualized as a gospel song by its writers. "Come a Little Closer" is a soft pop ballad that was originally written for NSYNC's Celebrity (2001) but eventually recorded by Canadian boy band I.D. Titled "Make It Last Forever," it appeared on their debut album Identically Different (2001). "Love Wouldn't Count Me Out" is a "sweeping" hymn that has the singer seeking understanding in the midst of romantic trial, while album closer "Wow" is an upbeat ballad that has Brandy singing about the joy of finally finding the perfect lover over a "sun kissed groove."

== Title and artwork ==
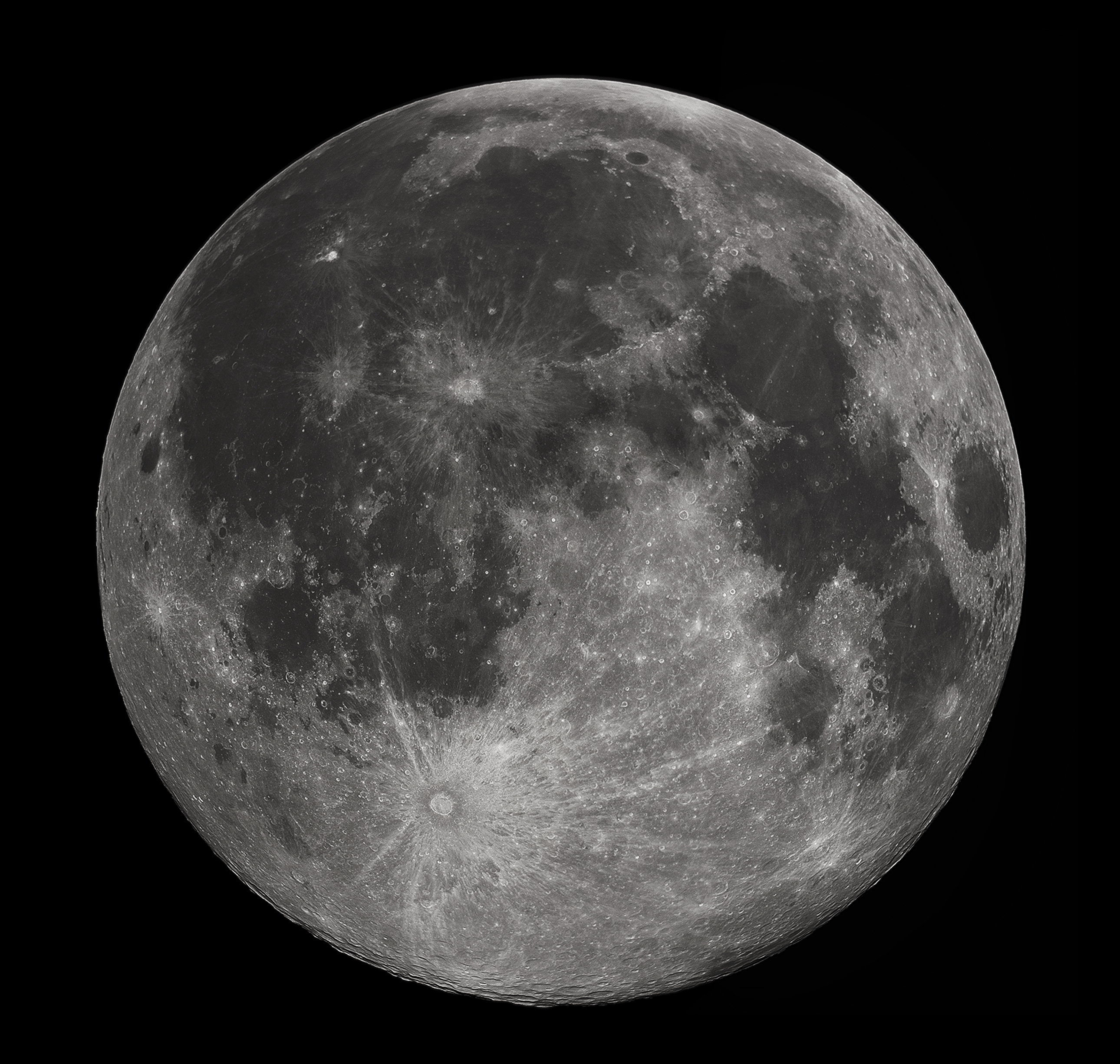
Norwood titled the album of the full moon in honor of its title track and in reference to the previous three years of her life.

In contrast to Jerkins’ predominant influence on the album, Brandy chose to title it Full Moon after her collaboration with City on the track of the same name. Although City was initially told that none of his songs would be included on the record as the tracklist was being finalized, Brandy, anticipating that a title track would not be removed without her consent, took deliberate steps to secure its inclusion, ultimately announcing that the album would bear the song's name to prevent it from being sold to other artists. She felt that while the song "stuck out" and had a "completely different vibe" musically from the rest of the album, "Full Moon" still represented the essence of the record.

Thematically, the title Full Moon, symbolizing the culmination of a cycle, also reflected the preceding three years of Brandy's life. She described the album as a concept work with an autobiographical focus, representing a "complete circle" and her personal and artistic growth during that period. The album's narrative followed the development of a romantic relationship, chronicling her experiences with love, personal challenges, and ultimately finding the partner she truly wanted. Brandy explained that the title not only captured the musical high point of the track itself but also symbolized her own emotional and creative full circle over the preceding three years. Although the album's sound was often described as "futuristic," Brandy stated that this quality emerged incidentally and was not a deliberate guiding principle during the writing or recording process.

The album's cover artwork was photographed by Marc Baptiste. It features Norwood up to just beyond the shoulders, sporting long, "lustrous" straight hair, in addition to "heavy" makeup credited to Rea Ann Silva. Additional photos for the album artwork were taken by Jonathan Mannion at the Los Angeles Ambassador Hotel, as well as frequent collaborator Matthew Rolston.

== Release and promotion ==
Full Moon was originally scheduled for release in the North America on November 20, 2001, but was ultimately delayed until March 5, 2002. In various international markets, the album was issued on slightly different dates and through multiple formats. In Japan, it was released on February 20, 2002 via Warner Music, followed by Germany and the United Kingdom on February 25, 2002, and France on February 26, 2002, via Warner Music. The North American edition of the album included "Die Without You," a duet with Brandy's younger brother Ray-J and a cover of the 1992 song "I'd Die Without You" by American R&B duo P.M. Dawn, as the 17th track on Full Moon. On most international editions, the song was omitted and replaced by the bonus track "Another Day in Paradise," a cover of the 1989 Phil Collins song that Brandy and Ray-J had previously recorded for the Collins tribute album Urban Renewal (2001), which had become a top ten hit across Europe following its March 2001 single release. In Australia and Japan, the tracklist was further expanded with a second bonus track, the beat-driven, hand-clapping song "I Wanna Fall in Love."

The album's promotional tour started in the United Kingdom with live performances of "What About Us?" on CD:UK on February 21 and on Top of the Pops the following day. The promotion continued in Germany with an interview which aired on VIVA Plus in March. Afterwards, the album's release party was held on March 4 in New York City and was attended by celebrities such as Jay-Z, Ananda Lewis, Al Sharpton, Zab Judah, Kid Capri and Bill Duke. Norwood promoted the album in the United States by performing on BET's 106 & Park on March 4, Total Request Live and The Early Show on March 5, Late Night with Conan O'Brien on March 8, Live with Regis and Kelly on March 12, The Oprah Winfrey Show on March 18, and The Tonight Show with Jay Leno on March 28. On April 19, Norwood performed the album's title track on Dick Clark's American Bandstand's 50th Anniversary Celebration, which aired on American Broadcasting Company (ABC) on May 3. Furthermore, she appeared on the covers of Vibe and Honey's April 2002 issues. Promotion for Full Moon slowed considerably shortly before Brandy gave birth to her and Big Bert's daughter, Sy'Rai Smith. The end of her pregnancy and the birth were documented via the four-episode reality television series Brandy: Special Delivery, which aired on MTV from June 18, the series also chronicled events related to the promotion of Full Moon, including the release of its third single "He Is".

=== Singles ===
Full Moon spawned three singles. Lead single "What About Us?" was released on January 2, 2002. (Note: "What About Us?" was made available for streaming on January 2, 2002; it was serviced to rhythmic and urban contemporary radio as Full Moon's lead single on January 18.) It debuted at number 42 on the US Billboard Hot 100 and eventually peaked at number seven, also reaching number three Hot R&B/Hip-Hop Songs. Internationally, the song reached the top ten in Australia, Denmark, New Zealand, Scotland, Switzerland, and the United Kingdom, topping the UK R&B Chart, and was certified gold by the Australian Recording Industry Association (ARIA) for shipments of 35,000 copies. The song's highly animated, futuristic accompanying music video, directed by Dave Meyers, introduced a sexier image of Brandy, portraying her as a male-ruling character in an alternate universe, and was nominated in the Viewer's Choice category at the 2002 MTV Video Music Awards.

The album’s title track, "Full Moon", followed as the second single on April 1, 2002. It debuted at number 68 on the Billboard Hot 100, it peaked at number 18 in its tenth week on the chart, also reaching at number 16 on the Hot R&B/Hip-Hop Songs. In the United Kingdom, the song peaked at numbers 15 and four on the UK Singles Chart and the R&B chart, respectively. Elsewhere, it entered the top 40 in France, Ireland, Italy, Scotland, and the Flemish region of Belgium, though it was notably less successful than "What About Us?". The music video for "Full Moon," directed by Chris Robinson, features a nearly six-months-pregnant Brandy at a nighttime house party, where she meets a man and later rides through Los Angeles under the rising full moon. "Full Moon" received a nomination for R&B/Soul or Rap Song of the Year at the 2003 Soul Train Lady of Soul Awards.

With Brandy heavily pregnant during the album's promotional campaign, much of the promotion was put on hold before pre-planned singles "When You Touch Me" and "I Thought" could be released. Atlantic Records ultimately chose "He Is" as Full Moon's third and final single, which was received as US release on July 29, 2002, a month after she gave birth to Sy'Rai. Prior to her delivery, Atlantic commissioned remixes and additional vocals from Brandy, including an acoustic pop version produced with Guy Roche, which she ultimately chose not to use, questioning its potential as a crossover hit. While critics responded positively to the song, many agreed with her concerns and considered it a weak single choice. "He Is" failed to enter the Billboard Hot 100, peaking at number 78 on the Hot R&B/Hip-Hop Songs.

== Critical reception ==
Professional ratings
Aggregate scores
Source	Rating
Metacritic	60/100
Review scores
Source	Rating
AllMusic	4/5 stars
Entertainment Weekly	A−
The Guardian	3/5 stars
Pitchfork	9.0/10
Q	2/5 stars
The Rolling Stone Album Guide	3.5/5 stars
Slant Magazine	3/5 stars
Uncut	6/10
Sputnikmusic	4.5/5 stars

Full Moon was initially met with generally mixed reviews. At Metacritic, which assigns a normalized rating out of 100 to reviews from mainstream critics, it received an average score of 60 based on ten reviews. In his review for Entertainment Weekly, journalist Craig Seymour gave Full Moon an A− rating, saying that "where [Rodney] Jerkins' herky-jerky stylings come off cold on Jacko's latest, they embolden 23-year-old Brandy as she learns the difference between teen heartbreak and grown-up betrayal, [suggesting] maturity and the high price that often comes with it." Stephen Thomas Erlewine from AllMusic was critical with the album's length of over 70 minutes but considered it Norwood's most assured, risky album yet, stating: "Full Moon comes the closest to being a full-fledged, well-rounded album, as well as establishing a personality as a singer [...] There are plenty of moments here that are seductively smooth and even the filler goes down smoothly." He gave the album four out of five stars.

Slant Magazine writer Sal Cinquemani rated the album three stars out of five and compared it to Janet Jackson's 1986 album Control, commenting: "For the most part, Full Moon is certainly a forward-minded album, lifting Brandy's typically schmaltzy brand of pop-R&B to a new, edgier plateau [...] The all-grown-up Miss Moesha seems to be making her final transition from sitting up in her room to sitting on top of the world." J. Victoria Sanders from PopMatters considered Full Moon "an achievement" and added: "As she proclaims her womanhood with throaty whispers and assertive wails, [...] this grown-up Brandy [...] has one thing in common with the cherubic girl she used to be: she still sings with relaxing humility and style – qualities the music world is in dire need of right about now." Washington Post writer Britt Robson called the album a "refreshingly sexy" record "of honest growth and modest virtues" as well as "of slight refinements and logical maturation". John Aizlewood from The Guardian found that "without Jerkins, Brandy stumbles more easily. At 73 minutes Full Moon is far too flabby, but there's nothing here to derail her."

Billboard praised Full Moon for its ballads and the leading single but was unsatisfied with the album as a whole, stating that "those expecting more from the same [as 'What About Us?'] will be disappointed, it's a fairly paint-by-numbers affair." Similarly, People found that "the rest of Full Moon can't sustain the bizarre brilliance of 'What About Us?'. While much of the CD brandishes a similar edge, with electronic wizardry made for headphone listening, it showcases the producing team more than its singer. Brandy has one of the more distinctive voices around, so it's a shame that she so often gets lost in the beat-heavy mix." Devon Thomas, writer for The Michigan Daily, was generally disappointed with the album. He said that "heavily producer-driven, the album follows the template that catapulted her sophomore album to multi-platinum status. The tradition (or condition) continues on her junior outing, [which] exhibits the same ole Jerkins production we've heard time and time before, just slightly altered (or 'updated') and equipped." Critical with mainstream R&B in general, he further summed: "We know it'll be another hit, another platinum plaque for the Moe-ster, but will this album go down on any 'Best of the Decade' lists? Highly unlikely." Rolling Stone dismissed the album as "frantic, faceless, fake-sexy R&B," while Piers Martin from NME declared it a "velvet-lined bucket of slush." Robert Christgau gave the album a "dud" rating.

== Accolades ==
Year	Award	Category	Nominee(s)	Result	Ref.
2002	MTV Video Music Award	Viewer's Choice	"What About Us?"	Nominated	
2003	Grammy Award	Best Contemporary R&B Album	Full Moon	Nominated	
2003	Soul Train Lady of Soul Award	Best R&B/Soul or Rap Song	"Full Moon"	Nominated	

== Commercial performance ==
In the United States, Full Moon debuted at number two on the Billboard 200 and atop the Top R&B/Hip-Hop Albums in the issue dated March 23, 2002, marking Brandy's highest debuts on both charts. Selling 156,000 copies in its first week, the album fell short of the O Brother, Where Art Thou? soundtrack (2000) by less than 4,000 copies. Spending thirty weeks on the latter chart, the album shifted about 700,000 copies within the first three months of its US release. It also debuted and peaked at number eleven on the US Top Internet Albums. The album was certified platinum by the Recording Industry Association of America (RIAA) on April 5, 2002, and has sold 1.1 million units in the country.

Full Moon peaked at number eight on the Canadian Albums Chart. On July 19, 2002, it was certified gold by Music Canada for shipments of 50,000 copies in the country. In the United Kingdom, the album became Brandy's first top-ten album, debuting and peaking at number nine on the UK Albums Chart with first-week sales shy of 25,000 units. Upon its release, it was immediately certified gold by the British Phonographic Industry (BPI), indicating shipments of 100,000 copies. Full Moon also became Brandy's second album to top the UK R&B Albums Chart. As of 2021 the album has sold 148,000 units in the UK. In Japan, Full Moon debuted at number 15 on the Oricon Albums Chart, becoming her second top-twenty entry on the chart. It was eventually certified gold by the Recording Industry Association of Japan (RIAJ) for shipments of more than 100,000 units. Full Moon also became Brandy's first top-ten entry in Germany and Switzerland, reaching numbers eight and seven, respectively.

== Impact and legacy ==
Retrospective professional reviews
Review scores
Source	Rating
Pitchfork	9.0/10

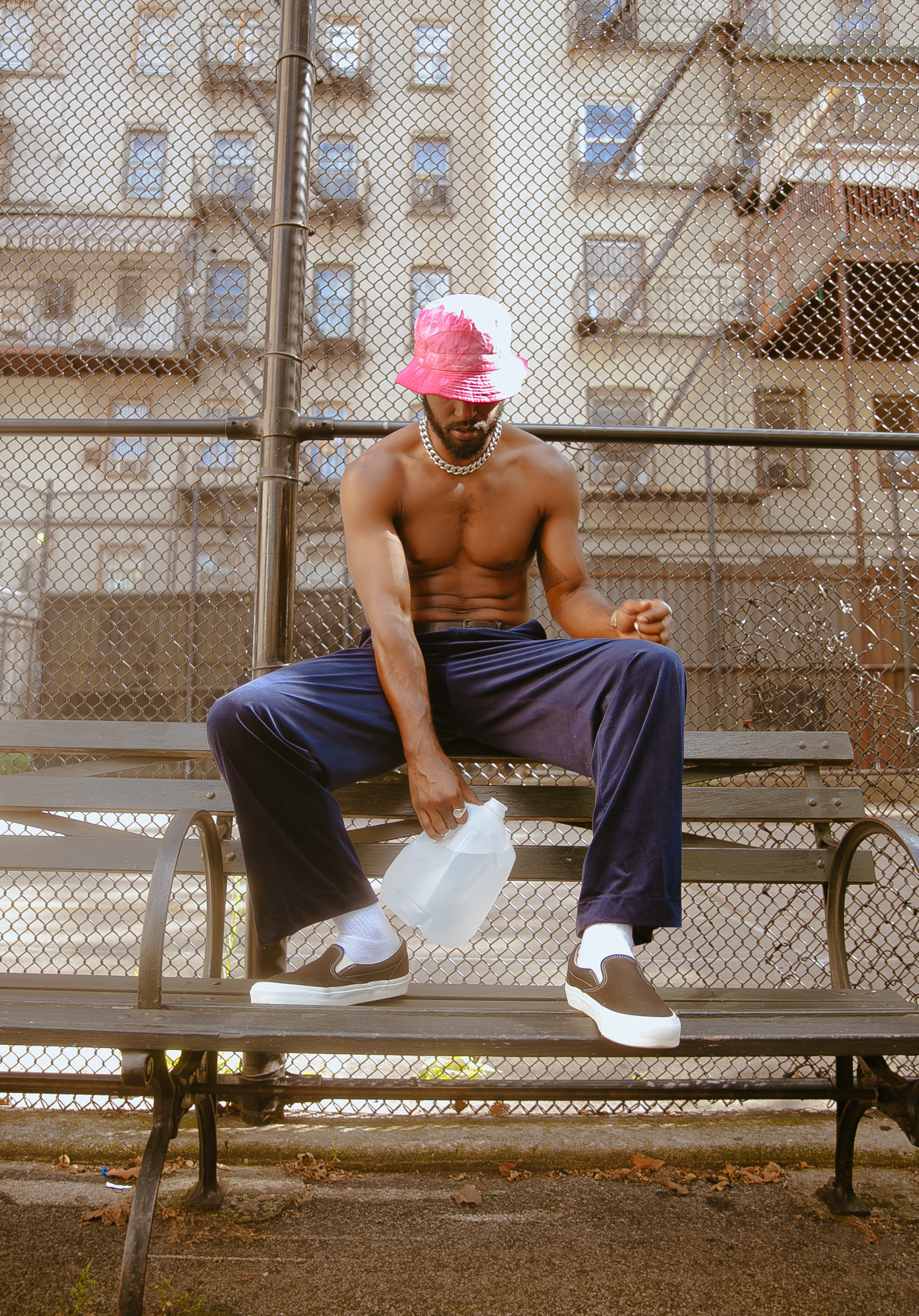
Luke James described the album as the "Bible" of contemporary R&B from the 2000s, calling it "the diagram on how to make vocals."

Since its release, Full Moon has garnered retrospective recognition from musicians, vocalists and music producers, particularly within the R&B and urban contemporary gospel genres. Regarded as "the blueprint of modern R&B," the album is credited with "continuing Norwood's artistic progression and introducing a new facet of herself, destroying the image of a teenager in exchange for that of a grown woman," with Billboard calling it "the one to cement her as an R&B trailblazer" as well as the "gold standard for modern R&B vocalists". Music analyst Khaaliq Crowder wrote in a retrospective review published in blog Leeky Crowder that with Full Moon "Brandy abandoned the old image to successfully present a fully developed new one. She no longer used box braids nor did it carry the image of the girl-next-door, the singer of "Have You Ever?" returned in 2002 with long, sleek straight hair and heavy makeup, adding warm, sultry mannerisms to her music on songs like "Like This" and "Come a Little Closer"."

Musicians such as Ambré, Chris Brown, Jacob Latimore, Lil Mo, Mary Mary, PJ Morton, Keke Palmer, Kierra Sheard, Hope Tala, JoJo, Jazmine Sullivan, and Tank referenced the album and its vocal work as influential. The vocal work on the album sparked the idea of Norwood gaining the subjective nickname "Vocal Bible". Norwood herself has ranked Full Moon among her favorites in her album discography numerous times.

Songwriter Sean Garrett credits the vocal work on the album for his approach to writing, saying "I take a lot from what [Brandy] and Rodney did on the Full Moon album. I was extremely impressed with it and I always try to outdo that album." B.Slade spoke of the album, commenting Full Moon single-handedly changed the vocal game. "It has been the template for vocal choices and background vocal arrangements [for years]." R&B singer Melanie Fiona especially admired the singer's work on that album, dubbing Norwood the "Harmony Queen". Neo soul singer India.Arie often cites the album, particularly the song "He Is" as being the template for a wide array of singers. Canadian R&B singer Keshia Chanté credited the album for inspiring her writing for her album Night & Day, while American singer Luke James referred to Full Moon as the "bible" of 2000s contemporary R&B, calling it the "blueprint of how to do vocals". British soul performer Daley included a cover version of the album cut "When You Touch Me" on his Daley, Unplugged tour; the song was also paid tribute to in gospel form by Sunday Best artist Y'anna Crawley. German pop singer Rüdiger Skoczowsky, who cites Brandy as one of his main vocal inspirations, included a cover of "Love Wouldn't Count Me Out" on some of his live shows.

On February 12, 2025, British singer Jorja Smith and rapper AJ Tracey released the single "Crush", which heavily samples "Love Wouldn't Count Me Out".

== Track listing ==
Full Moon – Standard edition
No.	Title	Writer(s)	Producer(s)	Length
1.	"B Rocka Intro"	LaShawn Daniels; Fred Jerkins III; Rodney Jerkins; Nora Payne; Kenisha Pratt	R. Jerkins; Brandy^{[a]}; Daniels^{[a]}	1:19
2.	"Full Moon"	Mike City	City; Brandy^{[a]}	4:08
3.	"I Thought"	Daniels; F. Jerkins; R. Jerkins	R. Jerkins; Brandy^{[a]}; Daniels^{[a]}	4:29
4.	"When You Touch Me"	R. Jerkins; Payne; Pratt; Robert Smith	R. Jerkins; Big Bert^{[a]}	5:43
5.	"Like This"	Daniels; F. Jerkins; R. Jerkins; Brandy Norwood	R. Jerkins; Brandy^{[a]}; Daniels^{[a]}	4:32
6.	"All in Me"	Daniels; F. Jerkins; R. Jerkins	R. Jerkins; Brandy^{[a]}; Daniels^{[a]}	4:00
7.	"Apart"	Keith Crouch; Pratt	Crouch; Kamillion; Brandy; Daniels^{[a]}	4:27
8.	"Can We"	Daniels; R. Jerkins; Alex Greggs	R. Jerkins; Brandy^{[a]}; Daniels^{[a]}	4:43
9.	"What About Us?"	Daniels; R. Jerkins; B. Norwood; Payne; Pratt	R. Jerkins; Brandy^{[a]}; Daniels^{[a]}	4:10
10.	"Anybody"	Daniels; F. Jerkins; R. Jerkins; B. Norwood; Pratt	R. Jerkins; Brandy^{[a]}; Daniels^{[a]}	4:55
11.	"Nothing"	Daniels; R. Jerkins; Pratt	Uncle Freddie; Brandy^{[a]}; Daniels^{[a]}	4:48
12.	"It's Not Worth It"	Daniels; F. Jerkins; R. Jerkins	R. Jerkins; Brandy^{[a]}; Daniels^{[a]}	4:23
13.	"He Is"	Warryn Campbell; Harold Lilly, Jr.; B. Norwood	Campbell; Brandy	4:21
14.	"Come a Little Closer"	Stuart Brawley; Jason Derlatka	R. Jerkins; Brawley; Derlatka; Brandy^{[a]}; Daniels^{[a]}	4:32
15.	"Love Wouldn't Count Me Out"	Daniels; F. Jerkins; S. Johnson; B. Norwood	R. Jerkins; Brandy^{[a]}; Daniels^{[a]}	4:19
16.	"WOW"	Daniels; B. Norwood; Payne; Pratt; Smith	Big Bert; Brandy; Daniels^{[a]}	4:13
Total length:				69:02

Full Moon – North American edition
No.	Title	Writer(s)	Producer(s)	Length
17.	"Die Without You" (with Ray J)	Attrell Cordes	Big Bert; Brandy^{[a]}; Daniels^{[a]}	3:56
Total length:				72:58

Full Moon – International edition (bonus track)
No.	Title	Writer(s)	Producer(s)	Length
17.	"Another Day in Paradise" (with Ray J)	Phil Collins	Guy Roche	4:32
Total length:				73:34

Full Moon – International digital edition (bonus track)
No.	Title	Writer(s)	Producer(s)	Length
18.	"Full Moon" (Cutfather & Joe Remix)	City	City; Brandy^{[a]}; Cutfather & Joe^{[b]}	4:08
Total length:				77:42

Full Moon – US limited edition, Australian/Japanese editions (bonus track)
No.	Title	Writer(s)	Producer(s)	Length
18.	"I Wanna Fall in Love"	Daniels; R. Jerkins; B. Norwood; Pratt	R. Jerkins; Brandy^{[a]}; Daniels^{[a]}	3:49
Total length:				76:47

Notes

- ^{^[a]} signifies a vocal producer
- ^{^[b]} signifies an additional producer
- Although only on North American editions of Full Moon, "Die Without You" is not signified as a bonus track.

== Personnel ==
Credits adapted from the liner notes of Full Moon.

- J.D. Andrew – assistant engineer
- Lori Andrews – strings
- Marc Baptiste – photography
- Jim Bottari – engineer
- Stuart Brawley – engineer
- Thomas Bricker – design, art director
- David Campbell – string arrangements, conducting
- Tom Coyne – mastering
- Reginald Dozier – engineer
- Jan Fairchild – engineer
- Andrew Feigenbaum – A&R
- Aaron Fishbein – guitar
- Jon Gass – mixing
- Brad Gilderman – mixing
- Larry Gold – cello
- Edward Green – strings
- Kenneth B. Hertz – assistant engineer
- Gerald Heyward – drums
- Michael Huff – assistant engineer
- Michael Jackson – vocal assistance
- Rodney Jerkins – executive producer
- Jubu – guitar
- Craig Kallman – executive producer, A&R
- Suzie Katayama – conductor
- Lila Kazakova – strings
- Kimbo – violin
- Thor Laewe – engineer
- Marc Stephen Lee – assistant engineer
- Manny Marroquin – mixing
- Eugene Mechtovich – strings
- Patrick Morgan – strings
- Michele Nardone – strings
- Brandy Norwood – executive producer, vocal producer, A&R
- Dave Pensado – mixing
- Isaac Phillips – guitar
- Ray-J – vocal assistance
- Michael "Wolf" Reaves – engineer
- Steve Robillard – assistant engineer
- Robin Ross – strings
- Ron Shapiro – executive producer
- Dexter Simmons – mixing
- Marston Smith – strings
- Thomas Tally – strings
- Joe Lewis Thomas – vocal assistance
- Javier Valverde – assistant engineer
- Charles Veal, Jr. – strings
- Zheng Wang – strings
- Joe "Flip" Wilson – piano
- Tibor Zelig – strings
- Yihuaw Zhao – strings

== Charts ==
=== Weekly charts ===
Weekly chart performance for Full Moon
Chart (2002)	Peak position
Australian Albums (ARIA)	13
Australian Urban Albums (ARIA)	2
Austrian Albums (Ö3 Austria)	54
Belgian Albums (Ultratop Flanders)	26
Belgian Albums (Ultratop Wallonia)	28
Canadian Albums (Billboard)	8
Canadian R&B Albums (Nielsen SoundScan)	4
Danish Albums (Hitlisten)	26
Dutch Albums (Album Top 100)	23
European Top 100 Albums (Music & Media)	9
French Albums (SNEP)	12
German Albums (Offizielle Top 100)	8
Irish Albums (IRMA)	14
Japanese Albums (Oricon)	15
New Zealand Albums (RMNZ)	14
Norwegian Albums (VG-lista)	24
Scottish Albums (Official Charts)	21
Swedish Albums (Sverigetopplistan)	20
Swiss Albums (Schweizer Hitparade)	7
UK Albums (Official Charts)	9
UK R&B Albums (Official Charts)	1
US Billboard 200	2
US Top R&B/Hip-Hop Albums (Billboard)	1

=== Year-end charts ===
Year-end chart performance for Full Moon
Chart (2002)	Position
Canadian Albums (Nielsen SoundScan)	109
Canadian R&B Albums (Nielsen SoundScan)	21
French Albums (SNEP)	143
UK Albums (OCC)	187
US Billboard 200	72
US Top R&B/Hip-Hop Albums (Billboard)	31

== Certifications ==
Certifications for Full Moon
Region	Certification	Certified units/sales
Canada (Music Canada)	Gold	50,000^{^}
Japan (RIAJ)	Gold	100,000^{^}
United Kingdom (BPI)	Gold	148,000
United States (RIAA)	Platinum	1,100,000
^{^} Shipments figures based on certification alone.

== Release history ==
Release dates and formats for Full Moon
Region	Date	Format(s)	Label(s)	Ref.
Japan	February 20, 2002	CD	Warner Music	
Germany	February 25, 2002	CD	Warner Music	
United Kingdom	February 25, 2002	CD	Atlantic	
France	February 26, 2002	CD	Warner Music	
Canada	March 5, 2002	CD	Warner Music	
United States	March 5, 2002	CD	Atlantic	

== See also ==
- Album era
- List of Billboard number-one R&B albums of 2002
- List of UK R&B Albums Chart number ones of 2002

== Bibliography ==
- Brackett, Nathan; Hoard, Christian David (2004). The New Rolling Stone Album Guide. Simon & Schuster. p. 102. ISBN 9780743201698 – via Internet Archive.
