= He Is =

He Is may refer to:

- He Is (Brandy song), 2002
- He Is (Ghost song), 2015
