= Brandy: Special Delivery =

- Opening title sequence
- Also known as: MTV Diary Presents Brandy: Special Delivery
- Genre: Reality
- Starring: Brandy; Robert "Big Bert" Smith; Sonja Norwood; Willie Norwood; Ray J
- Theme music composer: Brandy; Rodney Jerkins; Fred Jerkins III; Japhe Tejeda; LaShawn Daniels
- Opening theme: "Happy" performed by Brandy
- Country of origin: United States
- Original language: English
- No. of seasons: 1
- No. of episodes: 4 (list of episodes)

Production
- Executive producers: Stephanie Chambers; Dan Murphy
- Producer: Ann Meek
- Cinematography: Alex Pappas
- Editors: Joe Botana; Greg Nash; Brian Ray
- Camera setup: Multi-camera
- Running time: 22–24 minutes
- Production company: MTV Networks

Original release
- Network: MTV
- Release: June 18 – July 9, 2002

Brandy: Special Delivery is an American reality series following R&B singer Brandy's pregnancy with baby Sy'rai. The series aired on MTV. The premiere episode premiered in the United States and Germany on June 18, 2002, with Canada following on June 21, where it took The Osbournes TV slot on Tuesdays 10:30 pm. The show eventually spawned four episodes.

== Production history ==
Originally only planned to be a regular Diary episode, MTV felt the material was interesting and entertaining enough to sustain a five-episode-series.

Before the series even aired, it drew comparisons to The Osbournes which Special Delivery would replace. MTV denied any similarities stating, "The show really has nothing to do with The Osbournes".

== Cast ==
=== Main cast ===
- Brandy – R&B singer and actress
- Robert "Big Bert" Smith – Brandy's boyfriend and producer
- Sonja Norwood – Brandy's mother and manager
- Ray J – Brandy's brother (episodes 2 & 4)
- Willie Norwood – Brandy's father (episodes 2 & 4)

=== Secondary cast ===
- Sy'rai Iman Smith – Brandy's daughter (episode 4)
- Drano – a manager and the baby's godfather (episodes 1 & 3)
- Dick Clark – TV-host (episode 1)
- Wanda Dennis – parent mentor (episodes 1 & 2)
- Jackie Maser – Brandy's interior decorator (episodes 1 & 3)
- Mike City – producer of the song "Full Moon" (episode 3)
- Dr. Felicia Ota – Brandy's doctor (episode 3 & 4)
- Darien Davis – Brandy's photographer (episode 3)
- Grace Holmes – Brandy and Robert's midwife (episodes 3 & 4)

== Music ==
During the show the viewers get to hear several of Brandy's songs from her current and her previous albums. The following lists every song played during the show. (in the order of being played)

Episode 1

- "Happy" (theme song)
- "Top of the World" (featuring Ma$e)
- "One Voice"
- "He Is" (being recorded)
- "Come a Little Bit Closer"
- "U Don't Know Me (Like U Used To)"
- "Sunny Day"
- "Love Wouldn't Count Me Out"

Episode 2

- "Happy" (theme song)
- "What About Us?"
- "Top of the World" (featuring Ma$e)
- "U Don't Know Me (Like U Used To)"
- "Best Friend"
- "Full Moon"
- "Give Me You"
- "Baby"
- "Almost Doesn't Count"
- "I Wanna Be Down
- "Always on My Mind"
- "B-Rock Intro"
- "Come a Little Bit Closer"

Episode 3

- "Happy" (theme song)
- "Top of the World" (featuring Ma$e)
- "U Don't Know Me (Like U Used To)" (Remix featuring Shaunta & Da Brat)
- "Tomorrow"

Episode 4

- "Who's That Girl?" (by Eve)
- "The Boy Is Mine"
- "Low Rider"
- "He Is"
- "U Don't Know Me (Like U Used To)"
- "Rock the Boat" (by Aaliyah)
- "What It Is" (by Busta Rhymes featuring Kelis)
