= Full Moon (Brandy song) =

2002 single by Brandy

Single by Brandy

from the album Full Moon
- Released: April 1, 2002
- Studio: Record Plant (Los Angeles)
- Length: 3:31 (radio edit); 3:58 (album version)
- Label: Atlantic
- Songwriter: Mike City
- Producer: Mike City

Brandy singles chronology
"What About Us?" (2002)	"Full Moon" (2002)	"He Is" (2002)

Music video
- "Full Moon" on YouTube

"Full Moon" is a song recorded by American singer Brandy for her third studio album of the same title (2002). A breakaway from Rodney Jerkins' dominating influence on the album, it was written and produced by Mike City, one of the few producers Norwood worked with on Full Moon apart from Jerkins and his production and songwriting crew. Described by Norwood as "ghetto", the track is an R&B and pop song with a simple, piano-led production. Lyrically, "Full Moon" follows Norwood as she experiences love at first sight in a nightclub, whose circumstances she attributes to a full moon night.

The song was released as the album's second single on April 1, 2002, by Atlantic Records. It was well-received by music critics, with many complimenting Norwood's voice as well as the bass-heavy production, calling it a standout track from the album. In January 2024, Rolling Stone ranked it as the tenth Best R&B Song of the 21st century. A moderate commercial success, "Full Moon" peaked at number 18 on the US Billboard Hot 100 and at number 15 on the UK Singles Chart.

The accompanying music video for "Full Moon", directed by Chris Robinson, features Norwood telescoping at night. As the video progresses, she attends a house party where she meets a man with whom she is eventually riding off through Los Angeles, watching the rising full moon. Norwood was nearly six months pregnant at the time of the filming. "Full Moon" was included on set lists of the Human World Tour (2009) and the Slayana World Tour (2016), and has been performed live by Norwood during several televised events.

== Background and development ==
After the end of the promotional tour for her second studio album Never Say Never (1998), the cancellation of her UPN sitcom Moesha (1996–2001), and a flurry of tabloid headlines discussing her nervous breakdown in November 1999, Norwood took a lengthy hiatus from her musical career to reflect. In mid-2000, she re-dedicated herself to her musical career, contributing songs to albums such as Urban Renewal (2001), which introduced a scratchy, evocative edge to Norwood's voice, now having a deeper and warmer tone with a textured lower register and notably stronger falsetto.

In fall 2000, Norwood finally began conceiving ideas for a third studio album with her label Atlantic Records. While Rodney Jerkins, the main producer of her previous album, and his team had been working on several new songs for her then-upcoming project in hopes of recreating the winning chemistry of Never Say Never, Norwood wanted to make sure that she was gaining more creative control over the project, thus arranging meetings with all her writers and musicians to discuss the lyrical topics and sounds she wanted for the album.

== Writing and production ==
While Jerkins maintained his status as the executive producer of Full Moon, contributing most to its track listing with his team, Norwood decided to record with several producers for the album, including the head of Unsung Entertainment Mike City, with whom she had previously worked on the song "Open" for the soundtrack of the animated comedy film Osmosis Jones (2001). According to City, he wrote "Full Moon" in "two or three weeks, writing a line a day".

Although Norwood and City crafted several more songs, they were insecure about "Full Moon" being included on the final track listing since it differentiated stylistically from what she had recorded before. "I'm glad it did because it really showed where I was coming from musically and vocally [...] and I could relate to the lyrics of the song", Brandy said the following year in an interview with MTV News, adding: "It took him a while to understand my crazy ideas, but [...] he really challenged himself. If you listen to it, it's different from what he's already done in the past [...]".

== Music and lyrics ==
Norwood has characterized "Full Moon" as "ghetto", explaining that it is "pop and R&B at the same time [and] has a lot of elements to it". Lyrically, the song deals with the circumstances of an unexpected love at first sight. Norwood stated: "Anything can happen on a full moon. On that particular [song], I'm actually falling in love with somebody I'm just meeting", adding: "I hope that's the second single, because it's different. I've never heard anything like it."

== Release ==
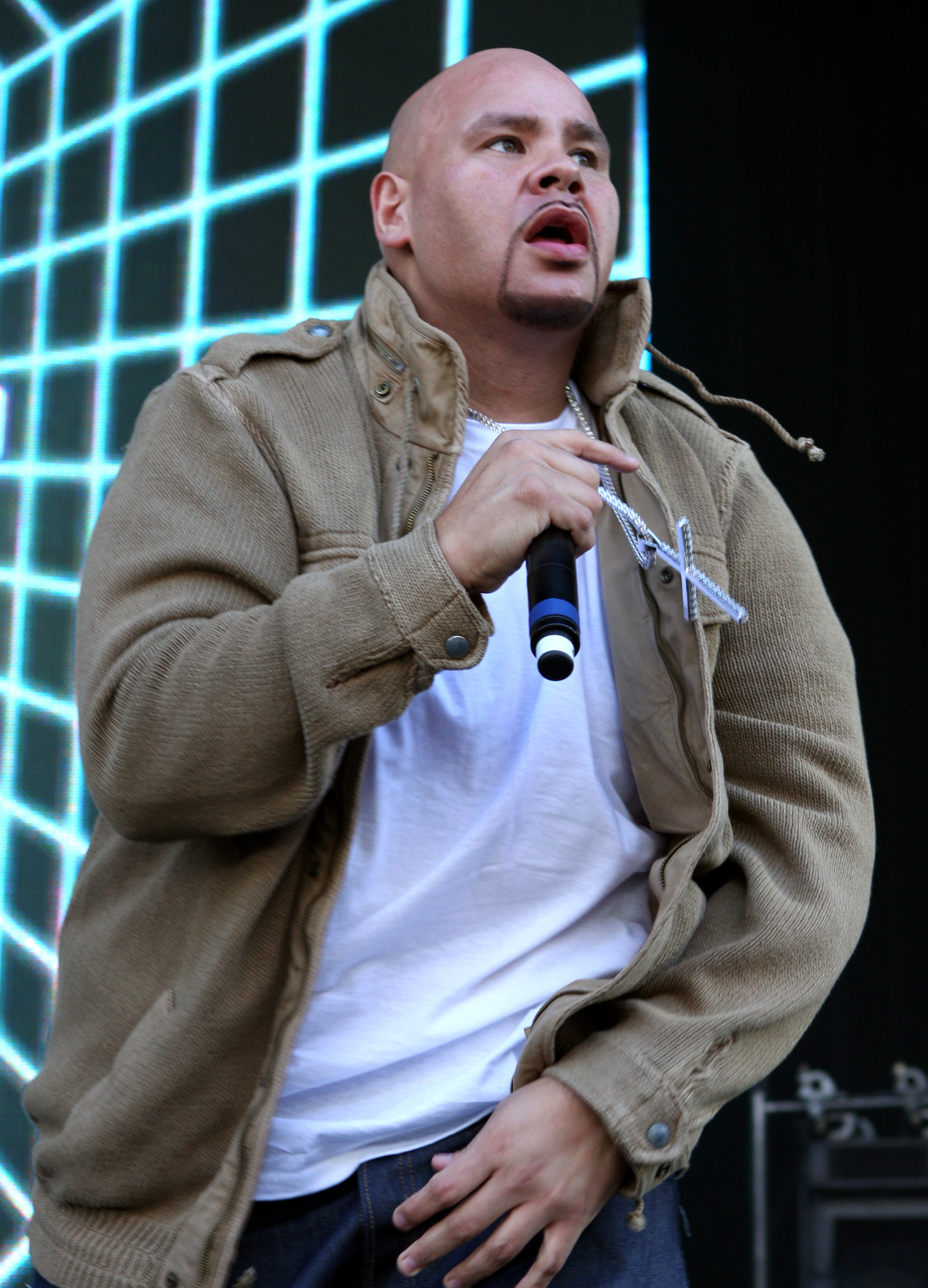
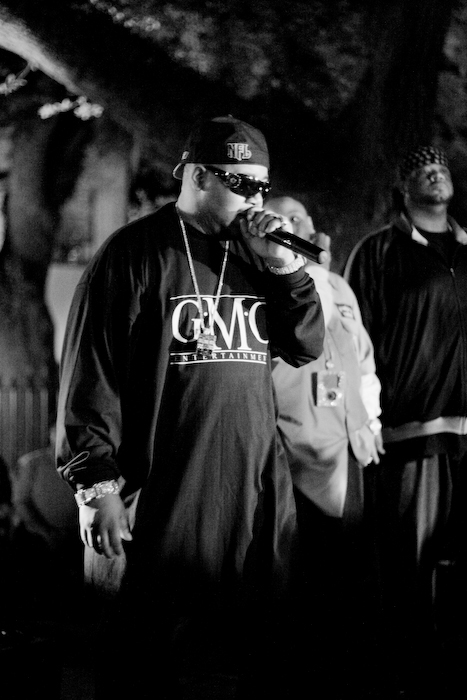
Rappers Fat Joe (left) and Twista appeared on individual remixes of the song, which were both produced by Glen Marchese.

"Full Moon" was released as the second single from Full Moon by Atlantic Records. It was added to rhythmic contemporary and urban radio stations in the United States on April 1, 2002. The song was released as a CD single–including "Die Without You", a cover version of P.M. Dawn's 1992 single "I'd Die Without You", featuring Norwood's younger brother Ray J, and remixes of "What About Us?"–as well as 12-inch and limited maxi CD singles. In addition, "Full Moon" was remixed by several producers and DJs. Rappers Fat Joe and Twista both appeared on separate versions of the Precision Remix, which was crafted by Glen Marchese. Danish production duo Cutfather & Joe produced a remix laying Brandy's vocals over the electro–funk song "I.O.U." (1983) by British band Freeez, while Gorillaz' collaborator Soulchild utilized American singer Michael Wycoff's "Lookin' Up to You". Producer Damien Mendis reworked the song entirely around the basis of the disco song "I Want Your Love" (1979) by Chic.

== Critical reception ==
Upon its release, "Full Moon" garnered widespread critical acclaim. Sal Cinquemani from Slant Magazine felt that Norwood afforded "the tired love at first sight genre new life" on the song. He complimented it for its "hypnotic oscillating bassline and a chorus catchy enough to make the track the next summer anthem". Chuck Taylor of Billboard noted that the song portrayed "how a few years off have allowed [Norwood] to evolve and grow" and called it "another hit destined for the R&B and pop saturation". He found that "the best part of the song is in the verses, which Brandy delivers with a rich, bassy sensuality" while he declared the chorus as "sing-songy and on the repetitious side, but multiple layers of creamy harmonies help it rise above the mundane". Music Week called the song "a perfect slice of R&B-lite with a fine hook line". They also felt that it should emulate the chart success of "What About Us?", and help "refocus interest on the album, as well as scoring in its own right". J. Victoria Sanders from PopMatters called the record "a club-ready song, with a lulling drumbeat and heavy bass". She further added that "her voice on this song, like many of the others, is slightly computerized without sounding overdone". AllMusic's Stephen Thomas Erlewine ranked the song among his favorites from Full Moon alongside "What About Us?" and "He Is".

=== Rankings ===
Select rankings
Publication	List	Rank	Ref.
Rolling Stone	The 100 Greatest R&B Songs of the 21st Century	10	

== Commercial performance ==
For the week ending May 4, 2002, "Full Moon" entered the US Billboard Hot 100 at number 68, becoming Norwood's 13th entry on the chart. The song peaked at number 18 after ten weeks on the chart, on the issue dated July 6, 2002, becoming Norwood's second single from Full Moon to enter the top 20. "Full Moon" fared slightly better on the US Hot R&B/Hip-Hop Songs, where it debuted at number 38 the week ending April 15, 2002, becoming the highest debut on the chart that year. Norwood's 12th top-20 entry, it eventually reached number 16 in the week of June 8, 2002. In addition, the song reached number 11 on the Rhythmic chart, number 15 on the R&B/Hip-Hop Airplay chart and number 20 on the Mainstream Top 40. The dance mixes reached number two on the Hot Dance Music/Maxi-Singles Sales. The final international single from Full Moon, "Full Moon" entered the top 40 in the Belgian region Wallonia, France, Ireland, Italy, Scotland and the United Kingdom, but failed to match the success of its predecessor "What About Us?".

== Music video ==
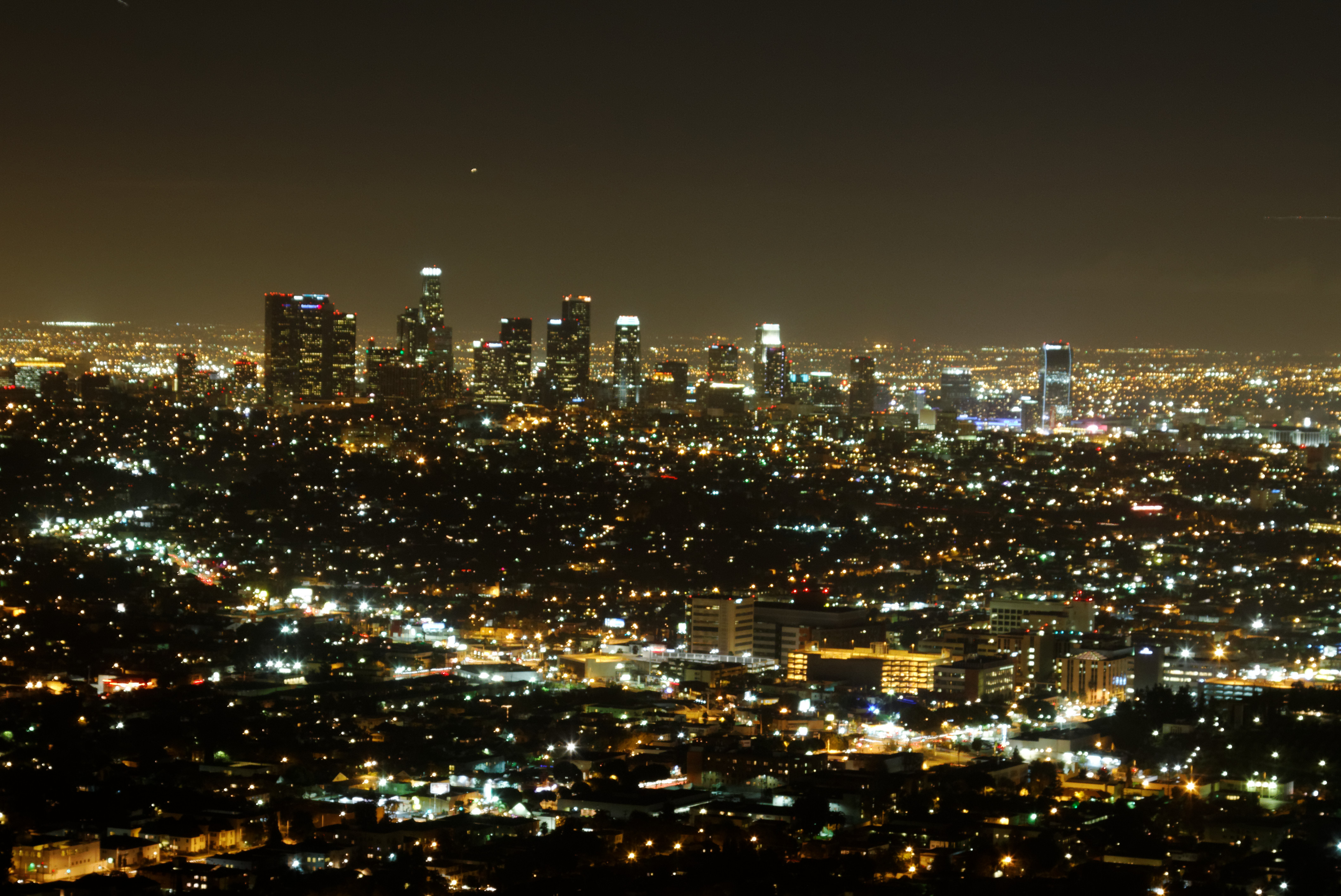
The music video for "Full Moon" was filmed in various locations throughout Los Angeles.

A music video for "Full Moon" was directed by Chris Robinson and filmed on various locations throughout Los Angeles, California on March 1–2, 2002. Norwood, who was nearly six months pregnant at the time of the video shoot, does not dance in the video, which features model and Moesha actor Yoki Brown as her male counterpart. The final edit premiered on MTV's music video chart program Total Request Live on April 3, 2002, where it debuted at number ten and reached number one. It stayed on the show for forty-three days.

The video opens with Norwood stargazing through a telescope on her Los Angeles balcony at a full moon night. Through the instrument she turns her attention to someone's house party a few miles away, where she spots a longhaired male, portrayed by Brown, among the guests. She changes clothes and then rides through the hillside along the coast in her silver cabriolet. Once she has arrived, Norwood enters the shindig in hopes of meeting him. This serves as the catalyst for a distant flirt between her and Brown that continues as the song plays. During the bridge, he follows her back into the car. In the end, they stop by a viewpoint, watching the sinking full moon.

== Legacy ==
On March 25, 2020, Vibe named "Full Moon" Norwood's seventh best song. The same year, Grant Rindner from Oprah Daily included it in his Brandy's 20 Best Songs listing and noted: "The hook is one of her most creative, with staccato vocal runs stacked atop harmonic swells." In 2022, Spin magazine ranked the song 30th in its list of The 50 Best Songs of 2002. In her commentary, editor Jaelani Turner-Williams wrote: "Equally grown up, "Full Moon" solidified Brandy as "the Vocal Bible," her deep tone fluttering and trilling over Mike City’s bouncy, piano-driven production."

In 2023, In celebration of Black Music Month, R&B singer Coco Jones performed a special live rendition of "Full Moon" for Revolt's The Link Up. In 2024, Rolling Stone ranked the song at number ten on their list of The 100 Greatest R&B Songs of the 21st Century, writing: "The trope of meeting in the club and locking eyes across the dance floor is R&B’s super glue, but Brandy fortifies it as she gets trapped in an orbit of lunar infatuation."

== Track listings ==
Enhanced maxi single

1. "Full Moon" (Radio Edit) – 3:31
2. "Full Moon" (Cutfather & Joe Remix) – 3:52^{[C]}
3. "Full Moon" (Ernie Lake Radio Edit) – 3:37
4. "Die Without You" (featuring Ray-J) – 3:56
5. "What About Us?" (Simon Vegas Remix) – 3:58
6. "What About Us?" (Enhanced Video) – 4:08

UK CD single

1. "Full Moon" (Radio Mix) – 3:35
2. "Full Moon" (Album Version) – 3:37
3. "Full Moon" (Full Intention Club Mix) – 6:56
4. "Full Moon" (Enhanced Video)

US CD single

1. "Full Moon" (Radio Mix)
2. "Full Moon" (Album Version)
3. "Full Moon" (Full Intention Club Mix)
4. "Full Moon" (Video)

US remix single

1. "Full Moon" (Damien Mendis Remix) – 3:56^{[A]}
2. "Full Moon" (Precision Remix featuring Fat Joe) – 4:24
3. "Full Moon" (Precision Remix featuring Twista) – 4:23
4. "Full Moon" (Soulchild Remix) – 3:59^{[B]}
5. "Full Moon" (Cutfather & Joe Remix) – 3:56^{[C]}
6. "Full Moon" (Full Intention Club Mix) – 6:56
7. "Full Moon" (Ernie Lake Club Mix) – 7:01
8. "Full Moon" (Filur Vs. Cutfather & Joe Mix) – 6:55^{[C]}
9. "Full Moon" (Robbie Rivera Freeze Mix) – 6:37^{[C]}
10. "Full Moon" (Mike Rizzo Global Club Mix) – 7:54
11. "Full Moon" (Rascal Extended Mix) – 6:29^{[A]}
12. "Full Moon" (Rascal Dub) – 6:02^{[A]}

Limited UK 12

1. "Full Moon" (Mad Skillz Mix)
2. "Full Moon" (Mad Skillz Dub)

Sample credits

- (A) contains a sample of "I Want Your Love" by Chic.
- (B) contains excerpts from the composition "Lookin' Up to You" by Michael Wycoff.
- (C) incorporates a sample of "I.O.U." by Freeez.

== Charts ==
=== Weekly charts ===
Weekly chart performance for "Full Moon"
Chart (2002)	Peak position
Australia (ARIA)	43
Australian Urban (ARIA)	14
Belgium (Ultratop 50 Flanders)	46
Belgium (Ultratop 50 Wallonia)	33
Europe (Eurochart Hot 100)	46
Europe (European Dance Traxx)	39
Europe (European Radio Top 50)	21
France (SNEP)	27
Germany (GfK)	54
Ireland (IRMA)	38
Italy (FIMI)	33
Netherlands (Dutch Top 40 Tipparade)	2
Netherlands (Single Top 100)	51
Romania (Romanian Top 100)	45
Scotland Singles (Official Charts)	35
Sweden (Sverigetopplistan)	53
Switzerland (Schweizer Hitparade)	72
UK Singles (Official Charts)	15
UK Hip Hop/R&B (Official Charts)	4
US Billboard Hot 100	18
US Dance Singles Sales (Billboard)	2
US Hot R&B/Hip-Hop Songs (Billboard)	16
US Pop Airplay (Billboard)	20
US Rhythmic Airplay (Billboard)	11
US Top 40 Tracks (Billboard)	23

=== Year-end charts ===
Year-end chart performance for "Full Moon"
Chart (2002)	Position
UK Singles (OCC)	187
UK Urban (Music Week)	19
US Billboard Hot 100	89
US Hot R&B/Hip-Hop Singles & Tracks (Billboard)	69
US Mainstream Top 40 (Billboard)	97
US Maxi-Singles Sales (Billboard)	21
US Rhythmic Top 40 (Billboard)	57

== Release history ==
Release dates and formats for "Full Moon"
Region	Date	Format(s)	Label(s)	Ref.
United States	April 1, 2002	Rhythmic contemporary radio; urban contemporary radio	Atlantic	
United States	April 22, 2002	Contemporary hit radio	Atlantic	
Australia	May 13, 2002	Maxi CD	Warner Music	
Germany	June 3, 2002	CD	Warner Music	
United Kingdom	June 17, 2002	12-inch vinyl; maxi CD	Atlantic	
France	July 23, 2002	CD	East West	
France	July 30, 2002	Maxi CD	East West	
France	August 20, 2002	12-inch vinyl	East West	
United States	August 27, 2002	12-inch vinyl; maxi CD	Atlantic	
