= Tripolism =

Danish electronic music trio

- Origin: Denmark
- Genres: Electronic
- Works: Loveless (EP, 2021); Metalodisko (EP, 2021); Resistance (EP, 2021); Absolute Dope (2024, Ultra Records)
- Years active: 2021–present
- Label: Ultra Records
- Members: Bryn (Brynjar Bjarnfoss); Fred (Frederik Tangaa Thorngaard); Ras (Rasmus Rask Vendelbjerg)
- Website: www.tripolism.dance

Tripolism is a Danish electronic music trio, consisting of producers Fred, Bryn, and Ras.

== Background ==
Tripolism consists of three vocalists and producers: Bryn (Brynjar Bjarnfoss), Fred (Frederik Tangaa Thorngaard), and Ras (Rasmus Rask Vendelbjerg).

Bryn grew up in Reykjavík, Iceland, until the age of nine, before moving to Farum, Denmark. Ras and Fred are from Holstebro, Denmark. Bryn began experimenting with music production at age eleven using the software Dance eJay. Ras and Fred developed an early interest in electronic music and organized underground parties, through which they later met Bryn in the Copenhagen DJ scene.

== Career ==
Tripolism began gaining attention in 2021 with releases on labels such as Out of Options, Metrica, Just This, and Balance Music.

Tripolism signed to Ultra Records in 2023, and released their breakthrough debut single "Dope Dance" in August of that year. Two months later, they followed with the critically acclaimed single "Luna Love," a collaboration with Berlin-based artist Rosa Lee Luna. In January 2024, they released "Whatever We Call It," their third single on Ultra Records. Each of these singles was named a BBC Radio 1 Essential New Tune by Pete Tong.

In June 2024, Tripolism released their debut album Absolute Dope through Ultra Records, after which the group's profile grew significantly. The ten-track project included songs such as "Soultrain", "Ras in France", and "Good Times". Mixmag described it as "blending Tripolism's signature Nordic-noir elements with fresh, innovative sounds," and characterized the record as a significant step in the group's career, presenting a sound both familiar and progressive and balancing festival-ready energy with club intimacy.

In January 2025, Tripolism released "Nuraan," a collaboration with Danish producer and longtime collaborator Nandu. The single drew on Middle Eastern influences while maintaining their characteristic blend of house and techno. In February, they issued a remix of "Lola's Theme" by The Shapeshifters via Defected Record's Glitterbox imprint, which reached number one on Beatport. In May, they collaborated with Danish pop band WhoMadeWho on "Flying Away With You," released on Cercle Records.

Tripolism have performed at venues including DC-10's Circoloco, Klein Phonix, and Pacha's Saga series, and were part of the lineups of Tomorrowland and Denmark's Spot Festival in 2025. In April 2025, they made their U.S. debut at Coachella.

Tripolism's music, which features vocals, incorporates elements of house, disco, and techno.

== Discography ==
=== Albums and EPs ===
- Loveless (EP, 2021)
- Metalodisko (EP, 2021)
- Resistance (EP, 2021)
- Absolute Dope (2024, Ultra Records)

=== Selected singles ===
- "Dope Dance" (2023, Ultra Records)
- "Luna Love" (2023, Ultra Records)
- "Whatever We Call It" (2024, Ultra Records)
- "Move On" (2024, Ultra Records)
- "Nuraan" (2025, with Nandu, Ultra Records)
- "Sunrise" (2025, with Nandu, Ultra Records)
- "Groove On" (2025, Ultra Records)
- "Flying Away With You" (2025, with WhoMadeWho, Cercle Records)
- "Keep Hope Alive" (2025, Ultra Records)

=== Remixes ===
- The Shapeshifters - "Lola's Theme" (2024, Defected Records)
