= List of UK R&B Albums Chart number ones of 2002 =

The logo of the Official Charts Company, responsible for compiling all of the official music charts in the United Kingdom, including the R&B albums chart.

The UK R&B Chart is a weekly chart, first introduced in October 1994, that ranks the 40 biggest-selling singles and albums that are classified in the R&B genre in the United Kingdom. The chart is compiled by the Official Charts Company, and is based on sales of CDs, downloads, vinyl and other formats over the previous seven days.

The following are the number-one albums of 2002.

== Number-one albums ==
Issue date	Album	Artist(s)	Record label	Ref.
6 January	Dreams Can Come True, Greatest Hits Vol. 1	Gabrielle	PolyGram	
13 January	Pain Is Love	Ja Rule	Murder Inc./Def Jam	
20 January	Pain Is Love	Ja Rule	Murder Inc./Def Jam	
27 January	Aaliyah	Aaliyah	Blackground/Virgin	
3 February	Pain Is Love	Ja Rule	Murder Inc./Def Jam	
10 February	Pain Is Love	Ja Rule	Murder Inc./Def Jam	
17 February	Legacy: The Greatest Hits Collection	Boyz II Men	Universal	
24 February	Legacy: The Greatest Hits Collection	Boyz II Men	Universal	
3 March	Full Moon	Brandy	Atlantic	
10 March	Legacy: The Greatest Hits Collection	Boyz II Men	Universal	
17 March	Who I Am	Beverley Knight	Parlophone	
24 March	J to tha L–O! The Remixes	Jennifer Lopez	Epic	
31 March	J to tha L–O! The Remixes	Jennifer Lopez	Epic	
7 April	J to tha L–O! The Remixes	Jennifer Lopez	Epic	
14 April	J to tha L–O! The Remixes	Jennifer Lopez	Epic	
21 April	J to tha L–O! The Remixes	Jennifer Lopez	Epic	
28 April	J to tha L–O! The Remixes	Jennifer Lopez	Epic	
5 May	J to tha L–O! The Remixes	Jennifer Lopez	Epic	
12 May	No More Drama	Mary J. Blige	MCA	
19 May	No More Drama	Mary J. Blige	MCA	
26 May	No More Drama	Mary J. Blige	MCA	
2 June	The Eminem Show	Eminem	Aftermath/Interscope/Shady	
9 June	The Eminem Show	Eminem	Aftermath/Interscope/Shady	
16 June	The Eminem Show	Eminem	Aftermath/Interscope/Shady	
23 June	The Eminem Show	Eminem	Aftermath/Interscope/Shady	
30 June	The Eminem Show	Eminem	Aftermath/Interscope/Shady	
7 July	Nellyville	Nelly	Universal/Fo' Real/The Inc.	
14 July	Nellyville	Nelly	Universal/Fo' Real/The Inc.	
21 July	Ashanti	Ashanti	Murder Inc./Def Jam	
28 July	Ashanti	Ashanti	Murder Inc./Def Jam	
4 August	Ashanti	Ashanti	Murder Inc./Def Jam	
11 August	The Very Best of Pure R&B - The Summer	Various Artists	BMG/Telstar TV	
18 August	The Very Best of Pure R&B - The Summer	Various Artists	BMG/Telstar TV	
25 August	The Very Best of Pure R&B - The Summer	Various Artists	BMG/Telstar TV	
1 September	The Very Best of Pure R&B - The Summer	Various Artists	BMG/Telstar TV	
8 September	The Very Best of Pure R&B - The Summer	Various Artists	BMG/Telstar TV	
15 September	Missundaztood	Pink	Arista	
22 September	Westwood - Vol. 3	Various Artists	Def Jam	
29 September	Nellyville	Nelly	Universal/Fo' Real/The Inc.	
6 October	Nellyville	Nelly	Universal/Fo' Real/The Inc.	
13 October	Nellyville	Nelly	Universal/Fo' Real/The Inc.	
20 October	Nellyville	Nelly	Universal/Fo' Real/The Inc.	
27 October	Nellyville	Nelly	Universal/Fo' Real/The Inc.	
3 November	Nellyville	Nelly	Universal/Fo' Real/The Inc.	
10 November	Justified	Justin Timberlake	Jive	
17 November	Slicker Than Your Average	Craig David	Atlantic	
24 November	Missundaztood	Pink	Arista	
1 December	Missundaztood	Pink	Arista	
8 December	Missundaztood	Pink	Arista	
15 December	Missundaztood	Pink	Arista	
22 December	Missundaztood	Pink	Arista	
29 December	Missundaztood	Pink	Arista	

== See also ==
- List of UK Albums Chart number ones of the 2010s
