= Tomas Barfod =

Danish drummer and music producer

- Origin: Copenhagen, Denmark
- Genre: Electronic
- Label: Secretly Canadian
- Formerly of: Filur, WhoMadeWho
- Website: web.archive.org/web/20171224133709/secretlycanadian.com/artist/?name=barfodtomas

Tomas Barfod is a Danish drummer and electronic music producer. He currently spends his time between Los Angeles and Copenhagen. While in LA, he works as a producer and currently has tracks on several albums.

== Biography ==
Barfod began playing drums when he was ten years old, and has been producing as a DJ since the 1990s. He began playing with Kasper Bjorke as the duo Filur in 1999, and in 2003 founded the group WhoMadeWho with Jeppe Kjellberg and Tomas Høfting. Barfod is the drummer for WhoMadeWho. Concurrently, he has released music under his own name, including two full-length albums which were released in 2012 and 2014. His labels include Secretly Canadian, Kompakt, FOF music, and Get Physical.

== Discography ==
=== Albums ===
- Salton Sea (Friends of Friends, 2012)
- Love Me (Secretly Canadian, 2014)
- Glory (Friends of Friends, 2015)
- Paloma (Friends of Friends, 2017)
