= WhoMadeWho =

Danish experimental pop band

Background information
- Origin: Copenhagen, Denmark
- Genres: Electronic, Melodic house
- Years active: 2003-present
- Label: Maison Arts
- Members: Jeppe Kjellberg; Tomas Barfod; Tomas Høffding
- Website: Official website

WhoMadeWho is a Danish electronic music trio formed in Copenhagen in 2003. The band consists of singer and guitarist Jeppe Kjellberg, drummer and producer Tomas Barfod, and singer and bassist Tomas Høffding.

== Career ==
WhoMadeWho formed in Copenhagen in 2003, combining house and electronic music with live instrumentation. The trio released several 12-inch records through German label Gomma Records before releasing their self-titled debut album, WhoMadeWho, in 2005. This was followed by The Plot (2009), Knee Deep (2011), Brighter (2012), Dreams (2014), Through the Walls (2018), Synchronicity (2020), UUUU (2022), and Kiss & Forget (2024). In 2026, WhoMadeWho released ENERGY with Gordo through the label Maison Arts.

As a live act, WhoMadeWho have performed alongside artists including Daft Punk, Soulwax, Hot Chip, Justice and LCD Soundsystem. Their performances combine electronic production with live instrumentation and visual elements.

In 2007, WhoMadeWho headlined the Benicàssim festival after Klaxons arrived too late to perform. In February 2014, they performed "Cuccurucucu" with Arisa at the Festival of Sanremo 2014, as a tribute to Franco Battiato.

In February 2021, WhoMadeWho performed a live-streamed concert for Cercle at the Abu Simbel in Egypt. In September 2022, they launched their album UUUU at Koko in London.

The band performed at Coachella in 2023 and 2026 and at Estéreo Picnic in 2024. Their subsequent festival appearances included Sónar, Cercle Odyssey, Tecate Pa'l Norte, Só Track Boa and Tomorrowland Winter.

WhoMadeWho also developed The Moment, a community-driven series of curated events combining intimate performances and shared dinners with participation from friends, family, artists and collaborators. Events have been held in locations including Egypt, Lisbon, London, New York City, Apulia, Ibiza, Mexico City, São Paulo, and Morocco.

In 2025, Vogue Scandinavia profiled WhoMadeWho and The Moment, describing the group's music as instrument-led electronic music and The Moment as a festival founded by the band.

In July 2026, WhoMadeWho collaborated with Italian fashion retailer Antonioli on a capsule collection comprising three football T-shirts designed for the collaboration.

== Discography ==
=== Studio albums ===
- WhoMadeWho (2005)
- The Plot (2009)
- Knee Deep (2011)
- Brighter (2012)
- Dreams (2014)
- Through the Walls (2018)
- Synchronicity (2020)
- UUUU (2022)
- Kiss & Forget (2024)

=== EPs ===
- Ember (2015)
- Obstacle (2020)
- Synchronicity III (2020)

=== Selected singles ===
- "Miracle" (2023)
- "Love Will Save Me" (2024)
- "Kiss Me Hard" (2024)
- "All The Love" (2025)
- "Flying Away With You" (2025)
- "Mind Off" (2025)
- "ENERGY" (2026)

=== Other releases ===
WhoMadeWho released several early singles, 12-inch records, remix releases and compilations, including Happy Girl and Two Covers for Your Party (2004), The Loop and Space for Rent (2005), Out the Door and Green Version (2006), TV Friend (2008), The Plot / The Train, The Plot Remixes, Keep Me in My Plane and The Remix Collection (2009), and Live at Abu Simbel (2021).

=== Selected remixes ===
- Hot Chip – "TV Friend"
- DJ Koze – "Keep Me in My Plane"
- The Rapture & Dirt Crew – "Space for Rent"
- Superdiscount – "Out the Door"
- Tale of Us & Michael Mayer – "Every Minute Alone"
- Maceo Plex – "Heads Above"
- Rüfüs Du Sol – "Miracle"
- Mind Against & Dyzen – "Children"
- CamelPhat & Marten Lou – "Love Will Save Me"
- Adam Ten – "Kiss Me Hard"

=== Collaborations ===
As of 2026, WhoMadeWho have collaborated with artists including Adriatique, Rüfüs Du Sol, Gordo, Carlita, Tripolism, Kölsch, Rampa, RY X and Alex Wann.

== See also ==
- Filur
