= Filur =

Danish electronic music duo

- Origin: Denmark
- Genres: EDM
- Years active: 1999–present
- Members: Tomas Barfod; Kasper Bjørke

Filur is a Danish electronic dance music duo established in 1999, consisting of producer Tomas Barfod and vocalist Kasper Bjørke. They also feature many guest artists on their releases.

== History ==
Filur has released four albums and many successful singles. They are best known for the hit "I Want You", which was the 4th most played Danish song outside of Denmark in 2005.

They were also popular in Italy, where in 2001 they had charting hits "It's alright" and "Shame", both credited to "Filur meets Miss Nellie Ettison".

The duo has toured extensively in the United States, Europe and Japan. They had a special album release, Peace, for the Japanese market.

The band has won two DMA awards for "Best Producers" and "Best Dance Album".

Barfod has been involved with the group WhoMadeWho, whereas Bjørke has concentrated on his solo work and producing for other artists.

== Discography ==
=== Albums ===
Year	Title	Peak position	Certification	Track list
Year	Title	DK	Certification	Track list
2001	Exciting Comfort	38		1. "Platypus Groove" (3:21); 2. "It's Alright" (feat. Miss Nellie Ettison) (3:50); 3. "Stay Tuff" (3:43); 4. "Drop" (feat. Malou, Susanne) (4:26); 5. "Part of Life" (feat. Erann DD) (4:07); 6. "Masters of Rhythm" (4:31); 7. "Shame" (feat. Miss Nellie Ettison) (3:58); 8. "Feel for You" (feat. Miss Nellie Ettison) (5:14); 9. "Two Pinatas, Please" (2:05); 10. "It's Alright (Allstar Mix)" (6:20); 11. "Property" (4:56); 12. "King of the Bear" (feat. DJ Noize) (2:59); 13. "Godfather of the Game" (feat. Ilawy) (4:19); 14. "Sunset Boulevard" (feat. Katja Kean) (3:36); 15. "Crowdpusher (Puddu Varano Mix)" (3:53)
2002	Deeply Superficial	–		1. "Closer" (feat. Nellie Ettison) (7:07); 2. "Release" (5:16); 3. "Fallin'" (feat. Kai Martin) (4:45); 4. "P.I.E.C.E" (feat. Nellie Ettison) (5:19); 5. "You & I" (feat. Pernille Rosendahl) (6:54); 6. "CPH / NY" (3:55); 7. "Without" (feat. Magnum Coltrane Price) (5:55); 8. "Liquid Fantasy" (3:55); 9. "Everything" (feat. Michelle Matlock) (5:08); 10. "I Want You" (feat. Magnum Coltrane Price) (5:25); 11. "Joy" (feat. Miss Kinck) (6:09); 12. "Outro" (1:14)
2006	Into the Wasteland	–		1. "Into The Wasteland" (feat. Stina Nordenstam) (4:21); 2. "Pretty Little Things" (4:45); 3. "Avoid Disgrace" (feat. Dominique Keegan) (4:49); 4. "Kid Retouch" (3:20); 5. "Transfusion" (feat. Blake) (3:26); 6. "The Con" (feat. Josephine Philip) (3:50); 7. "Faster!" (1:59); 8. "Ahead of Time" (feat. Aura) (5:29); 9. "What I Long" (feat. Josephine Philip) (3:16); 10. "Right Said Frog" (2:19); 11. "Fred Astaire" (feat. Tanja Thulau & Hess Is More) (5:25); 12. "Boredom Threshold" (Filur vs. Buda) (4:34); 13. "The Con" (video by William Stahl) (4:42); 14. "The Con (Alternate Unreleased Version) (video by William Stahl) (4:13)
2011	Faces	23		1. "Shadow Boxing" (feat Nabiha) (4:30); 2. "Glow" (feat. Vinnie Who) (4:10); 3. "Concentrate!" (feat. Simon Kvamm) (3:34); 4. "Welding Love" (feat. Daniel Agust) (4:10); 5. "The Bell" (feat Liv Lykke) (5:14); 6. "Live and Learn" (feat. Matt Kolstrup) (4:06); 7. "The Maze" (feat. Sascha Perera) (3:49); 8. "Tired" (feat. Josephine Winding) (5:17); 9. "Pyamo" (Filur vs. Breum) (5:20)

Limited editions

- 2003: Peace (only released in Japan)

=== Singles ===
Year	Song	Peak		Certification	Album
Year	Song	DK	ITA	Certification	Album
2001	"I Want You" (Filur meets Magnum Coltrane Price)	11	—		Deeply Superficial
2001	"It's Alright" (Filur meets Nellie Ettison)	—	49		Exciting Comfort
2001	"Shame" (Filur meets Nellie Ettison)	—	53		Exciting Comfort
2006	"The Con"	12	—		Into the Wasteland
2011	"Concentrate!" (Filur feat. Simon Kvamm)	19	—		Faces
