= He Is (Brandy song) =

Single by Brandy

from the album Full Moon
- Released: July 29, 2002
- Studio: Record Plant (Los Angeles, CA); Hartman Way Sounds (West Hills, CA); O'Henry Sound Studios (North Hollywood, CA)
- Length: 4:21 (album version); 4:09 (radio remix)
- Label: Atlantic
- Songwriters: Brandy Norwood; Warryn Campbell; Harold Lilly
- Producers: Warryn Campbell; Brandy

Brandy singles chronology
"Full Moon" (2002)	"He Is" (2002)	"Talk About Our Love" (2004)

Audio video
- "He Is" on YouTube

"He Is" is a song recorded by American singer Brandy for her third studio album Full Moon (2002). It was written by Warryn Campbell, Harold Lilly and Brandy, with production handled by Campbell and the latter. Conceived during spiritual discussions with the singer, Campbell and Lilly conceptualized the pop and R&B-influenced ballad secretly as a gospel song, as they were keen to hear her sing a religious track, a genre which Brandy declined to record at the time. Lyrically speaking about God in third person, she was unaware "He Is" was not a relationship-themed song when she recorded it.

"He Is" was released by Atlantic Records as the third and final single from Full Moon in the United States on July 29, 2002. It received mostly positive reviews from music critics, many of whom applauded Norwood's vocal performance and the sparse production, but dismissed the song as a weak single choice. Likewise, the track failed to reprise the success of the album's previous singles "What About Us?" and "Full Moon"; while it failed to chart on the US Billboard Hot 100, it reached number 78 on the Hot R&B/Hip-Hop Songs.

== Background and development ==
After the end of the promotional tour for her second studio album Never Say Never (1998), the cancellation of her UPN sitcom Moesha (1996–2001), and a flurry of tabloid headlines discussing her nervous breakdown in November 1999, Norwood went on a lengthy hiatus to reflect and take some introspective looks. In mid-2000, she started reconsecrating herself on her musical career, contributing songs to albums such as Urban Renewal (2001), which introduced a scratchy, evocative edge to Norwood's voice, now having a deeper and warmer tone with a textured lower register and notably stronger falsetto.

In fall 2000, Norwood finally began conceiving ideas for a third studio album with her label Atlantic Records. While Rodney Jerkins, the main producer of her previous album, and his team had been working on several new songs for her then-upcoming project in hopes of recreating the winning chemistry of Never Say Never, Norwood wanted to make sure that she was gaining more creative control over the project, thus arranging meetings with all her writers and musicians to discuss the lyrical topics and sounds she wanted for the album.

== Writing and recording ==
Producer Warryn Campbell met then-15-year-old Brandy when he started playing keyboards in her live band. Though he left the band two years later to pursue a career in music production, the pair reunited in 2001 along with songwriter Harold Lilly to collaborate on her third studio album Full Moon. During the first month they worked together, Campbell, Lilly, and Brandy discussed spirituality. Brandy, who was raised in a Christian household, read a lot of religious and spiritual texts as that time, but while conversations prompted Campbell to ask her to record a gospel song, she declined.

Determined to get her to sing a gospel song, Campbell and Lilly went on to craft a song which would speak discreetly about God in third person. Though Brandy later joined the couple for additional writing on the track, Campbell and Lilly kept the initial meaning of the song a secret until its single release. In an interview with Yahoo! Music in August 2002, Campbell revealed: "I've never told [Norwood]. She still don't know. She thinks it's about birth. And I wanted her to sing it like it's about birth. That gave it that push. She has probably figured it out by now." In 2022, Campbell revealed that fellow R&B singer Deborah Cox wanted to record the song at first.

== Critical reception ==
In his review for Billboard, editor Chuck Taylor wrote that "the slow jam offers a sensual groove, with the sparse production leaving ample room for a vocal spotlight". He felt that the track prioritized style over melody, and "the simple chorus – using only three notes – does not include much of a hook. The cut certainly makes for good music, fitting for quiet-storm shows, but as a single, it would have a hard time standing out on radio." His Billboard colleague Michael Paoletta called "He Is" one "of the most shining moments" on Full Moon. Jet magazine found that the "sensuous sound" of "He Is" was evidence of Norwood's musical growth with the album. Similarly, Vibe found that the song was a vessel for a "a wide range of emotions" on Full Moon, with "a more matured voice shining" on "He Is". AllMusic's Stephen Thomas Erlewine ranked the song among his three favorites from Full Moon, along with the title track and "What About Us?".

== Release and performance ==
"He Is" was selected as the third single from Full Moon by Atlantic Records in 2002. In support of its single release, Atlantic commissioned remixes of the song, with the recording of additional ad-libs tracked by Brandy: Special Delivery (2002), a MTV reality series that followed Brandy's 2002 pregnancy with baby Sy'rai. Brandy also worked with Guy Roche, producer of her 1998 song "Almost Doesn't Count," on an acoustic guitar-led pop version with entirely new vocals. Underwhelmed with the outcome, she initially questioned whether to release "He Is" as the single at all, since she felt it was not modifiable into a crossover hit. Calling the product of the recording session "real shit", Brandy left Roche's version unused.

The album version of "He Is" was serviced to rhythmic contemporary radio in the United States on September 17, 2002. While it received no international release, its US release was accompanied by a promotional CD single, which included two slightly shorter radio remixes produced by Campbell. Further remixes, produced by Mike Rizzo, Joe Bermudez, and Maurice Joshua, were also issued individually. "He Is" debuted at number 78 on the US Hot R&B/Hip-Hop Songs chart in the week of September 7, 2002 and peaked at number 72 three weeks later.

== Track listing ==
US promo CD single
No.	Title	Length
1.	"He Is" (album version)	4:21
2.	"He Is" (radio remix 1)	4:09
3.	"He Is" (radio remix 2)	4:09

== Credits and personnel ==
Credits are adapted from the liner notes of Full Moon.

- Sandra Campbell – project coordination
- Warryn Campbell – instrumentation, production, vocal arrangement, vocal production, writing
- Reggie Dozier – engineering
- Jan Fairchild – engineering
- Thor Laewe – engineering
- Harold Lilly – writing
- Manny Marroquin – mixing
- Brandy Norwood – vocals, production, vocal arrangement, vocal production, writing
- Rebeka Tuinei – mixing assistance
- Benjamin F. Wright, Jr. – string arrangement

== Charts ==
Weekly chart performance for "He Is"
Chart (2002)	Peak position
US Hot R&B/Hip-Hop Songs (Billboard)	72
US Urban (Radio & Records)	41

== Release history ==
Release dates and formats for "He Is"
Region	Date	Format(s)	Label(s)	Ref.
United States	July 29, 2002	Urban contemporary radio	Atlantic	
United States	September 17, 2002	Rhythmic contemporary radio	Atlantic	
