= What About Us? (Brandy song) =

2002 single by Brandy

Single by Brandy

from the album Full Moon
- Released: January 1, 2002
- Studio: Hit Factory Criteria (Miami, Florida)
- Genre: Electro-funk
- Length: 4:10
- Label: Atlantic
- Songwriters: LaShawn Daniels; Rodney Jerkins; Brandy Norwood; Nora Payne; Kenisha Pratt
- Producer: Rodney Jerkins

Brandy singles chronology
"Another Day in Paradise" (2001)	"What About Us?" (2002)	"Full Moon" (2002)

Music video
- "What About Us?" on YouTube

"What About Us?" is a song by American singer Brandy from her third studio album, Full Moon (2002). It was written by LaShawn Daniels, Rodney Jerkins, Kenisha Pratt, Nora Payne and Brandy, featuring main production by Jerkins. An offbeat, aggressive high-tech track, the song's development was motivated by the fact that the singer wanted something different–an aggressive, sexier and edgier sound with a message which would empower women while also reflecting her own growth and maturity.

"What About Us?" was released as the lead single from Full Moon on January 1, 2002, by Atlantic Records. A commercial success, it peaked at number seven on the US Billboard Hot 100, also reaching the top ten in Australia, Denmark, New Zealand, Norway, and the United Kingdom. Steve "Silk" Hurley's remix of the song received a nomination for Best Remixed Recording, Non-Classical at the 45th Annual Grammy Awards (2003).

The accompanying music video for "What About Us?" was directed by Dave Meyers and was filmed in Culver City, California in December 2001. It premiered via MTV on January 10, 2002. Primarily shot in front of a greenscreen, the highly-animated, futuristic video introduced a sexier image of the former teen singer, portraying her as a male-ruling character in an alternate universe. It was nominated for the Viewer's Choice Award at the 2002 MTV Video Music Awards.

== Background and development ==
After the end of the promotional tour for her second studio album Never Say Never (1998), the end of her UPN sitcom Moesha (1996–2001) and a flurry of tabloid headlines discussing her nervous breakdown in November 1999, Brandy went on a lengthy hiatus for personal reflection. In mid-2000, she re-dedicated herself to her musical career, contributing songs to albums such as Urban Renewal (2001), which introduced a scratchy, evocative edge to Brandy's voice, now having a deeper and warmer tone with a textured lower register and notably stronger falsetto. In late 2000, Brandy finally began conceiving ideas for a third studio album with her label Atlantic Records. While Rodney Jerkins, the main producer of her previous album, and his team, had been working on several new songs for the singer's upcoming project in hopes of recreating the winning chemistry of Never Say Never, Brandy wanted to make sure that she was gaining more creative control over the project and thus, arranged meetings with all her writers and musicians to discuss the lyricals topics and sounds she wanted for the album.

== Recording and production ==
"What About Us?" was one of a couple of new tracks Jerkins worked on while he was putting the finishing touches on Full Moon in Los Angeles. After playing it to her, enthusiastic Brandy asked Jerkins to save the "offbeat, aggressive high-tech track" for the album: "I was like 'Oh my God, Rodney, this is it", she said in an interview with MTV News the following year. "This is exactly what the industry needs. We can maybe change the game with this.' He said, 'Yeah, this is what I'm going for'." She eventually consulted longtime collaborators LaShawn Daniels, Nora Payne and Kenisha Pratt to rewrite several lyrics on the song, saying: "I told them what I wanted to talk about. 'This is an aggressive record – it's edgy, it's sexy. I wanna sing about something that's sexy and edgy.' I revisited my past in my mind and kind of told them what I wanna talk about."

Brandy has noted that it took the team a while to get it because she didn't want "that sound that's already saturated the industry. It's important to me to be a trendsetter and change the game. It was a great feeling to see Rodney soar like that." Brandy co-wrote the lyrics with Daniels, Payne and Pratt, also setting the background track. The song was mixed by Paul Foley and Fabian Marascuillo at Darkchild Studios in Pleasantville, New Jersey, while Brandy recorded the song at the Hit Factory Criteria in Miami.

== Music and lyrics ==
An electro-funk song, "What About Us?", was described as being "offbeat", due to its production which features a "chopping pace and snarky sound effects mugging in the background". The song is four minutes and ten seconds long and includes 12 instruments: Brandy's vocals, six different synths, two percussions and drums. According to the notes published on Musicnotes.com by Alfred Publishing, "What About Us?" features 96 beats per minute, which is a moderate tempo. It was written in C minor and ranges from the note C _{2} to Ab ^{4}. In the book Musical Rhythm in the Age of Digital Reproduction (2010), author Anne Danielsen analyzed "What About Us?", describing it as "very complex" and characterized by its multilinear texture and unstable groove.

Lyrically, the song features a protagonist describing the aftermaths of an untrue love, confronting her former lover with the current point of the one-sided attachment. "It was about being in a relationship that's not working anymore", Brandy said in 2005, adding that it "was a little more aggressive and different for me. I'd say it was a little bit ahead of its time..."

== Release ==
AOL Music hosted the exclusive global premiere of "What About Us?", starting January 2, 2002. The full song with a special recorded introduction from Brandy was first made available for streaming on demand on the AOL service First Listen, across AOL's Web Properties including Netscape, AIM, ICQ and CompuServe, as well as on its international services in Argentina, Australia, Brazil, Canada, France, Germany, Japan, Mexico, and the United Kingdom. The song was streamed over 750,000 times in one day.

"What About Us?" was remixed by several producers and DJs, also spawning respective versions with rappers Nas and Joe Budden. The Simon Vegas Remix was played on radios and television instead of the original version in some countries, including Austria, Germany and Switzerland.

== Critical reception ==
"What About Us?" received a mixed to positive response from music critics, who complimented its production and compared it to Janet Jackson's "Control" (1986), which Brandy has cited as an influence on the song. Chuck Taylor from Billboard felt the track was "so striking [that] it's destined to one of those marked hate-it-or-love-it songs". While he criticized Brandy's "generic voice" over the track, he commended the complex but instant structure of the song, writing that "certainly, this is an effective way to let the world know that this charmer has returned and it's destined to be a monster at radio." James Poletti from Dotmusic called the song "disorientating brilliance" and felt that it was "Jerkins' most radical production for some time". Sal Cinquemani from Slant Magazine wrote that the song was "lifting Brandy's typically schmaltzy brand of pop-R&B to a new, edgier plateau [...] With offbeat "What About Us," an assessment of post-break-up collateral damage, [producer] Rodney Jerkins dresses up his signature bass-heavy production in gritty, oft-sadistic outfits." In his album review of Full Moon, Arion Berger declared "What About Us?" the "bright spot" on the album, "with its awkward, chopping pace and snarky sound effects mugging in the background".

Music Week felt that "this Rodney Jerkins production attempts to imitate Timbaland but does not quite pull it off." NME writer Peter Robinson praised "What About Us?" and wrote: "Brandy’s been off the scene for a while but 'What About Us?' rattles her back to life with the force and devastation of a tortoise being plucked from the airing cupboard and set on fire: this rocks hard, it's the tippest of the top, it gets better with every single listen, and it might well be Rodney's best work since 'Say My Name'." Somewhat critical of the song, his colleague Piers Martin found that it was "a slippery, twitching slab of computer funk that thrusts Brandy, fleetingly, into the 21st century", while Devon Thomas from The Michigan Daily called it "guaranteed mainstream club play". AllMusic's Stephen Thomas Erlewine ranked the song among his three favorite tracks from Full Moon along with the title track and "He Is".

== Accolades ==
Awards and nominations for "What About Us?"
Year	Award	Category	Result	Ref.
2002	MTV Video Music Award	Viewer's Choice	Nominated	
2003	Grammy Award	Best Remixed Recording, Non-Classical	Nominated	
2003	BMI Urban Award	Award-Winning Song	Won	

== Commercial performance ==
"What About Us?" debuted at number 42 on the US Billboard Hot 100 on January 26, 2002. It was the "Hot Shot Debut" of the week and marked both Brandy's first entry of the decade and her first appearance on the chart since "U Don't Know Me (Like U Used To)" (1999). The song peaked at number seven, becoming Brandy's seventh top-10 single and staying on the chart for 18 weeks; it remained the chart's highest debut of 2002. On the Hot R&B/Hip-Hop Singles & Tracks chart, the song debuted at number 44. It eventually peaked at number three, becoming her highest-charting song since "Have You Ever?" (1998). In addition, "What About Us?" peaked within the top five on the Rhythmic Top 40 chart and the top 20 on both the Mainstream Top 40 and Top 40 Tracks charts.

== Music video ==
The song's music video was directed by Dave Meyers and produced by Ron Mohrhoff. It was entirely filmed at the Ten 9 Fifty Studios in Culver City, California on November 29–30, 2001, and features close shots and dance sequences using greenscreen technique. The video does not have a substantial plot but focuses on capturing Brandy's "moments as a performer," dealing with "different set-ups" and "beauty, fashion, edginess, hip." To that end, she added in an interview with MTV, it speaks for all girls who've been wronged by selfish, evil lovers. "The hurt and the pain songs really, really work," she observed, articulating the pain of "women, from 15, or 13 on up [...] they have crushes and they get hurt." The video was all about "showing the world a new side of me," she added.

The video for "What About Us?" saw Brandy abandon her teenage appeal for a more adult and sensual edginess.

Set in a science fiction world, the video opens with a digitized long shot of Brandy standing atop a pyramid of kneeling, taut men, which PopMatters described as appearing like the "tragically punished human in Greek mythology", all holding up Brandy on her pedestal. The camera closes on her, and depicts Brandy placing mementos of her now-dead relationship in a chest, including a promise written on parchment, a watch on a chain, a teddy bear. From here, the scene switches into a futuristic wind tunnel, where she wields a bat against cell phones, two-way pagers, and a flying male, whose sunglasses she grabs off. While the video intercuts scenes of Brandy performing on a platform with two black-painted men in collars and leashes, it ends with her sitting in the passenger's seat in a lowrider, amid a sea of lowriders. The final scenes feature cameo appearances by Rodney Jerkins and Brandy's younger brother Ray J.

The final edit of "What About Us?" world premiered at the end of its Making the Video episode on MTV on January 10, 2002. It debuted on the network's Total Request Live top ten video countdown on January 25. The video entered the MuchMusic Countdown in Canada in the week ending February 8, and it peaked at number seven in the week ending February 22. The video generally received mixed reviews from critics, who called it "a surprisingly hard, ostensibly angry, and not very adventurous video" and compared it to Brandy's Matrix-influenced remix video for U Don't Know Me (Like U Used To)". It was nominated for the Viewer's Choice Award at the 2002 MTV Video Music Awards but lost to Michelle Branch's video for "Everywhere".

== Track listings ==
US 7-inch single

A. "What About Us?" (radio mix) – 3:56
B. "Full Moon" (album version) – 4:08

US 12-inch single

A1. "What About Us?" (LP mix) – 4:12
A2. "What About Us?" (instrumental) – 4:09
B1. "What About Us?" (radio mix) – 3:56
B2. "What About Us?" (acapella) – 4:12

UK CD single

1. "What About Us?" (radio version) – 3:56
2. "What About Us?" (album version) – 4:12
3. "What About Us?" (instrumental) – 4:09
4. "What About Us?" (video)

UK 12-inch single

A1. "What About Us?" (radio mix) – 3:56
A2. "What About Us?" (LP mix) – 4:12
B1. "What About Us?" (instrumental) – 4:09
B2. "What About Us?" (acapella) – 4:12

UK cassette single

1. "What About Us?" (radio version) – 3:56
2. "What About Us?" (album version) – 4:12
3. "What About Us?" (instrumental) – 4:09

European CD single

1. "What About Us?" (radio version) – 3:59
2. "What About Us?" (Boogiesoul Remix) – 3:57

Australian CD single

1. "What About Us?" (radio mix)
2. "What About Us?" (Boogiesoul remix)
3. "What About Us?" (Simon Vegas remix)
4. "What About Us?" (instrumental)
5. "What About Us?" (Boogiesoul remix instrumental)
6. "What About Us?" (Simon Vegas remix instrumental)

== Personnel ==
Personnel are adapted from the liner notes of Full Moon.

- LaShawn Daniels – vocal production, writing
- Paul Foley – additional pro-tool editing, engineering
- Alex Greggs – digital effects, pro-tool editing
- Rodney "Darkchild" Jerkins – production, writing
- Marc Lee – engineering assistance
- Fabian Marascuillo – additional pro-tool editing, engineering
- Brandy Norwood – vocals, writing
- Nora Payne – writing
- Kenisha Pratt – writing
- Javier Valverde – engineering assistance

== Charts ==
=== Weekly charts ===
Weekly chart performance for "What About Us?"
Chart (2002)	Peak position
Australia (ARIA)	6
Australian Urban (ARIA)	2
Austria (Ö3 Austria Top 40)	40
Belgium (Ultratop 50 Flanders)	20
Belgium (Ultratop 50 Wallonia)	13
Canada (Nielsen SoundScan)	16
Czech Republic (Rádio – Top 100)	42
Denmark (Tracklisten)	7
Europe (Eurochart Hot 100)	12
France (SNEP)	24
Germany (GfK)	13
Ireland (IRMA)	17
Italy (FIMI)	26
Netherlands (Dutch Top 40)	15
Netherlands (Single Top 100)	11
New Zealand (Recorded Music NZ)	8
Norway (VG-lista)	11
Scotland Singles (Official Charts)	8
Sweden (Sverigetopplistan)	16
Switzerland (Schweizer Hitparade)	8
UK Singles (Official Charts)	4
UK Hip Hop/R&B (Official Charts)	1
US Billboard Hot 100	7
US Dance Singles Sales (Billboard) Dance mixes	17
US Hot R&B/Hip-Hop Songs (Billboard)	3
US Pop Airplay (Billboard)	17
US Rhythmic Airplay (Billboard)	5

=== Year-end charts ===
Year-end chart performance for "What About Us?"
Chart (2002)	Position
Australia (ARIA)	65
Netherlands (Dutch Top 40)	132
Switzerland (Schweizer Hitparade)	80
UK Singles (OCC)	97
UK Urban (Music Week)	15
US Billboard Hot 100	65
US Hot R&B/Hip-Hop Singles & Tracks (Billboard)	49
US Mainstream Top 40 (Billboard)	79
US Rhythmic Top 40 (Billboard)	58

== Certifications ==
Certifications for "What About Us?"
Region	Certification	Certified units/sales
Australia (ARIA)	Gold	35,000^{^}
^{^} Shipments figures based on certification alone.

== Release history ==
Release dates and formats for "What About Us?"
Region	Date	Format(s)	Label(s)	Ref(s).
United States	January 1, 2002	7-inch vinyl	Atlantic	
United States	January 2, 2002	Streaming	Atlantic	
United States	January 22, 2002	Contemporary hit radio; rhythmic contemporary radio; urban contemporary radio	Atlantic	
United States	January 29, 2002	12-inch vinyl	Atlantic	
Germany	February 5, 2002	Maxi CD	Warner Music	
United Kingdom	February 11, 2002	12-inch vinyl; cassette; maxi CD	Atlantic	
Australia	February 18, 2002	Maxi CD	Warner Music	
France	February 19, 2002	12-inch vinyl; CD; maxi CD	East West	

== Bibliography ==
- Danielsen, Anne (2010). Musical Rhythm in the Age of Digital Reproduction. Ashgate Publishing. ISBN 9781138246843.
