= Kasper Bjørke =

Danish DJ and producer

- Also known as: Kasper Bjørke & his friendly ghost
- Born: Denmark
- Genre: Electronic
- Occupations: Songwriter, musician, record producer, DJ
- Years active: 2001–present
- Label: hfn music
- Website: kasperbjorke.com

Kasper Bjørke is a Danish DJ, record producer and remixer from Copenhagen.

== History ==
=== Filur ===
Bjørke started making music in the disco house duo Filur with Tomas Barfod in 1999. Filur released four studio albums: Exciting Comfort (2000), Deeply Superficial (2002), Into the Wasteland (2006), Faces (2011) and the “Best Of compilation” In Retrospect (2009). They are known for the hits „Its Alright“, "I Want You" and later for "The Con" and "Concentrate!" and for working with guest vocalists such as Stina Nordenstam, Pernille Rosendahl, Magnum Coltrane Price, Simon Kvamm (Nephew), Daniel Agust (GusGus), Josephine Philip (Darkness Falls), Nellie Ettison and many more. They frequently toured the United States, Europe and Japan where they also reached the top of Tokyo Hot 100 chart and sold 40.000 albums. Filur played Arena Stage at Roskilde Festival as their final liveshow in 2003. After that they only performed as DJs. Filur won two DMA Awards for "Best Producers" and "Best Dance Album" and several other awards incl. a DR P3 Guld award for Best Hit. Filur stopped in 2012.

=== Solo and production ===
Since 2007 Bjørke has been producing and releasing music under his own name. His first solo album In Gumbo (2007) released on NYC label Plant Music, is drawing on elements from rave-rock, disco, kraut, house, techno and electro. Two singles from the album, "Back and Spine" and "Doesn't Matter", both appeared on heavy rotation on Danish National Radio DR P3. That was followed by a second album Standing on Top of Utopia (2010). The first single from the album "Young Again" became another hit and featured the vocals of Jacob Bellens, the singer of I Got You On Tape and Murder. Kaspers cover version of “Heaven” (The Rolling Stones) featured Louise Foo (Giana Factory) and got a remix by Nicolas Jaar, which received great attention from DJs around the globe. Other collaborators on the album included Dennis Young (Liquid Liquid) and the Italian string composer Davide Rossi (Goldfrapp, Coldplay, Jon Hopkins, The Verve). Fool, the “tongue in cheek” self-ironic entitled third album, is another tour de force in Bjørke’s signature production style – this time wrapped up as a concept album and released on Fool’s day, 1 April 2012. Like a vinyl record, the track list has been split into two sides: The pop infused vocal-based bittersweet love songs of the “Hungry side” is halfway through taken over by an Overture that leads into the darker and mainly instrumental “Foolish side”, containing spaced out psychedelic trips and no-wave disco voyages. Bjørke continues his close collaboration with Jacob Bellens who is featured on 4 songs on the album (five on the digital version), including the first single „Lose Yourself to Jenny“. The other guest-artists are Emma Acs and one of Kaspers main inspirations: Laid Back. On the visual side, the album is perfectly complemented by the artwork of the British producer and designer Trevor Jackson. Kaspers fourth studio album is scheduled for an autumn 2014 release on German hfn music

=== Sideprojects ===
Together with Tomas Barfod Kasper formed the DJ/party project Superbacon and released an EP on Mirau Musik in 2010 and performed at Roskilde Festival as well as venues around Europe. From 2009 to 2010 Bjørke also released under the moniker Kasper Bjørke & His Friendly Ghost on Compost Black Records et.al. Since 2012 Bjørke is teaming up with Jón Atli Helgason (aka Sexy Lazer) for the camp project The Mansisters. They so far released EPs on My Favorite Robot and Correspondant Records while performing at venues and festivals around Europe. Kasper is also producing a full album for Jacob Bellens and constantly is working on new, other projects.

=== Remixes ===
Remixes are a vital part from the beginning of Bjørke's career. He has been remixing artists like Moby, Trentemøller, Ilya Santana, Wareika, Michoacan, Gluteus Maximus, WhoMadeWho, Darkness Falls, Laid Back, Martin Brodin, Human Woman, Reptile Youth, etc.. In return Kasper Bjørke also curated a string of remixes of his music by artists like Nicolas Jaar, Trentemøller, Kenton Slash Demon, Mano Le Tough, Wareika, Catz’n’Dogz et.al. A selection of the best remix works has been released on the digital album Remix Crusades 2007–2013.

=== DJ ===
As a DJ Bjørke is travelling the world, playing legendary venues like Le Bain, Output (New York), Fabric (London), Rex Club, Social Club (Paris), Electric Pickle (Miami), Panorama Bar, Kater Holzig, Watergate, (Berlin), D Edge (São Paulo), Gewölbe (Cologne), Kong, Charlie (Münich), Hive (Zurich), Culture Box (Copenhagen), and festivals like Sonar Reykjavik, Roskilde Festival, Calvi On The Rocks, Brooklyn Electronic Music Festival, Trailer Park Festival, Montreaux Jazz Festival, Iceland Airwaves Festival and many more. For two years (2012–2013), Kasper hosted his own radio show “4/4” on Danish national radio DR P6 Beat, playing everything from techno to disco and New Wave classics.

=== Management ===
Right from the beginning of his musical career Bjørke has also been working in various positions behind the scenes as A&R, artist manager and all around music entrepreneur. He discovered, developed and signed the artist Oh Land during the 4 years he built the label roster of indie label Fake Diamond (where he also signed artists like Complicated Universal Cum, The Late Great Fitzcarraldos, Darkness Falls, Peder, Kim LAS, Bon Homme etc.), but in 2011 Kasper decided to focus fully on artist management and his own studio releases. He has been personal manager for Trentemøller since 2008 and also co-manages the Danish band Reptile Youth.

== Personal life ==
Bjørke lives in a spacious apartment in an 1889 building, designed by Danish architect Ole Boye, in Copenhagen Frederiksberg with his partner Fie Paarup and their son.

== Discography ==
=== Albums ===
==== as part of Filur ====
- 2001: Exciting Comfort (DEN #38)
- 2002: Deeply Superficial (DEN –)
- 2003: Peace
- 2006: Into the Wasteland (DEN –)
- 2009: In Retroprospect
- 2011: Faces (DEN #23)

==== Solo ====
Year	Title	Peak position	Certification
Year	Title	DK	Certification
2007	In Gumbo	–	
2010	Standing on Top of Utopia	38	
2012	Fool	34	
2013	Remix Crusades	–	
2014	After Forever	–	
2016	Fountain of Youth	–	

=== Singles and EPs ===
==== as part of Filur ====
- 1999: "Crowdpusher"
- 2000: "It's Alright" (Filur meets Nellie Ettison) (ITA #49)
- 2001: "I Want You" (DEN #11)
- 2001: "Shame" (Filur meets Nellie Ettison) (ITA #53)
- 2001: "Drop"
- 2002: "Fallin'"
- 2003: "You & I"
- 2006: "The Con" (DEN #12)
- 2008: "Rental Car"
- 2008: "20 Lashes"
- 2010: "Welding Love"
- 2011: "Concentrate!" (Filur feat. Simon Kvamm) (DEN #19)

==== Solo ====
Year	Song	Peak	Certification	Album
Year	Song	DK	Certification	Album
2007	"Back & Spine"	–		
2008	"Doesn't Matter"	–		
2009	"Young Again"	21		
2010	"Heaven"	–		
2010	"Alcatraz"	–		
2010	"Alcatraz Remixes"	–		
2011	Symptoms EP	–		
2012	"Lose Yourself to Jenny" (with Jacob Bellens)	–		
2012	"Bohemian Soul" (with Jacob Bellens)	–		
2012	"Deep Is the Breath" (with Jacob Bellens and Emma Acs)	–		
2013	"Sunrise"	–		
2014	"Rush"	–		
2014	"Sylvia"	–		
2014	"TNR"	–		
2019	"Nothing Gold Can Stay (Part A)"	–		
2019	"Nothing Gold Can Stay (Part B)"	–		

==== as Kasper Bjørke and His Friendly Ghost ====
- 2009: "The Great Derangement"
- 2010: "The Go Away Song"

==== as Superbacon ====
- 2010: Superbacon EP

==== as The Mansisters ====
- 2010: E.P. Phone Home EP
- 2013: "Jennies Diner"
- 2014: Bullschnitzel EP
