= Kelly Price discography =

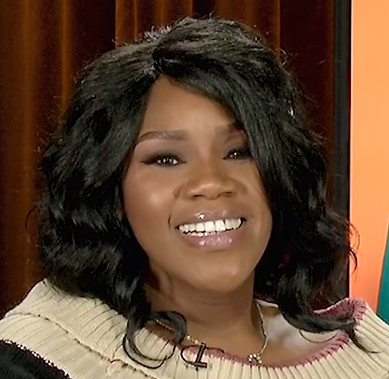
- Price in 2019.
- Studio albums: 7
- EPs: 1
- Compilation albums: 1

American singer Kelly Price started her singing career in 1992. She worked as a backing vocalist for singer Mariah Carey, before rising to greater prominence after making uncredited guest appearances on singles by rappers The Notorious B.I.G., and Mase. In 1998, Price released her debut album Soul of a Woman. It debuted and peaked at number 15 on the US Billboard 200 and spawned the R&B number-one hit single "Friend of Mine." In 1999, Soul of a Woman was certified platinum by the Recording Industry Association of America (RIAA), and by 2003, it had sold 1.13 million copies in the United States.

Mirror Mirror, Price's second album, was released in 2000. Her first top ten album, it debuted and peaked at number five on the Billboard 200 with first week sales of 157,000 copies. In 2001, the album was certified platinum by the RIAA. By July 2003, Mirror Mirror had sold 1.07 million copies in the United States. Following the release of her 2001 holiday album One Family: A Christmas Album, Price began work on her fourth studio album Priceless. Released in 2003, it debuted at number ten on the Billboard 200 with first week sales of 69,000 copies, but was commercially less successful than her previous albums.

After her departure from Def Soul, Price produced the gospel album This Is Who I Am. Released in 2006 via GospoCentric Records, it topped Billboard's Top Gospel Albums for two weeks and became her fourth top ten album on the Top R&B/Hip-Hop Albums chart. In 2011, her fifth album Kelly was released. A return to the R&B sounds of her previous albums, it debuted and peaked at number 36 in the Billboard 200 and became a top ten success on both the US Independent Albums and the Top R&B/Hip-Hop Albums chart. In 2014, Price released her seventh album Sing Pray Love, Vol. 1: Sing through eOne. It became her seventh top ten album on the Top R&B/Hip-Hop Albums chart.

== Albums ==
=== Studio albums ===
List of studio albums, with selected chart positions, and certifications
| Title | Album details | Peak chart positions | | | Certifications |
| Title | Album details | US | US R&B | NLD | Certifications |
|---|---|---|---|---|---|
| Soul of a Woman | Released: August 11, 1998; Label: T-Neck, Island | 15 | 2 | 80 | RIAA: Platinum |
| Mirror Mirror | Released: June 27, 2000; Label: Def Soul | 5 | 3 | — | RIAA: Platinum |
| One Family: A Christmas Album | Released: November 20, 2001; Label: Def Soul | 176 | 43 | — | |
| Priceless | Released: April 29, 2003; Label: Def Soul | 10 | 2 | — | |
| This Is Who I Am | Released: October 24, 2006; Label: EcclecticSounds, GospoCentric | 54 | 9 | — | |
| Kelly | Released: May 3, 2011; Label: Sang Girl, My Block, Malaco | 36 | 9 | — | |
| Sing Pray Love, Vol. 1: Sing | Released: June 3, 2014; Label: Sang Girl, eOne | 64 | 10 | — | |
"—" denotes releases that did not chart.

=== Compilation albums ===
List of compilation albums, with selected chart positions
| Title | Album details | Peak chart positions |
| Title | Album details | US R&B |
|---|---|---|
| The Best of Kelly Price | Released: October 23, 2007; Label: Hip-O | 61 |
| Icon | Released: May 23, 2011; Label: Def Jam | — |
"—" denotes releases that did not chart.

== Extended plays ==
List of extended plays
| Title | EP details |
|---|---|
| Grace | Released: April 2, 2021; Label: Sang Girl, Motown |

== Singles ==
=== As lead artist ===
| Title | Year | Peak chart positions | | | Album |
| Title | Year | US | US R&B | UK | Album |
|---|---|---|---|---|---|
| "Friend of Mine (Remix)" (featuring R. Kelly and Ronald Isley) | 1998 | 12 | 1 | 25 | Soul of a Woman |
| "Secret Love" | 1999 | — (Note: "Secret Love" did not enter the Billboard Hot 100, but peaked at number 12 on the Bubbling Under Hot 100 Singles chart, which acts as an extension to the Hot 100.) | 34 | 26 | Soul of a Woman |
| "Soul of a Woman" | 1999 | — | — | — | Soul of a Woman |
| "It's Gonna Rain" | 1999 | — | 51 | — | Life soundtrack |
| "While You Were Gone" | 1999 | — | — | — | Blue Streak soundtrack |
| "As We Lay" | 2000 | 64 | 12 | — | Mirror Mirror |
| "Love Sets You Free (Remix)" | 2000 | 91 | 24 | — | Mirror Mirror |
| "You Should've Told Me" | 2000 | 64 | 16 | — | Mirror Mirror |
| "Mirror, Mirror" | 2001 | — (Note: "Mirror, Mirror" did not enter the Billboard Hot 100, but peaked at number 33 on the US Dance Club Songs chart.) | — | — | Mirror Mirror |
| "In Love at Christmas" (featuring Mary Mary) | 2002 | — | 71 | — | One Family – A Christmas Album |
| "Take It To The Head" (featuring Keith Murray) | 2002 | — | 125 | — | Priceless |
| "Someday" | 2002 | — | 112 | — | Priceless |
| "How Does It Feel (Married Your Girl)" | 2002 | — | 117 | — | Priceless |
| "He Proposed" | 2003 | — | 58 | — | Priceless |
| "This Is Who I Am" | 2006 | — | 120 | — | This Is Who I Am |
| "Healing" | 2006 | — | 110 | — | This Is Who I Am |
| "Tired" | 2010 | — | 82 | — | Kelly |
| "Not My Daddy" (with Stokley and Mint Condition) | 2011 | — (Note: "Not My Daddy" did not enter the Billboard Hot 100, but peaked at number 22 on the Bubbling Under Hot 100 Singles chart, which acts as an extension to the Hot 100.) | 22 | — | Kelly and 7... |
| "Himaholic" | 2011 | — | 69 | — | Kelly |
| "Ain't No Way" | 2013 | — | — | — | Iyanla Vanzant – In the Meantime |
| "It's My Time" | 2014 | — | 32 | — | Sing Pray Love, Vol. 1: Sing |
| "Everytime (Grateful)" | 2016 | — | — | — | Non-album singles |
| "What I Need (Give Me What I Need)" | 2020 | — | — | — | Non-album singles |
| "UnSung" | 2020 | — | — | — | Non-album singles |
| "Grace" | 2021 | — | — | — | Grace |
| "Dance Party" | 2021 | — | — | — | Grace |
"—" denotes releases that did not chart.

=== As featured performer ===
| Title | Year | Peak chart positions | | | | | | | | | | Album |
| Title | Year | US | US R&B | AUS | CAN | FRA | GER | IRE | NDL | SWI | UK | Album |
|---|---|---|---|---|---|---|---|---|---|---|---|---|
| "Heartbreak Hotel" (Whitney Houston featuring Faith Evans & Kelly Price) | 1998 | 2 | 1 | 17 | 16 | 7 | 61 | 41 | 35 | 77 | 25 | My Love Is Your Love |
| "You and Me" (LL Cool J featuring Kelly Price) | 2000 | — | 59 | 95 | — | — | 32 | — | 49 | 85 | — | G.O.A.T. |
| "God's Gift" (Jeff Majors featuring Kelly Price) | 2006 | — | 32 | — | — | — | — | — | — | — | — | Non-album single |
| "Ultralight Beam" (Kanye West featuring Chance the Rapper & Kelly Price) | 2016 | 67 | 22 | — | 88 | — | — | 78 | — | 5 | 63 | The Life of Pablo |
"—" denotes releases that did not chart.

== Guest appearances ==
List of non-single guest appearances, with other performing artists, showing year released and album name
| Title | Year | Other artist(s) | Album |
|---|---|---|---|
| "You Must Love Me" | 1997 | Jay-Z | In My Lifetime, Vol. 1 |
| "No Way Out" | 1997 | Puff Daddy, Black Rob | Money Talks (soundtrack) |
| "Don't Stop What You're Doing" | 1997 | Puff Daddy, Lil' Kim | No Way Out and Soul Food (soundtrack) |
| "Do You Know?" | 1997 | Puff Daddy | No Way Out |
| "I'll Do This For You" | 1997 | Puff Daddy | No Way Out |
| "Young G's" | 1997 | Puff Daddy, Jay-Z, The Notorious B.I.G. | No Way Out |
| "Mo Money Mo Problems" | 1997 | The Notorious B.I.G., Puff Daddy, Mase | Life After Death |
| "I Wanna Thank You" | 1998 | The Lox | Money, Power & Respect |
| "So Right" | 1998 | The Lox | Money, Power & Respect |
| "Through the Rain (Remix)" | 2002 | Mariah Carey and Joe | Charmbracelet |
| "Sue Me" | 2019 | Wale | Wow... That's Crazy |
| "Set You Free" | 2019 | Wale | Wow... That's Crazy |

== Soundtracks ==
List of soundtrack appearances, showing year released
| Title | Year | Album |
|---|---|---|
| "Heat" | 1998 | Hav Plenty |
| "The Gods Love Nubia" | 1999 | Elton John and Tim Rice's Aida |
| "While You Were Gone" | 1999 | Blue Streak |
| "It's Gonna Rain" | 2000 | Life |
| "Love Sets You Free" | 2000 | The Hurricane |
| "Ain't Nobody" | 2003 | Bringing Down the House |
