= Shep Crawford =

- Also known as: Schappel Crawford
- Born: Anthony Schappel Crawford; December 18, 1970 (age 55); Los Angeles, California, U.S.
- Genres: Rhythm and blues, gospel music
- Occupations: Musician, songwriter, record producer, composer
- Instruments: Piano, organ
- Years active: 1995 - present

Shep Crawford (December 18, 1970) is a Grammy Award-winning American R&B and gospel musician, songwriter, and record producer best known for Whitney Houston's "Same Script, Different Cast", Deborah Cox's "Nobody's Supposed to Be Here", Tamia's "Stranger in My House", Sisqó's "Incomplete", Luther Vandross' "I'd Rather" and Kelly Price's "As We Lay". He is the founder and pastor of The Experience Christian Ministries in Los Angeles, California.

== Early life and influences ==
Crawford was born and raised in Los Angeles. He attended Carver Missionary Baptist Church with his family where he learned musicianship from Pastor Richard Stubbs. At the age of eight, Crawford began playing the piano and organ for the Carver Church each week. At the age of 19, he became a licensed pastor at Love and Unity Community Church by Pastor Carl A. McCorkle.

== Career ==
Crawford has written and produced multiple albums for chart-topping artists, including Whitney Houston, Luther Vandross, Tamia, Deborah Cox, Montell Jordan, and Kelly Price.

In 1995, Crawford co-produced the song "Daddy's Home" on Montell Jordan's debut album This Is How We Do It. Jordan brought Crawford on as his music director, after having known each other as musicians in church during their childhood, and Crawford began his professional career.

In 1998, he produced and co-wrote the platinum single Deborah Cox track "Nobody's Supposed to Be Here". The song was certified Platinum in the United States, spending a then-record fourteen weeks at number 1 on the Hot R&B/Hip-Hop Songs chart, and ranking at number 1 on the Billboard Dance Club Songs chart and number 2 on the Billboard Hot 100 Chart. In 2017, Billboard ranked the song at number 5 on its Greatest of All Time Hot R&B/Hip-Hop Songs chart.

It won the Soul Train Music Award for Best R&B/Soul Single (Female) and was nominated for the Billboard Music Award for Top R&B Song. He also wrote and produced the 1998 Deborah Cox track "We Can't Be Friends" which ranked at number 1 on the Billboard R&B/Hip-Hop Airplay chart for two weeks.

In 1999, Crawford produced and co-wrote the Sisqó song "Incomplete". The song was certified Platinum in the United States and ranked at number 1 on both the Billboard Hot 100 Chart and the Billboard Hot R&B/Hip-Hop Singles & Tracks chart.

In 2000, he produced the Whitney Houston and Deborah Cox duet "Same Script, Different Cast". It was nominated for the Soul Train Music Award for Best R&B/Soul Single (Group, Band or Duo). He also began working with Kelly Price and went on to produce multiple albums for her. That same year, Crawford was named as one of the top three producers and songwriters of the year by Billboard.

In 2001, Crawford won both the Grammy Award for Best Traditional R&B Performance for Glady Knight's album At Last and the Grammy Award for Best Contemporary Soul Gospel Album for Yolanda Adams' album The Experience. In 2003, Crawford won the Grammy Award for Song of the Year, the Grammy Award for Best Male R&B Vocal Performance, and the Grammy Award for Best R&B Album, and was nominated for the Grammy Award for Best R&B Song for Luther Vandross' album Dance With My Father. That same year, he wrote and produced the song "Stranger in My House" for Tamia. The song was ranked number 1 on the Billboard Dance Club Songs chart. He also founded 45 Live Records with former manager Erica Grayson and signed his first artist Onitsha, to produce her debut album Church Girl in collaboration with Still Waters, a division of Hidden Beach Recordings.

In 2012, he produced select songs on Tamia's album, Beautiful Surprise. The album and song of the same name were nominated for Best R&B Album and Best R&B Song at the 55th Annual Grammy Awards in 2013.

== Discography ==
=== Vocals ===
Year	Title	Album	Label	Other Artist(s)
1995	Daddy's Home	This Is How We Do It	PMP Records	Montell Jordan
1996	I Am L.V.	I Am L.V.	Tommy Boy Records, East West Records	L.V.
1999	We Can't Be Friends	One Wish	Arista Records	Deborah Cox
2000	Same Script, Different Cast	Whitney: The Greatest Hits	Arista Records	Whitney Houston, Deborah Cox
2001	Beautiful Girl	Jersey Ave	MCA Records	Jersey Ave
2010	Same Script, Different Cast	The Essential Whitney Houston	Arista Records, Sony Music, Legacy Recordings	Whitney Houston, Deborah Cox

=== Instruments and performance ===
Year	Title	Album	Label	Other Artist(s)
1996	I Am L.V.	I Am L.V.	Tommy Boy Records, East West Records	L.V.
1996	I Like	I Like (single)	Def Jam Recordings	Montell Jordan feat. Slick Rick
1997	All About Us	Time	Mushroom Records	Peter Andre
1997	Dreaming	98°	Motown, BMG Direct Marketing	98°
1998	Nobody's Supposed to Be Here	One Wish	Arista Records, BMG	Deborah Cox
1998	All Night, All Right	Time	Mushroom Records	Peter Andre feat. Warren G
1999	Keys	Keys (single)	TVT Records	LaTanya
1999	Careless Whisper	The Dance	Capitol Records	Dave Koz feat. Montell Jordan
1999	We Can't Be Friends	One Wish	Arista Records	Deborah Cox
2000	Tell Me Who	Can't Go For That	Elektra Records	Tamia
2000	Same Script, Different Cast	Whitney: The Greatest Hits	Arista Records	Whitney Houston, Deborah Cox
2000	Married Man	Mirror Mirror	Def Soul	Kelly Price
2000	Thank You in Advance	Thank You in Advance (LP)	Universal Records	Boyz II Men
2001	Don't Deserve	Weekend	Arista Records	Kenny Lattimore
2001	Stranger in My House	Stranger in My House (single)	Elektra Records	Tamia
2001	At Last (album)	At Last	MCA Music Corp of America	Gladys Knight
2001	I Gotta Believe	Believe	Elektra Records	Yolanda Adams
2001	I'd Rather	Luther Vandross	J Records	Luther Vandross
2001	Against All Odds	Urban Renewal	WEA Records, Warner Music Australasia	Various Artists
2002	Starting With You	The Morning After	J Records	Deborah Cox
2002	I Showed Her	O2	J Records, BMG	O-Town
2003	Buy Me a Rose	Dance with My Father	J Records	Luther Vandross
2004	Tomorrow	More	Elektra Records	Tamia
2006	Wait a Minute	In My Mind	RCA Records	Heather Headley
2006	Love and I	Between Friends	Image Entertainment, Plus 1 Music Group	Tamia
2006	This Is Who I Am (album)	This Is Who I Am (album)	Ecclecti Sounds Entertainment, GospoCentric Records, Zomba Label Group	Kelly Price
2010	Same Script, Different Cast	The Essential Whitney Houston	Arista Records, Sony Music, Legacy Recordings	Whitney Houston, Deborah Cox
2010	Settle	For Colored Girls: Music From and Inspired by the Original Motion Picture Soundtrack	Atlantic Records	Various Artists
2011	Mirror	Unbelievable	Shanachie Records	Keke Wyatt
2012	Because of You	Beautiful Surprise	Plus 1 Music Group	Tamia
2014	Sing, Pray, Love, Vol 1: Sing (album)	Sing, Pray, Love, Vol 1: Sing	eOne	Kelly Price
2015	Black Butterfly	Love Life	Def Jam Recordings, Plus 1 Music Group	Tamia

=== Writing and arrangement ===
Year	Title	Album	Label	Other Artist(s)
1995	Daddy's Home	This Is How We Do It	PMP Records	Montell Jordan
1997	Dreaming	98°	Motown, BMG Direct Marketing	98°
1998	Anything and Everything	Let's Ride	Def Jam Recordings	Montell Jordan feat. Master P and Silkk the Shocker
1998	Nobody's Supposed to Be Here	One Wish	Arista Records, BMG	Deborah Cox
1998	Talk Show Shhh!	Talk Show	Universal Records	Shae Jones
1998	When You Get Home	Let's Ride	Def Jam Recordings	Montell Jordan
1999	Once Upon a Time	Get It On... Tonite	Def Soul	Montell Jordan
1999	Nobody's Supposed to Be Here	Totally Hits	Arista Records	Various Artists
1999	Keys	Keys (single)	TVT Records	LaTanya
1999	Incomplete	Unleash the Dragon	Def Soul, Dragon Records, Creative Management Group	Sisqó
2000	Tell Me Who	Can't Go For That	Elektra Records	Tamia
2000	If I Were You	A Nu Day	Elektra Records	Tamia
2000	Careless Whisper	The Dance	Capitol Records	Dave Koz feat. Montell Jordan
2000	Same Script, Different Cast	Whitney: The Greatest Hits	Arista Records	Whitney Houston, Deborah Cox
2000	I Finally Know	Nathan Michael Shawn Wanya	Universal Records	Boyz II Men
2000	Married Man	Mirror Mirror	Def Soul	Kelly Price
2000	Never Let Go	My Everything	Universal Records	98°
2000	Thank You in Advance	Thank You in Advance (LP)	Universal Records	Boyz II Men
2000	Tell Me Who	Can't Go For That	Elektra Records	Tamia
2001	I'd Rather	Luther Vandross	J Records	Luther Vandross
2001	Against All Odds	Urban Renewal	WEA Records, Warner Music Australasia	Various Artists
2001	Stranger in My House	Stranger in My House (single)	Elektra Records	Tamia
2001	Nobody's Supposed to Be Here	Oh What A Feeling 2, A Vital Collection Of Canadian Music	Universal Records	Various Artists
2001	I Didn't Realize	Jesse Powell	MCA Records, Victor Entertainment, Silas Records	Jesse Powell
2001	Fo' Sho'	Believe	Elektra Records	Yolanda Adams
2001	What's Wrong	What's Wrong	MCA Records	Pam & Dodi
2001	At Last (album)	At Last	MCA Music Corp of America	Gladys Knight
2001	Don't Deserve	Weekend	Arista Records	Kenny Lattimore
2001	Incomplete	Top Of The Pops 2001 Volume One	Universal Music TV	Various Artists
2001	Stranger in My House	Totally Dance	Arista Records	Various Artists
2001	Nobody's Supposed to Be Here	Fashion Cares: 15th Anniversary Retrospective	Universal Records	Various Artists
2001	Beautiful Girl	Jersey Ave	MCA Records	Jersey Ave
2002	Always Been Your Girl	This Is Who I Am	RCA Records, BMG Canada	Heather Headley
2002	I Showed Her	O2	J Records	O-Town
2002	Starting With You	The Morning After	J Records	Deborah Cox
2003	Miss You	My Soul	DreamWorks Records	
2003	Sleep in the Middle	Bittersweet	Arista Records	Blu Cantrell
2004	Stranger in My House	Still (Dance Mixes)	Arista Records	Tamia
2004	We Can't Be Friends	Ultimate	Ultimate Records	Deborah Cox
2004	Tomorrow	More	Elektra Records	Tamia
2004	Nobody's Supposed to Be Here	Oprah's Pop Star Challenge 2004 Cast Album: Dreams Really Do Come True	Epic Records	Various Artists
2004	Stranger in My House	All That Urban	Warner Music Australasia	Various Artists
2005	Sleep in the Middle	Hit 'Em Up Style: Chart And Club Hits Of Blu Cantrell	CMG	Blu Cantrell
2006	Love and I	Between Friends	Image Entertainment, Plus 1 Music Group	Tamia
2006	Wait a Minute	In My Mind	RCA Records	Heather Headley
2006	Please Don't Forget	Grateful	Light Records	Coko
2006	The Closing	The Book Of David: Vol. 1 The Transition	GospoCentric Records, Zomba Label Group	Dave Hollister
2006	This Is Who I Am (album)	This Is Who I Am (album)	Ecclecti Sounds Entertainment, GospoCentric Records, Zomba Label Group	Kelly Price
2008	The Promise (album)	The Promise (album)	Deco Recording Group	Deborah Cox
2008	Incomplete	R&B Love Collection 2008	Universal Music TV	Various Artists
2010	Settle	For Colored Girls: Music From and Inspired by the Original Motion Picture Soundtrack	Atlantic Records	Various Artists
2010	Same Script, Different Cast	The Essential Whitney Houston	Arista Records, Sony Music, Legacy Recordings	Whitney Houston
2011	Everybody's Girl	Love?	Island Records	Jennifer Lopez
2011	Mirror	Unbelievable	Shanachie Records	Keke Wyatt
2011	Play Your Part	S.O.U.L.	Sony Music Commercial Music Group	Deborah Cox
2012	Because of You	Beautiful Surprise	Plus 1 Music Group	Tamia
2014	Sing, Pray, Love, Vol 1: Sing (album)	Sing, Pray, Love, Vol 1: Sing	eOne	Kelly Price

=== Production ===
Year	Title	Album	Label	Other Artist(s)
1995	Daddy's Home	This Is How We Do It	PMP Records	Montell Jordan
1995	Jungle Groove	Ace Ventura (When Nature Calls)	MCA Soundtracks	Various Artists
1995	I Am L.V.	I Am L.V.	Tommy Boy Records, East West Records	L.V.
1997	Dreaming	98°	Motown, BMG Direct Marketing	98°
1997	All About Us	Time	Mushroom Records	Peter Andre
1998	All Night, All Right	Time	Mushroom Records	Peter Andre feat. Warren G
1998	Nobody's Supposed to Be Here	One Wish	Arista Records, BMG	Deborah Cox
1998	Talk Show Shhh!	Talk Show	Universal Records	Shae Jones
1998	When You Get Home	Let's Ride	Def Jam Recordings	Montell Jordan
1998	Once Upon a Time	Get It On... Tonite	Def Soul	Montell Jordan
1999	Careless Whisper	The Dance	Capitol Records	Dave Koz feat. Montell Jordan
1999	Incomplete	Unleash the Dragon	Def Soul, Dragon Records, Creative Management Group	Sisqó
1999	We Can't Be Friends	One Wish	Arista Records	Deborah Cox
1999	Keys	Keys (single)	TVT Records	LaTanya
1999	Once Upon a Time	Get It On... Tonite	Def Soul	Montell Jordan
1999	Everytime	Talk Show	Universal Records	Shae Jones
2000	Never Let Go	My Everything	Universal Records	98°
2000	Thank You in Advance	Thank You in Advance (LP)	Universal Records	Boyz II Men
2000	Married Man	Mirror Mirror	Def Soul	Kelly Price
2000	A Nu Day (album)	A Nu Day	Elektra Records	Tamia
2000	Tell Me Who	Can't Go For That	Elektra Records	Tamia
2000	Same Script, Different Cast	Whitney: The Greatest Hits	Arista Records	Whitney Houston, Deborah Cox
2000	I Finally Know	Nathan Michael Shawn Wanya	Universal Records	Boyz II Men
2001	I Didn't Realize	Jesse Powell	MCA Records, Victor Entertainment, Silas Records	Jesse Powell
2001	Stranger in My House	Stranger in My House (single)	Elektra Records	Tamia
2001	At Last (album)	At Last	MCA Music Corp of America	Gladys Knight
2001	Based on a True Story (album)	Based on a True Story	Elektra Records	Lil' Mo
2001	Against All Odds	Urban Renewal	WEA Records, Warner Music Australasia	Various Artists
2001	What's Wrong	What's Wrong	MCA Records	Pam & Dodi
2001	I'd Rather	Luther Vandross	J Records	Luther Vandross
2001	Fo' Sho'	Believe	Elektra Records	Yolanda Adams
2001	I Believe I Can Fly	The Experience	Elektra Records	Yolanda Adams feat. Gerald Levert
2001	Beautiful Girl	Jersey Ave	MCA Records	Jersey Ave
2002	With a Kiss	The Kiss	GospoCentric Records	Trin-i-tee 5:7
2002	Starting With You	The Morning After	J Records	Deborah Cox
2002	Never Let Go	My Everything	Universal Records	98°
2002	I Showed Her	O2	J Records	O-Town
2002	Always Been Your Girl	This Is Who I Am	RCA Records, BMG Canada	Heather Headley
2003	Sleep in the Middle	Bittersweet	Arista Records	Blu Cantrell
2003	Buy Me a Rose	Dance with My Father	J Records	Luther Vandross
2003	Play Your Part	Ultra Dance 04	Ultra Records	Deborah Cox
2003	Something Happened on the Way to Heaven / Starting with You	Something Happened on the Way to Heaven / Starting with You	J Records	Deborah Cox
2003	Tomorrow	More	Elektra Records	Tamia
2005	It's Gon Be Nice	Day by Day	Atlantic Records	Yolanda Adams
2006	Please Don't Forget	Grateful	Light Records	Coko
2006	Wait a Minute	In My Mind	RCA Records	Heather Headley
2006	Love and I	Between Friends	Image Entertainment, Plus 1 Music Group	Tamia
2006	The Closing	The Book Of David: Vol. 1 The Transition	GospoCentric Records, Zomba Label Group	Dave Hollister
2007	Church Girl (album)	Church Girl	Hidden Beach Recordings, Still Waters Recordings	Onitsha
2007	Back For My Heart	Sampler	Not On Label	The Blayse
2008	The Promise (album)	The Promise (album)	Deco Recording Group	Deborah Cox
2010	Settle	For Colored Girls: Music From and Inspired by the Original Motion Picture Soundtrack	Atlantic Records	Various Artists
2010	Same Script, Different Cast	The Essential Whitney Houston	Arista Records, Sony Music, Legacy Recordings	Whitney Houston
2011	A Treasure (album)	A Treasure	Reprise Records	Neil Young / International Harvesters
2011	Mirror	Unbelievable	Shanachie Records	Keke Wyatt
2012	Because of You	Beautiful Surprise	Plus 1 Music Group	Tamia
2014	Sing, Pray, Love, Vol 1: Sing (album)	Sing, Pray, Love, Vol 1: Sing	eOne	Kelly Price
2015	Black Butterfly	Love Life	Def Jam Recordings, Plus 1 Music Group	Tamia

== Filmography ==
=== Film ===
Year	Title	Role	Notes
1996	The Nutty Professor	Writer ("Bounce 2 This"), Producer ("Jungle Groove")	
2009	Not Easily Broken	Writer ("Have to Go Through It")	
2010	For Colored Girls	Writer ("Settle")	
2011	Madea's Big Happy Family	Writer ("Tired")	

=== Television ===
Year	Title	Role	Notes
2003	Star Search	Writer ("Nobody's Supposed to Be Here"), Writer ("Incomplete")	2 episodes
2004	New Zealand Idol	Writer ("Incomplete")	Episode: "Top 24 Group 3 Performance Show"
2004	Canadian Idol	Writer ("Nobody's Supposed to Be Here")	3 episodes
2005	American Idol: The Search for a Superstar	Writer ("Incomplete")	Episode: "Top 11 Perform"
2007	Idols	Writer ("Stranger in My House")	Episode: "Top 4: My Idols"
2013	Dancing with the Stars	Writer ("Woman's World")	Episode: "Cher Week"
2014-16	Unsung	Himself	2 episodes
2016	Superstar Duets	Writer ("I'd Rather")	Episode: "Do or Die"

== Awards and nominations ==
In 2000, Crawford was named as one of the top three producers and songwriters of the year by Billboard.

=== Grammy Awards ===
Year	Nominee / work	Award	Result
2001	Glady Knight's At Last	Grammy Award for Best Traditional R&B Performance	Won
2001	Yolanda Adams' The Experience	Grammy Award for Best Contemporary Soul Gospel Album	Won
2003	Luther Vandross' Dance With My Father	Grammy Award for Best R&B Song	Nominated
2003	Luther Vandross' Dance With My Father	Grammy Award for Song of the Year	Won
2003	Luther Vandross' Dance With My Father	Grammy Award for Best Male R&B Vocal Performance	Won
2003	Luther Vandross' Dance With My Father	Grammy Award for Best R&B Album	Won
2013	Tamia's Beautiful Surprise	Grammy Award for Best R&B Album	Nominated
2013	Tamia's Beautiful Surprise	Grammy Award for Best R&B Song	Nominated

=== ASCAP Awards ===
Year	Nominee / work	Award	Result
2000	Deborah Cox's Nobody's Supposed to Be Here	ASCAP Rhythm & Soul Music Award	Won
2000	Deborah Cox's We Can't Be Friends	ASCAP Rhythm & Soul Music Award	Won
2002	Tamia's Stranger in My House	ASCAP Rhythm & Soul Music Award	Won

=== Billboard Music Awards ===
Year	Nominee / work	Award	Result
1998	Deborah Cox's Nobody's Supposed to Be Here	Billboard Music Award for Top R&B Song	Nominated

=== Soul Train Awards ===
Year	Nominee / work	Award	Result
1998	Deborah Cox's Nobody's Supposed to Be Here	Soul Train Music Award for Best R&B/Soul Single – Female	Won
1999	Deborah Cox's Nobody's Supposed to Be Here	Soul Train Lady of Soul Award for Best R&B/Soul Song of the Year	Won
