= Harvester =

Harvester may refer to:

== Agriculture and forestry ==
- Combine harvester, a machine commonly used to harvest grain crops
- Forage harvester, a machine used to harvest forage
- Harvester (forestry), a type of heavy vehicle employed in cut-to-length logging of trees
- International Harvester, a former agricultural machinery company

== Information technology ==
- Harvester (web), a tool to download websites
- Harvester (HCI), an open-source hyper-converged infrastructure started in 2020 by SUSE
- Bioinformatic Harvester, a bioinformatic meta search engine

== Music ==
- Harvester (band) or Träd, Gräs, och Stenar, a Swedish progressive band
- Harvester (American band), an American indie rock band
- The Harvesters (band), a Swedish alternative country band

== Movies and TV ==
- The Harvester (1927 film), an American silent comedy film
- The Harvester, a 1936 American comedy film
- The Harvesters (Doctor Who), a 1968, Doctor Who adventure serial
- The Harvesters (film), a 2018 film
- "The Harvester", a 2001 song by Animusic

== Places ==
- Burr Ridge, Illinois or Harvester
- Harvester, Missouri, an unincorporated community in St. Charles County

== Zoology ==
- Feniseca tarquinius or harvesters, a species of butterflies
- Miletinae or harvesters, a subfamily of butterflies
- Opiliones or harvesters, an order of arachnids superficially similar to spiders
- "Harvesters", a nickname used to refer to the antagonistic alien species featured in Independence Day and its sequel Independence Day: Resurgence.

== Other uses ==
- Harvester (horse), winner of the 1884 Epsom Derby
- The Harvesters (painting), a 1565 wood painting by Pieter Bruegel
- Harvester (restaurant), a British restaurant chain
- Harvester (video game), a 1996 computer adventure game
- Harvesters (Ancher), a 1905 oil painting by Anna Ancher
- HMS Harvester (H19), an H-class destroyer launched as HMS Handy in 1939
- Harvester, a fictional large vehicle in the 1965 novel Dune by Frank Herbert (see Dune terminology) and Dune games
- Harvester, an entity from the internet analog horror series Vita Carnis

== See also ==
- Harvester Judgment, a 1908 Australian High Court case that established the concept of a minimum wage
- HMS Harvester, a list of ships of the Royal Navy
- List of harvesters
- Theristai, a.k.a. Reapers or Harvesters, a lost satyr play by Euripides
- Energy harvesting
