= Same Script, Different Cast =

2000 single by Whitney Houston and Deborah Cox

Single by Whitney Houston and Deborah Cox

from the album Whitney: The Greatest Hits
- Released: May 2, 2000
- Studio: The Enterprise (Los Angeles); Crescent Moon (Miami, Florida)
- Length: 4:58
- Label: Arista
- Songwriters: Shae Jones; Shep Crawford; Montell Jordan
- Producer: Shep Crawford

Whitney Houston singles chronology
"I Learned from the Best" (1999)	"Same Script, Different Cast" (2000)	"Could I Have This Kiss Forever" (2000)

Deborah Cox singles chronology
"September" (2000)	"Same Script, Different Cast" (2000)	"Absolutely Not" (2001)

Licensed audio
- "Same Script, Different Cast" on YouTube

"Same Script, Different Cast" is a duet performed by American singer Whitney Houston and Canadian singer Deborah Cox. Written by Shep Crawford, Shae Jones and Montell Jordan, it was produced by Crawford for Houston's first compilation album, Whitney: The Greatest Hits (2000). The harp-string and piano-driven song opens with a backing track incorporating Ludwig van Beethoven's "Für Elise" and unfolds as an exchange between two women involved with the same man, with Houston portraying his former lover, who warns Cox about his deceitful behavior, while Cox initially dismisses her claims.

The song was released as a radio-only promoa single in the United States on May 2, 2000, by Arista Records, the first song to precede the compilation. "Same Script, Different Cast" was mostly well received, with critics praising its theatrical concept, vocal chemistry, and dramatic key changes. It became a moderate hit, peaking at number 70 on the Billboard Hot 100 and number 14 on the Hot R&B/Hip-Hop Singles & Tracks chart, while reaching number four on the Dance Club Play chart. As it was issued only as a promotional single, no music video was produced.

== Background ==
"Same Script, Different Cast" was written by Shep Crawford along with R&B singer Shae Jones and Montell Jordan, while production was overseen by Crawford. Although the song was not specifically conceived for Cox and Houston, it came to their attention after their mentor and Arista Records head, Clive Davis, asked Crawford to submit material for his artists to record. With both Cox and Houston interested in recording together, Davis arranged for the song to be recorded as a duet between the two singers, with the intention of including it on Houston’s first compilation album, Whitney: The Greatest Hits (2000). The recording process, however, proved less straightforward. Houston failed to appear for the initial studio sessions in New York, leaving Cox to record part of her vocals on her own. The two singers did not record together until the week of April 10, 2000, when both were in Los Angeles for Arista Records' 25th anniversary celebration concert. The eventual session marked a significant moment for Cox, who had long regarded Houston as an idol. Cox later recalled the experience as an intimate encounter in which the two singers stood "toe to toe" at the microphone, describing Houston as highly professional and capable of delivering her parts with precision.

== Critical reception ==
"Same Script, Different Cast" received mostly positive reviews from contemporary critics. Jim Farber of New York Daily News described the track as a "nice tête-à-tête" with Cox, and went on to call it a "grownup version of Brandy and Monica's 'The Boy Is Mine'". USA Today's Steve Jones wrote that this collaboration is "most telling" on the album's job at demonstrating that Houston's career was "still a work in progress". On a review for Whitney: The Greatest Hits, Michael Paoletta from Billboard called the track a "special highlight" from the album. Lynn Norment of Ebony agreed, saying it was one of the "special gems" on the record. The Star-Ledger's Jay Lustig wrote that although the track was not "much of a song", it gives the opportunity for Houston and Cox to "engage in some thrilling vocal sparring". Christine Galera of Orlando Sentinel wrote that the track "plays like a conversation in a Broadway musical. In the song, Houston warns her friend that her current boyfriend eventually will break her heart." On a contrary note, however, The Baltimore Sun's J. D. Considine panned the song, calling it "tepid" and "bloated". Ernest Hardy from LA Weekly wrote that the chemistry between Houston and Cox was "wasted on yet another trifling song about the doglike nature of men". David Quantick of Q thought that the new tracks on Whitney: The Greatest Hits, including "Same Script, Different Cast", would "stand out just enough to make fools soon be parted with their money".

Following Houston's death in 2012, Entertainment Weekly published a list of her 25 best songs and ranked "Same Script, Different Cast" at number 24, commenting "If the boy from the Brandy and Monica duet The Boy Is Mine grew up into a cad, burned Whitney, and took up with Deborah Cox." In November 2020, the duet was ranked number 23 by Billboard in their list of Houston's 25 best songs, writing that the "less-hyped diva down" was "much richer" than Houston's star-studded duet "When You Believe" with Mariah Carey, later writing, "the conceit is clever, the vocals are massive, and the key changes are as plentiful as you could ever hope for." In his list of Houston's 20 greatest songs, The Guardian's Alexis Petridis placed the song at number 13, writing "it takes a certain chutzpah to sample a classical piece as famous as Beethoven's Für Elise, but chutzpah is not something this duet is lacking in." In March 2025, Vibe ranked the song at number 12 on their list of the 20 Greatest R&B Duets Of The 21st Century.

== Formats and track listings ==
- 2×12-inch (US)

A: "Same Script, Different Cast" (Jonathan Peters Vocal Club Mix) — 9:35
B: "Same Script, Different Cast" (Joe Smooth Slang Club Mix) — 5:49
C: "Same Script, Different Cast" (Jonathan Peters Goes There Dub) — 11:07
D: "Same Script, Different Cast" (Victor Romeo Slang Vocal Mix) — 6:19

- Digital download (Dance Vault Mixes)
1. "Same Script, Different Cast" (Jonathan Peters Vocal Club Mix) — 9:38
2. "Same Script, Different Cast" (Joe Smooth Slang Club Mix) — 5:49
3. "Same Script, Different Cast" (Mel Hammond Beautiful Slang Dub) — 6:41
4. "Same Script, Different Cast" (Friburn & Urik Cover Your Ears Mix) — 10:40
5. "Same Script, Different Cast" (Jonathan Peters Goes There Dub) — 11:08
6. "Same Script, Different Cast" (Victor Romeo Slang Vocal Mix) — 6:23
7. "Same Script, Different Cast" (Jonathan Peters Radio Edit) — 4:20

== Credits ==
Recording and mixing

- Recorded by Anne Catalino at Enterprise Studios (Los Angeles) and Crescent Moon Studios (Miami, Florida)
- Mixed by Peter Mokran at Enterprise Studios (Los Angeles)

Credits

- Written by Stacey Daniels, Shae Jones, Shep Crawford, Montell Jordan
- Produced by Shep Crawford
- Tracked by Anne Catalino at The Hit Factory (New York City)
- Tracked by Jamie Seyberth at Paramount Recording Studios (Hollywood, California)
- String arrangements conducted by Shep Crawford & Joe Mardin
- Vocal arrangement: Whitney Houston, Shep Crawford & Kelly Price
- Guitar: Jay Williams
- All other instruments: Shep Crawford
- Background vocals: Shep Crawford, Deborah Cox & Shae Jones

== Charts ==
=== Weekly charts ===
Chart (2000)	Peak position
US Billboard Hot 100	70
US Dance Club Songs (Billboard)	4
US Hot R&B/Hip-Hop Songs (Billboard)	14

=== Year-end charts ===
Chart (2000)	Position
US R&B/Hip-Hop Singles & Tracks (Billboard)	64
