= Let's Ride =

Let's Ride may refer to:

- Let's Ride (album), an album by Montell Jordan
  - "Let's Ride" (Montell Jordan song), the title song
- "Let's Ride" (The Game song)
- "Let's Ride" (Choclair song)
- "Let's Ride" (Kid Rock song), a song from the 2012 album, Rebel Soul
- "Let's Ride" (Richie Rich song)
- "Let's Ride", a song by Airbourne from Runnin' Wild
- "Let's Ride", a song by Chingy from Hoodstar
- "Let's Ride", a song by Status Quo from Rockin' All Over the World
