= Teddy Bishop (music producer) =

American producer, songwriter, and multi-instrumentalist

Teddy Alexander Bishop
- Also known as: Stylez, Ted
- Origin: Detroit, Michigan, United States
- Genres: R&B, soul, hip-hop
- Occupations: Songwriter; producer; multi-instrumentalist
- Years active: 1990-Present
- Labels: Arista; LaFace Records
- Formerly of: Tim & Ted

Teddy Bishop is an American R&B producer, songwriter, and multi-instrumentalist best known for writing and/or producing hits "Let's Ride", "Just Be a Man About It", "Miss You", and "Torn", among others. Bishop's various productions cross genre lines, and the albums his contributions are housed on have reportedly sold more than 60 million copies worldwide.

In the early 1990s, Bishop was mentored by notable musician-turned label executive Antonio "LA Reid" Reid, who signed him to a production deal under his Atlanta-based label LaFace Records. As one half of production duo Tim & Ted (with fellow musician Tim Thomas), one of his first commissioned projects was Toni Braxton's 1993 multi-platinum eponymous debut album, on which he contributed album cut "Love Affair", and played keyboard on key hit "Another Sad Love Song". Bishop also co-produced and co-wrote debut single "Call Me a Mack" alongside new LaFace signee Usher for the 1993 Poetic Justice Soundtrack. These appearances resulted in requests to work with many other artists under the Sony Music Entertainment umbrella and in the greater Atlanta area, including 4 contributions to gospel act Dawkins & Dawkins' 1994 second album Necessary Measures, "Sexy Day" for LaFace signees A Few Good Men, and vocal arrangements for Bobby Brown & Whitney Houston duet "Something In Common". Bishop later became a mentor for songwriter-producer Bryan-Michael Cox, who had moved to Atlanta from Houston, Texas, as a young songwriter looking for music industry experience.

== Selected songwriting and production credits ==
Credits are courtesy of Discogs, Tidal, Spotify, and AllMusic.

Title	Year	Artist	Album	Label
"Call Me a Mack"	1993	Usher	Poetic Justice OST	Epic Soundtrax
"Love Affair"	1993	Toni Braxton	Toni Braxton	Arista | LaFace Records
"Let's Ride" (featuring Master P & Silkk the Shocker)	1998	Montell Jordan	Let's Ride	Def Jam Recordings
"I Can Do That"	1998	Montell Jordan	Let's Ride	Def Jam Recordings
"Kissing You"	1998	Color Me Badd	Awakening	Epic Records
"Heat" (with Cha Cha & Kelly Price)	1998	Absoulute	Hav Plenty OST	550 | Sony Music Soundtrax
"All Nite All Day"/"Interlude"	1999	Ginuwine	100% Ginuwine	550 | Epic Records
"Hot"	1999	Toni Estes	Next Friday OST	Priority Records
"If My Man Finds Out"	1999	Shae Jones	Talk Show	Universal Records
"Things You Can't Do"	1999	Ideal	Ideal	Virgin Records
"There's No Way"	1999	Ideal	Ideal	Virgin Records
"Round and Round"	1999	Dave Hollister	Ghetto Hymns	DreamWorks Records
"If This Is Love Again"	1999	Men of Vizion	MOV	MJJ Music | The WORK Group
"Too Shady" (featuring Cha Cha)	1999	Profyle	Whispers in the Dark	Motown
"Don't Be Trippin'"	1999	Profyle	Whispers in the Dark	Motown
"Somebody Like Me"	1999	Profyle	Whispers in the Dark	Motown
"He Likes" (featuring Jagged Edge)	1999	Cha Cha	Dear Diary	Epic Records
"Lace You"	2000	Jagged Edge	J.E. Heartbreak	So So Def | Columbia Records
"No Trickin'" (featuring Rasheeda)	2000	Profyle	Nothin' but Drama	Motown
"Just Be a Man About It"	2000	Toni Braxton	The Heat	LaFace Records
"You've Been Wrong"	2000	Toni Braxton	The Heat	LaFace Records
"No Doubt"	2001	Nivea	Nivea	Jive Records
"Miss You"	2002	Aaliyah	I Care 4 U	Blackground | Universal Music Group
"All I Need"	2002	Aaliyah	I Care 4 U	Blackground | Universal Music Group
"My Love" (featuring Bobby Brown)	2002	Whitney Houston	Just Whitney	Arista | BMG
"Betcha She"	2003	702	Star	Motown
"I Don't Wanna Hurt You"	2003	Latif	Love in the First	Motown
"This Way"	2004	Lloyd	Southside	The Inc | Island Def Jam
"Crush On You"	2005	Mistah F.A.B.	Son of a Pimp	Thizz Entertainment
"Torn"	2006	LeToya Luckett	LeToya	Capitol Records
"So Special"	2006	LeToya Luckett	LeToya	Capitol Records
"DUI (80 on the Freeway)"	2008	Sterling Simms	Yours, Mine & The Truth	Disturbing tha Peace

== Awards and nominations ==
Year	Ceremony	Award	Result	Ref
2001	BMI Urban Music Awards	Award-Winning Songs ("Just Be a Man About It")	Won	
2004	BMI Urban Music Awards	Award-Winning Songs ("Miss You")	Won	
2004	BMI Pop Music Awards	Award-Winning Songs ("Miss You")	Won	
