= This Is Who I Am =

This Is Who I Am may refer to:

- "This Is Who I Am" (song), a 2009 CD single by Vanessa Amorosi
- "This Is Who I Am", a 2008 song by Third Day from Revelation
- "This Is Who I Am", a song by Michael Learns to Rock from the 2004 album Michael Learns to Rock
- This Is Who I Am (Heather Headley album), 2002
- This Is Who I Am, a 2002 album by Jody McBrayer
- This Is Who I Am (Salem Al Fakir album), 2007
- This Is Who I Am (Kelly Price album), 2006
- This Is Who I Am (Lena Katina album), 2014
