= We Can't Be Friends =

1999 single by Deborah Cox

Single by Deborah Cox and RL

from the album One Wish
- Released: June 21, 1999
- Length: 4:41
- Label: Arista
- Songwriters: Shep Crawford; Jimmy Russell
- Producer: Shep Crawford

Deborah Cox singles chronology
"It's Over Now" (1999)	"We Can't Be Friends" (1999)	"I Never Knew" (2000)

R.L. singles chronology
"We Can't Be Friends" (1999)	"The Best Man I Can Be" (1999)

"We Can't Be Friends" is a song by Canadian singer Deborah Cox featuring American singer RL of R&B group Next. It was written by Shep Crawford and Jimmy Russell for Cox's second studio album, One Wish (1998), while production was overseen by Crawford. Selected as the album's third single, the duet was serviced to US urban radio on June 21, 1999, and became Cox's second single to top the Billboard Hot R&B Singles & Tracks chart. It also peaked at number eight on the Billboard Hot 100.

== Critical reception ==
Chuck Taylor from Billboard wrote that "Cox shows off the full maturity of her magnificent voice in this shimmering R&B ballad, which she shares with the equally compelling R.L. from Next. From the start, this beautifully crafted song of regret and abiding love glides along with the gentle touch of silk, raising the emotional threshold at the mid-section, where the pair’s voices rally together as if made for each other." He found that "while Cox has certainly delivered the goods on the classic 'Things Just Ain't the Same' and 'Nobody's Supposed to Be Here,' this casts her in a completely new light, which R&B and R&B adult stations will eagerly savor with all the intensity of the emotion shared here. This is indeed the goods."

== Charts ==
=== Weekly charts ===
Weekly chart performance for "We Can't Be Friends"
Chart (1999)	Peak position
Canada Adult Contemporary (RPM)	46
US Billboard Hot 100	8
US Hot R&B/Hip-Hop Songs (Billboard)	1

=== Year-end charts ===
Year-end chart performance for "We Can't Be Friends"
Chart (1999)	Position
US Hot R&B/Hip-Hop Singles & Tracks (Billboard)	23

== Certifications ==
Certifications for "We Can't Be Friends"
Region	Certification	Certified units/sales
United States (RIAA)	Gold	500,000^{*}
^{*} Sales figures based on certification alone.

== See also ==
- List of Hot R&B Singles & Tracks number ones of 1999
