= Talk Show (Shae Jones album) =

Studio album by Shae Jones
- Released: January 26, 1999
- Genre: R&B
- Label: Universal
- Producer: Montell Jordan (also exec.)

Professional ratings
Review scores
Source	Rating
AllMusic	4/5 stars

Talk Show is the only studio album by American singer Shae Jones. It was released on January 26, 1999, through Universal Records. The album featured heavy input from Shep Crawford and Jones' mentor Montell Jordan, who served as an executive producer, producer, songwriter, arranger and provided background vocals for the album. The album failed to chart on the Billboard 200, only debuting on Billboard's R&B and Heatseekers album charts.

Shae was originally Montell's background singer, and did studio work and demos for him. After signing a record deal with Universal Records (now Republic Records), she began recording and completed her debut album in 1998.

The lead single, "Talk Show Shhh!", was released in October 1998, and peaked at number 88 on the Billboard Hot 100, and number 17 on Billboard's Hot R&B Singles chart, staying on the chart for 20 weeks. The follow-up single from the album, “Bad Boy” (featuring Ja Rule), released in April 1999, topped Billboard's Bubbling Under Hot R&B Singles chart. "Everytime" was released as the third and final single in September 1999, and managed to peak at number 33 on the US Adult R&B Airplay chart, as well as number 11 on Billboard's Bubbling Under Hot R&B Singles chart.

== Track listing ==
Talk Show — Standard edition
No.	Title	Writer(s)	Length
1.	"Bad Boy" (featuring Ja Rule)	Jeffrey Atkins; Nazir Assad; Danny Nixon	3:51
2.	"Real Man"	Daniels; Montell Jordan; Nixon	3:57
3.	"You Turn Me On"	S. Abdullah; H. Clayton; Shep Crawford; Jordan; Jimmy Russell	4:23
4.	"I Want to Stay"	Crawford; Daniels; Shae Jones; Nixon; Eric Seats	3:32
5.	"If My Man Finds Out"	Teddy Bishop; Jordan	3:55
6.	"Bathroom" (Interlude)	Jordan	1:29
7.	"Talk Show (Remix)" (featuring Cha Cha)	Crawford; Parris Fluellen; Herbie Hancock; Jordan	3:56
8.	"Let Him Go"	Jordan; Nixon	3:49
9.	"Everytime"	James Banks; Crawford; Jordan; Eddie Marion; Henderson Thigpen	4:19
10.	"Bedroom" (Interlude)	Crawford; Russell; Seats	1:29
11.	"Talk Show SHHH!"	Crawford; Jordan	4:12
12.	"Symptoms of a Heartbreak"	Crawford; Daniels; Jones; Jordan	4:13
13.	"Him & You"	Nixon; Kelly Price	5:14
14.	"Hold On"	Crawford; Jones; Jordan	4:09

== Charts ==
Chart (1999)	Peak position
US Heatseekers Albums (Billboard)	16
US Top R&B/Hip-Hop Albums (Billboard)	43
