= List of number-one R&B singles of 1998 (U.S.) =

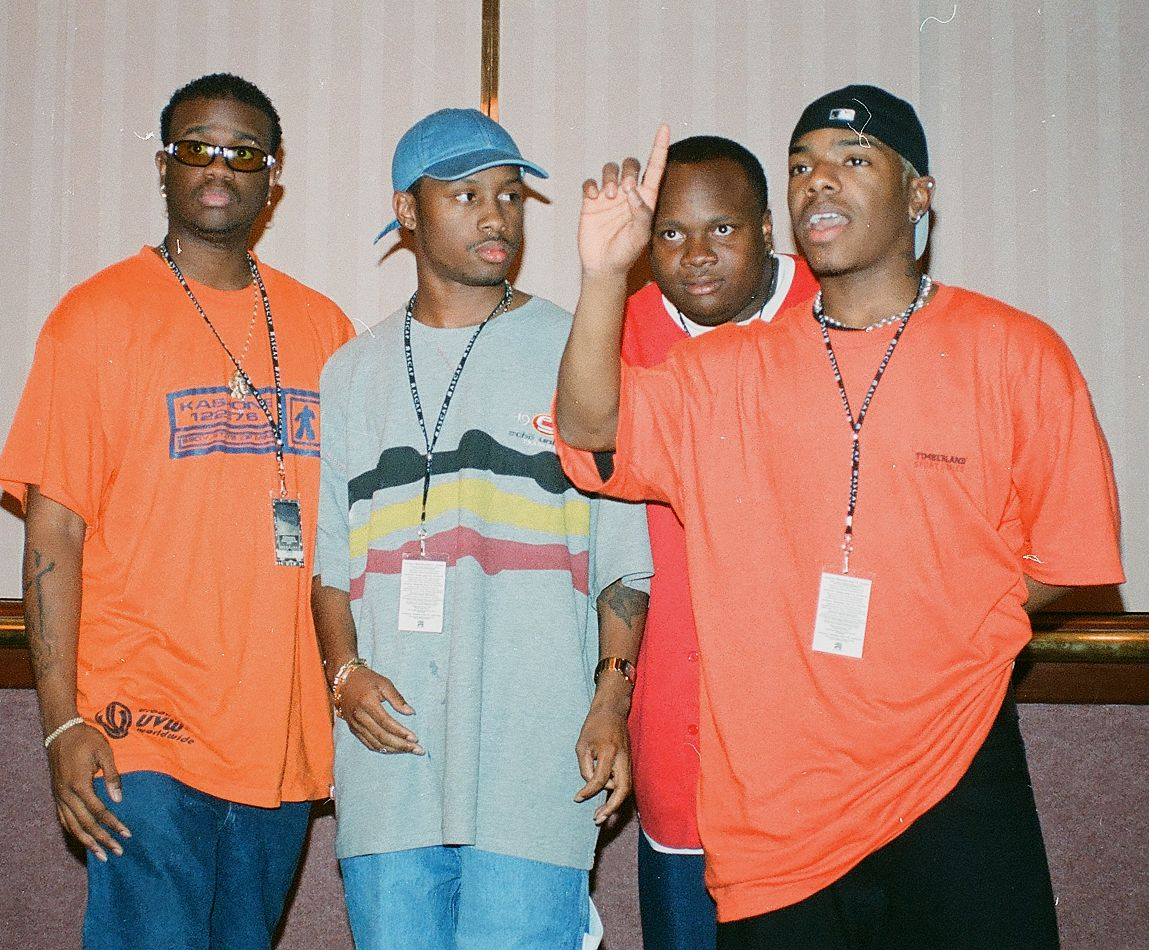
"How Deep Is Your Love" was a chart-topper for Dru Hill.

These are the Billboard magazine R&B singles chart number one hits of 1998

== Chart history ==
Key
†	Indicates best-charting R&B single of 1998

Issue date	Song	Artist
January 3	"A Song for Mama"	Boyz II Men
January 10	"My Body"	LSG
January 17	"My Body"	LSG
January 24	"Nice and Slow"	Usher
January 31	"Nice and Slow"	Usher
February 7	"Nice and Slow"	Usher
February 14	"Nice and Slow"	Usher
February 21	"Nice and Slow"	Usher
February 28	"Nice and Slow"	Usher
March 7	"Nice and Slow"	Usher
March 14	"Nice and Slow"	Usher
March 21	"No, No, No"	Destiny's Child
March 28	"Let's Ride"	Montell Jordan featuring Master P and Silkk the Shocker
April 4	"All My Life"	K-Ci & JoJo
April 11	"All My Life"	K-Ci & JoJo
April 18	"Let's Ride"	Montell Jordan featuring Master P and Silkk the Shocker
April 25	"Let's Ride"	Montell Jordan featuring Master P and Silkk the Shocker
May 2	"Too Close" †	Next
May 9	"Too Close" †	Next
May 16	"Too Close" †	Next
May 23	"I Get Lonely"	Janet and Blackstreet
May 30	"I Get Lonely"	Janet and Blackstreet
June 6	"The Boy Is Mine"	Brandy and Monica
June 13	"The Boy Is Mine"	Brandy and Monica
June 20	"The Boy Is Mine"	Brandy and Monica
June 27	"The Boy Is Mine"	Brandy and Monica
July 4	"The Boy Is Mine"	Brandy and Monica
July 11	"The Boy Is Mine"	Brandy and Monica
July 18	"The Boy Is Mine"	Brandy and Monica
July 25	"The Boy Is Mine"	Brandy and Monica
August 1	"Friend of Mine"	Kelly Price
August 8	"Friend of Mine"	Kelly Price
August 15	"Friend of Mine"	Kelly Price
August 22	"Friend of Mine"	Kelly Price
August 29	"Friend of Mine"	Kelly Price
September 5	"The First Night"	Monica
September 12	"The First Night"	Monica
September 19	"The First Night"	Monica
September 26	"The First Night"	Monica
October 3	"The First Night"	Monica
October 10	"The First Night"	Monica
October 17	"How Deep Is Your Love"	Dru Hill featuring Redman
October 24	"How Deep Is Your Love"	Dru Hill featuring Redman
October 31	"How Deep Is Your Love"	Dru Hill featuring Redman
November 7	"Nobody's Supposed to Be Here"	Deborah Cox
November 14	"Nobody's Supposed to Be Here"	Deborah Cox
November 21	"Nobody's Supposed to Be Here"	Deborah Cox
November 28	"Nobody's Supposed to Be Here"	Deborah Cox
December 5	"Nobody's Supposed to Be Here"	Deborah Cox
December 12	"Nobody's Supposed to Be Here"	Deborah Cox
December 19	"Nobody's Supposed to Be Here"	Deborah Cox
December 26	"Nobody's Supposed to Be Here"	Deborah Cox

=== Chart comparisons ===
- Five songs reached number-one on the Billboard Hot 100/pop chart: "Nice and Slow," "All My Life," "Too Close," "The Boy Is Mine" and "The First Night."
- Five songs reached number-one on the Rhythmic chart: "Nice and Slow," "All My Life," "Too Close," "The Boy Is Mine" and "How Deep Is Your Love." "You Make Me Wanna..." topped the chart from last year.

== See also ==
- 1998 in music
- Billboard Year-End Hot R&B Singles of 1998
- List of number-one R&B hits (United States)
- List of number-one R&B albums of 1998 (U.S.)
