= Harvester (American band) =

- Origin: California, United States
- Genres: Indie
- Years active: 1993-present
- Labels: Lather Records

See also Harvester (disambiguation)

Harvester was formed in 1993 by Sean Harrasser. Originally a loose ensemble, the band eventually settled into with Jed Brewer on guitar, Todd Steinberg on bass, and Kelly Bauman on drums. After several independent releases, the band attracted interest from Geffen Records in 1995, and was signed after a memorable performance a mile below ground in a closed gold mine. Their major-label debut album Me Climb Mountain was released in 1996.

Bauman departed the band in 1996 to focus on his other band, Deathstar, and was replaced by Jon Sebat. The band recorded another album for Geffen but was unceremoniously dropped before it could be released. The recordings were released later that year as "Camper van Landingham." Since 1999, the band members have been scattered across the globe, but still reunite for the occasional album and anniversary show.

== Discography ==
Full Lengths

- Me Climb Mountain (1996)
- Camper van Landingham (1997)
- Mud Is My Ally (1999)
- "Annoying The Waitress" (2001)

EPs

- "Northstate EP" (1995)
- "Congratulations On Your Nudity (1997)
- "Kentucky Fried Roberta Bus" (2006)

Singles

- Low Fi Soccer Camp (1994)
- Agri-Rock w/ Chance the Gardner (1994)

Compilations

- The Furious Swampriders (2000)
- This Week In Science (2006)
