= In My Mind (Heather Headley song) =

Single by Heather Headley

from the album In My Mind
- Released: September 27, 2005
- Genre: Soul; R&B
- Length: 4:05
- Label: RCA
- Songwriters: Shannon Sanders; Drew Ramsey
- Producer: Shannon Sanders

Heather Headley singles chronology
| "I Wish I Wasn't" (2003) | "In My Mind" (2005) | "Me Time" (2006) |

"In My Mind" is a song by Trinidadian-American artist Heather Headley from her second studio album, In My Mind (2006). The song is a cover from American recording artist Shannon Sanders from his debut studio album, Outta Nowhere (1999). It was released on September 27, 2005 as the album's lead single, peaking at number seventy-five on the Billboard Hot 100 in early April 2006, while the song's remixes by the Freemasons and Dave Hernandez topped the Hot Dance Club Play.

Headley's version of the track appeared on the April 20, 2008 episode of the comedy-drama television series The Game, titled "Bury My Heart at Wounded Knee". In 2021, Headley's version was sampled by Nicki Minaj, Drake and Lil Wayne for the song "Seeing Green", from the reissue of Minaj's 2009 mixtape Beam Me Up Scotty.

== Music video ==
The music video for "In My Mind" was directed by Diane Martel and premiered on January 19, 2006 via Yahoo! The video opens with Headley at home at dawn, lying on a couch, in the kitchen, and watching television, intercut with scenes of her watching her ex-boyfriend kissing another girl across the street. Next, the video switches in and out of Headley singing and talking to her ex-boyfriend's mother, who hugs her near the end of the second verse. She is shown walking with her ex, and as the bridge begins, a tear falls from her eye. As the song progresses, Headley is seen singing and holding the boyfriend, switching into scenes where she is standing in place, singing.

== Track listings ==
=== US digital EP ===
1. "In My Mind" (Freemasons Vocal Club Mix) – 7:41
2. "In My Mind" (Freemasons Vocal Dub Mix) – 6:40
3. "In My Mind" (Dave Hernandez Club Mix) – 7:05
4. "In My Mind" (Dave Hernandez Dub Mix One) – 7:14

=== US digital EP (Dance Vault Mixes) ===
1. "In My Mind" (Freemasons Radio Mix) – 3:50
2. "In My Mind" (Freemasons Vocal Club Mix) – 7:41
3. "In My Mind" (Freemasons Dub Mix) – 6:40
4. "In My Mind" (Freemasons Club Instrumental) – 7:41
5. "In My Mind" (Freemasons Club Acappella) – 5:14
6. "In My Mind" (Dave Hernandez Club Mix) – 7:05
7. "In My Mind" (Dave Hernandez Dub Mix One) – 7:14
8. "In My Mind" (Dave Hernandez Dub Mix Two) – 7:14
9. "In My Mind" (Dave Hernandez Radio Mix) – 4:00
10. "In My Mind" – 4:06

== Personnel ==
Credits adapted from the liner notes of In My Mind.

- Heather Headley – vocals
- John Catchings – strings
- David Davidson – strings
- Greg Fuqua – engineering
- Serban Ghenea – mixing
- Jon Graves – engineering
- John Hanes – additional Pro Tools
- Mark Linger – engineering
- Dan Needham – drums
- Drew Ramsey – backing vocals, engineering, guitar, production
- Tim Roberts – additional Pro Tools assistance
- Shannon Sanders – backing vocals, keyboards, production
- Tommy Sims – bass
- Debreca Smith – backing vocals
- Bill Whittington – engineering
- Kristin Wilkinson – strings

== Charts ==
=== Weekly charts ===
| Chart (2006) | Peak position |
|---|---|
| US Billboard Hot 100 | 75 |
| US Dance Club Songs (Billboard) | 1 |
| US Hot R&B/Hip-Hop Songs (Billboard) | 16 |

=== Year-end charts ===
| Chart (2006) | Position |
|---|---|
| US Dance Club Songs (Billboard) | 29 |
| US Hot R&B/Hip-Hop Songs (Billboard) | 30 |

== Release history ==
| Region | Date | Format | Label | Ref. |
|---|---|---|---|---|
| United States | September 27, 2005 | Digital download | RCA | |
| United States | September 27, 2005 | Urban AC radio | RCA | |
| United States | December 27, 2005 | Digital EP | RCA | |
| United States | January 10, 2006 | Urban radio | RCA | |
| United States | April 18, 2006 | Digital EP (Dance Vault Mixes) | RCA | |

== See also ==
- List of number-one dance singles of 2006 (U.S.)
