= It's Over Now (Deborah Cox song) =

1999 single by Deborah Cox

Single by Deborah Cox

from the album One Wish
- Released: March 15, 1999
- Length: 3:43
- Label: Arista
- Songwriters: Keir "KayGee" Gist; Taura Stinson; Alonzo Jackson; DeMone Griffin
- Producers: Alonzo Jackson; KayGee

Deborah Cox singles chronology
"Nobody's Supposed to Be Here" (1998)	"It's Over Now" (1999)	"We Can't Be Friends" (1999)

"It's Over Now" is a song by Canadian singer Deborah Cox. It was written by Keir "KayGee" Gist, Taura Stinson, Alonzo Jackson, and DeMone Griffin for Cox's second studio album, One Wish (1998), while production was overseen by KayGee and Jackson. Released as the album's second following the success of "Nobody's Supposed to Be Here", it peaking at number 20 on the US Billboard Hot R&B Singles & Tracks chart while becoming her third consecutive number-one hit on the Billboard Dance Club Play chart.

== Charts ==
=== Weekly charts ===
Chart (1999)	Peak position
UK Singles (OCC)	49
UK Dance (OCC)	12
UK Hip Hop/R&B (OCC)	11
US Billboard Hot 100	70
US Dance Club Songs (Billboard)	1
US Dance Singles Sales (Billboard)	5
US Hot R&B/Hip-Hop Songs (Billboard)	20

=== Year-end charts ===
Chart (1999)	Position
US Dance Club Play (Billboard)	18
US Maxi-Singles Sales (Billboard)	17

== Release history ==
Region	Date	Format(s)	Label(s)	Ref.
United States	March 15, 1999	Urban radio	Arista	
United Kingdom	July 19, 1999	12-inch vinyl; CD; cassette	Arista; BMG	

== Samplings ==
The song has been sampled several times, including "It's Over Now" by Big Ang featuring Siobhan in 2003, "Watchin'" by Freemasons in 2006, and "Lies" by Burns in 2012.
