= In My Mind (Heather Headley album) =

Studio album by Heather Headley
- Released: January 31, 2006
- Recorded: 2005
- Genre: R&B
- Length: 45:29
- Label: RCA
- Producer: Stephen Ferrera (also exec.); Babyface; Warryn Campbell; Carvin & Ivan; Shep Crawford; Drew and Shannon; John Frye; The Heavyweights; Jimmy Jam and Terry Lewis; Sixx John; Anthony Kelly; Lil Jon; Steven Marsden; Ne-Yo; Gregg Pagani; Ro; Sauce; James "Big Jim" Wright

Heather Headley chronology
This Is Who I Am (2002)	In My Mind (2006)	Audience of One (2009)

In My Mind is the second studio album by Trinidadian-American singer Heather Headley. It was first released by RCA Records on January 31, 2006 in the United States. The album was delayed due to the Sony BMG merger, and Headley jokingly stated that it should be titled Caught Up. Headley worked with a variety of high-profile R&B and hip hop producers such as Jimmy Jam & Terry Lewis, Ne-Yo, Warryn Campbell, and Lil Jon on the album. In My Mind debuted at number five on the US Billboard 200 and number one on the Billboard Top R&B/Hip-Hop Albums with first-week sales of 95,000 copies. On May 17, 2006, the Recording Industry Association of America (RIAA) certified the album gold for shipments of 500,000 units within the United States.

== Critical reception ==
Professional ratings
Review scores
Source	Rating
Allmusic	4/5 stars
PopMatters	5/10 stars
Rolling Stone	2.5/5 stars
Slant	2.5/5 stars

In his review for Allmusic, editor Andy Kellman wrote that "fans of mature R&B who were won over by Heather Headley's 2002 debut, This Is Who I Am, will hear much to like in her follow-up. Headley by and large proceeds with an "If it ain't broke, don't fix it" policy. She does sound more assured, which only works to her advantage with the mostly elegant and very musical set of arrangements that she fronts. Though the hooks aren't as immediate as what can be heard on Top 40 radio, the relationship insights and the manner in which they're compellingly conveyed are more than a fair trade-off." Mike Joseph from PopMatters found that "hearing love song after cheating song after being cheated on song makes In My Mind the textbook definition of a generic 'adult' R&B diva album [...] The problem that plagues Headley is the same problem that has plagued many an R&B singer over tim: She's only as good as her material lets her be."

== Track listing ==
No.	Title	Writer(s)	Producer(s)	Length
1.	"In My Mind"	Shannon Sanders; Drew Ramsey	Drew and Shannon	4:05
2.	"Am I Worth It"	Warryn Campbell; Joi Campbell; John Smith	Campbell	3:21
3.	"Wait a Minute"	Shep Crawford; Jazz Nixon; Tamara Savage	Crawford	3:31
4.	"I Didn't Mean To"	Shaffer Smith; Sixx Johnson; Artie Butler; Karen Philipp	Ne-Yo; John; Sauce	3:54
5.	"How Many Ways" (featuring Vybz Kartel)	Headley; Steven Marsden; Adidja Palmer; LaShawn Daniels; Karla Ellie; Eileen "Sky" Santiago; Credric Solomon	Marsden	3:17
6.	"Back When It Was"	Johnta Austin; Jonathan Smith; Craig Love; Larry Nix; LaMarquis Jefferson	John Frye; Lil Jon	4:26
7.	"What's Not Being Said"	James Harris III; Terry Lewis; James Wright	Jimmy Jam and Terry Lewis; Wright^{[a]}	4:34
8.	"Losing You"	Headley; Carvin Haggins; Ivan Barias; Johnnie Smith; Phillip Jackson	Carvin & Ivan	3:47
9.	"Rain" (featuring Shaggy)	Headley; Vada Nobles; Orville Burrell; Maurice Gregory; Anthony Kelly	Kelly	3:12
10.	"The Letter"	Smith; Marcus Allen; Melvin Sparkman; Curtis Wilson; Rochad Holiday	Ne-Yo; Sauce; Ro; The Heavy Weights	4:16
11.	"Me Time"	Kenneth Edmonds; Clarence Allen; Gregg Pagani	Babyface; Pagani	3:48
12.	"Change"	Headley; W. Campbell; Eric Dawkins	Campbell	3:18

Notes

- ^a signifies an additional producer

Samples

- "I Didn't Mean To" contains samples from Helen Reddy's "I Didn't Mean to Love You", written by Artie Butler, and Karen Philipp.

== Charts ==
=== Weekly charts ===
Chart (2006)	Peak position
US Billboard 200	5
US Top R&B/Hip-Hop Albums (Billboard)	1

=== Year-end charts ===
Chart (2006)	Position
US Billboard 200	122
US Top R&B/Hip-Hop Albums (Billboard)	14

== Certifications ==
Region	Certification	Certified units/sales
United States (RIAA)	Gold	500,000^{^}
^{^} Shipments figures based on certification alone.

== Release history ==
List of release dates, showing region, editions and label
Region	Date	Edition(s)	Label
United States	January 31, 2006	CD; digital download	RCA Records
United Kingdom	May 29, 2006	CD; digital download	RCA Records
