= Get It On Tonite =

1999 single by Montell Jordan

Single by Montell Jordan

from the album Get It On...Tonite
- B-side: "Get It On with LL & Montell"; "Once Upon a Time"
- Released: September 28, 1999
- Length: 4:37
- Label: Def Soul
- Songwriters: Montell Jordan; Brian Palmer; Sergio Moore; Darren Benbow; Levar A. Wilson; Jörg Evers; Jürgen Korduletsch
- Producers: Sergio "PLX" Moore; Brian "Lil Bee" Palmer

Montell Jordan singles chronology
"I Can Do That" (1998)	"Get It On Tonite" (1999)	"Once Upon a Time" (2000)

"Get It On Tonite" is the lead single released from American singer turned pastor Montell Jordan's fourth album, Get It On...Tonite (1999). The song was originally performed by Derrick Dimitry, whose version was released in 1997 through the short-lived Freeworld Entertainment label. However, after the label shut down, the song was eventually given to Jordan. Produced by Brian "Lil Bee" Palmer and Sergio "PLX" Moore, the song utilizes a sample of Claudja Barry's 1976 single "Love for the Sake of Love".

"Get It On Tonite" reached number four on the US Billboard Hot 100, becoming Jordan's last solo single to chart on the Hot 100. It also spent three consecutive weeks at number one on the Hot R&B/Hip-Hop Singles & Tracks chart and sold 800,000 copies domestically. A remix entitled "Get It On with LL and Montell", which features labelmate LL Cool J, was included on several formats of the single.

== Samplings ==
In July 2012, "Get It On Tonite" was sampled on Harlem rapper Azealia Banks's first mixtape, Fantasea, on the penultimate track "Esta Noche". Pitchfork Media's Marc Hogan praised the track, saying that "the best and penultimate cut on Fantasea, "Esta Noche", points in a promising new direction: conversational, cheater-luring pickup lines over a warmly inviting sample from Montell Jordan's 1999 R&B hit "Get It on Tonite". Critics praised producer Munchi's fusion of electronic dance music and R&B, with the track being named as a highlight of the tape.

== Track listings ==
US CD and cassette single

1. "Get It On Tonite" (LP version) – 4:16
2. "Get It On with LL & Montell" (with LL Cool J) – 3:47
3. "Once Upon a Time" (LP version) – 4:36

US 12-inch single

A1. "Get It On Tonite" (radio edit)
A2. "Get It On Tonite" (LP version)
B1. "Get It On Tonite" (instrumental)
B2. "Get It On Tonite" (acappella)

UK CD1

1. "Get It On Tonite" (radio edit)
2. "This Is How We Do It" (Puff Daddy radio mix)
3. "Somethin' 4 da Honeyz" (radio version)
4. "Get It On Tonite" (video)

UK CD2

1. "Get It On with LL & Montell" (radio edit with LL Cool J)
2. "This Is How We Do It" (Funkmaster Flex radio mix)
3. "I Like" (radio edit)

European CD single

1. "Get It On Tonite"
2. "Maybe She Will"

European maxi-CD single

1. "Get It On Tonite"
2. "Maybe She Will"
3. "Get It On Tonite" (instrumental)
4. "Get It On Tonite" (video)

== Charts ==
=== Weekly charts ===
Chart (1999–2000)	Peak position
Belgium (Ultratop 50 Flanders)	18
Belgium (Ultratop 50 Wallonia)	11
Canada Top Singles (RPM)	15
Canada Adult Contemporary (RPM)	85
Europe (Eurochart Hot 100)	24
France (SNEP)	28
Germany (GfK)	21
Netherlands (Dutch Top 40)	9
Netherlands (Single Top 100)	8
New Zealand (Recorded Music NZ)	43
Scottish Singles Sales (Official Charts)	49
Switzerland (Schweizer Hitparade)	14
UK Singles (Official Charts)	15
UK Hip Hop/R&B (Official Charts)	3
US Billboard Hot 100	4
US Hot R&B/Hip-Hop Singles & Tracks (Billboard)	1
US Mainstream Top 40 (Billboard)	19
US Maxi-Singles Sales (Billboard)	8
US Rhythmic Top 40 (Billboard)	4

=== Year-end charts ===
Chart (2000)	Position
Belgium (Ultratop 50 Flanders)	92
Belgium (Ultratop 50 Wallonia)	53
France (SNEP)	86
Netherlands (Dutch Top 40)	28
Netherlands (Single Top 100)	55
Switzerland (Schweizer Hitparade)	99
US Billboard Hot 100	24
US Hot R&B/Hip-Hop Singles & Tracks (Billboard)	6
US Mainstream Top 40 (Billboard)	73
US Rhythmic Top 40 (Billboard)	22

== Certifications ==
Region	Certification	Certified units/sales
New Zealand (RMNZ)	Gold	15,000^{‡}
United Kingdom (BPI)	Silver	200,000^{‡}
United States (RIAA)	Gold	800,000
^{‡} Sales+streaming figures based on certification alone.

== Release history ==
Region	Date	Format(s)	Label(s)	Ref(s).
United States	September 28, 1999	Urban; urban AC radio	Def Soul	
United States	November 9, 1999	12-inch vinyl; CD	Def Soul	
United States	November 16, 1999	Contemporary hit radio	Def Soul	
New Zealand	December 13, 1999	CD	Def Soul	
United Kingdom	March 27, 2000	CD	Def Soul; Mercury	
