= I Can Do That (Montell Jordan song) =

Single by Montell Jordan

from the album Let's Ride
- Released: June 30, 1998
- Recorded: 1998
- Genre: R&B
- Length: 4:44
- Label: Def Jam
- Songwriter(s): Montell Jordan
- Producer(s): Teddy Bishop

Montell Jordan singles chronology
"Let's Ride" (1998)	"I Can Do That" (1998)	"Get It On Tonite" (1999)

"I Can Do That" is the second single released from Montell Jordan's third album, Let's Ride. Produced by Teddy Bishop, the song became the album's second consecutive hit, peaking at 14 on the Billboard Hot 100. It was certified gold by the RIAA for sales of 500,000 copies, becoming his final single to achieve that feat. The "I Can Do That" single was released with three remixes of his previous single, "Let's Ride".

== Single track listing ==
=== A-Side ===
1. "I Can Do That" (Radio Edit)
2. "Let's Ride" (Dutch Factory Remix)
3. "Let's Ride" (Dave Mazee's Wicked Mix)
4. "Let's Ride" (Super Jupiter Lectro Mix)

=== B-Side ===
1. "I Can Do That" (Instrumental)
2. "Let's Ride" (Dutch Factory Remix) (TV track)
3. "Let's Ride" (Dave Mazee's Wicked Mix) (TV Track)
4. "Let's Ride" (Super Jupiter Lectro Mix) (Instrumental)

== Charts and certifications ==
=== Weekly charts ===
Chart (1998)	Peak position
US Billboard Hot 100	14
US Hot R&B/Hip-Hop Songs (Billboard)	4

=== Year-end charts ===
Chart (1998)	Position
US Hot R&B/Hip-Hop Songs (Billboard)	67

=== Certifications ===
Region	Certification	Certified units/sales
United States (RIAA)	Gold	500,000
