= Kelly (Kelly Price album) =

Studio album by Kelly Price
- Released: May 3, 2011
- Genre: R&B
- Length: 45:27
- Labels: My Block; Malaco
- Producers: Warryn Campbell; Shep Crawford; Jazz Nixon; Lawrence Waddell; Stokley Williams

Kelly Price chronology
This Is Who I Am (2006)	Kelly (2011)	Sing Pray Love, Vol. 1: Sing (2014)

Singles from Kelly
- 1. "Tired" Released: August 10, 2010; 2. "Not My Daddy" Released: March 8, 2011; 3. "Himaholic" Released: August 2011

Kelly is the sixth studio album by American R&B singer-songwriter Kelly Price. It was released by My Block Records and Malaco Records on May 3, 2011. The album was preceded by the release of three singles, "Tired", "Not My Daddy" (featuring Stokley Williams) and "Himaholic".

== Promotion ==
"Tired" was released to iTunes as the lead single on August 17, 2010. On September 4, 2010, "Tired" debuted at number 29 on the Billboard Adult R&B Songs chart. The following week the song peaked at 26 on September 4, 2010, and spent 3 weeks on the chart. On September 18, 2010, the song debuted at number 87 on the Hot R&B/Hip-Hop Songs chart. The following week the song peaked at number 82 on September 25, 2011, and spent 6 weeks on the chart.

"Not My Daddy" was released to iTunes as the second single on March 8, 2011. On May 21, 2011, "Not My Daddy" debuted at number 6 on the Billboard Adult R&B Songs chart and spent 21 weeks on the chart. On May 21, 2011, the song debuted at number 85 on Billboard Radio Songs chart. On June 11, 2011, the song debuted at number 29 on the R&B/Hip-Hop Airplay chart. The following week the song peaked at number 22 on June 18, 2011, and spent 18 weeks on the chart.

"Himaholic" was released as the album's third and final single in August 2011. On August 20, 2011, the song debuted at number 69 on the R&B/Hip-Hop Airplay chart. The song debuted at number 91 on Hot R&B/Hip-Hop Songs chart. The following week the song peaked at number 69 on August 20, 2011, and spent 4 weeks on the chart. The song debuted at number 24 on the Billboard Adult R&B Songs chart on September 3, 2011. The following week the song peaked at number 21 on September 10, 2011, and spent 9 weeks on the chart.

== Critical reception ==
Professional ratings
Review scores
Source	Rating
About.com	4/5 stars
AllMusic	3.5/5 stars

Andy Kellman from AllMusic wrote: "Price collaborates extensively with Campbell (Mary Mary, Alicia Keys, Brandy), who comes up with some of his biggest-sounding productions in order to match her voice. The cathartic, closet-cleaning “Tired" and the following song, a club throwback based around War's "Galaxy" (with a touch of Michael Jackson's "Don't Stop 'Til You Get Enough)", are highlights, as is the relaxed "Speechless"—adroit synth-funk that recalls the early-‘80s productions of Leon Sylvers III and Prince. A handful of other producers, such as longtime Price associate Shep Crawford, contribute in smaller capacities [...] and the result sounds just like classic Mint Condition — a vibrant, almost live-sounding song filled with hooks that deserves to be one of the bigger adult R&B singles of 2011."

== Accolades ==
"Tired" was nominated for Best Female R&B Vocal Performance at the 53rd Annual Grammy Awards. "Not My Daddy" was nominated for Best R&B Performance and Best R&B Song, while the album was nominated for Best R&B Album at the 54th Annual Grammy Awards.

== Commercial performance ==
The album debuted at number 36 on the US Billboard 200, number 9 on the US Top R&B/Hip-Hop Albums chart and number 7 on the US Independent Albums chart on May 21, 2011.

== Track listing ==
Kelly track listing
No.	Title	Writer(s)	Length
1.	"Tired"	Kelly Price; Shep Crawford	3:41
2.	"And You Don't Stop"	Price; Warryn Campbell	4:11
3.	"Not My Daddy" (featuring Stokley Williams)	Price	4:28
4.	"Himaholic"	Price; Jazz Nixon	3:28
5.	"I'm Sorry"	Price; Crawford; Phillip Scott	3:22
6.	"The Rain"	Price; W. Campbell; Joi Campbell	4:59
7.	"Vexed"	Price; W. Campbell	3:08
8.	"Speechless"	Price; W. Campbell	3:31
9.	"Feels So Good"	Price; W. Campbell	3:39
10.	"You Don't Have to Worry"	Price; W. Campbell	3:36
11.	"Lil Sumn-Sumn"	Price; W. Campbell	3:31
12.	"Get Right or Get Left"	Price; W. Campbell	5:02

iTunes Store deluxe version bonus tracks
No.	Title	Writer(s)	Length
13.	"Intervention"	Price	4:12
14.	"Good for You"	Price	3:56

== Charts ==
=== Weekly charts ===
Weekly chart performance for Kelly
Chart (2011)	Peak position
US Billboard 200	36
US Independent Albums (Billboard)	7
US Top R&B/Hip-Hop Albums (Billboard)	9

=== Year-end charts ===
Year-end chart performance for Kelly
Chart (2011)	Position
US Top R&B/Hip-Hop Albums (Billboard)	82

== Release history ==
Kelly release history
Region	Date	Format	Edition(s)	Label	Ref(s)
United States	May 3, 2011	CD	Standard	My Block; Malaco	
Worldwide	May 3, 2011	Digital download	Deluxe	My Block; Malaco	
