= Things Just Ain't the Same =

Single by Deborah Cox

from the album Money Talks: The Album
- Released: May 6, 1997
- Length: 3:37
- Label: Arista
- Songwriters: Nicole Renée; Alfred Antoine; Andre Evans; Thom Bell; Linda Creed
- Producers: Alfred Antoine; Andre Evans

Deborah Cox singles chronology
"Just Be Good to Me" (1996)	"Things Just Ain't the Same" (1997)	"Nobody's Supposed to Be Here" (1998)

"Things Just Ain't the Same" is a song by Canadian singer Deborah Cox. It was written by Nicole Renée, Alfred "Bob" Antoine, and Andre Evans and recorded by Cox for the soundtrack to the comedy film Money Talks (1997), with production helmed by Antoine and Evans. The song is built around a sample of "You Are Everything" (1971) by American soul group the Stylistics. Due to the inclusion of the sample, Thom Bell and Linda Creed are also credited as songwriters. A dance remix of the song was later included on her second studio album, One Wish (1998), and was released on July 21, 1998.

== Charts ==
=== Weekly charts ===
Chart (1997)	Peak position
US Billboard Hot 100	56
US Dance Club Songs (Billboard)	1
US Dance Singles Sales (Billboard)	6
US Hot R&B/Hip-Hop Songs (Billboard)	22

=== Year-end charts ===
Chart (1997)	Position
US Hot R&B Singles (Billboard)	91
US Maxi-Singles Sales (Billboard)	20
