= Get It On...Tonite =

Get It On…Tonite

Studio album by Montell Jordan
- Released: November 9, 1999
- Recorded: 1998–1999
- Genre: R&B
- Length: 68:30
- Label: Def Soul
- Producer: Montell Jordan; JoJo Brim; Shep Crawford; Jazz the Man; Ralph Kearns; Brian "Lilz" Palmer; Sergio "PLX" Moore; K. C. Porter

Montell Jordan chronology
| Let's Ride (1998) | Get It On…Tonite (1999) | Montell Jordan (2002) |

Singles from Get It On...Tonite
- 1. "Get It On Tonite" Released: September 28, 1999

Professional ratings
Review scores
| Source | Rating |
|---|---|
| AllMusic | 3/5 stars |
| Los Angeles Times | 2/4 stars |

Get It On...Tonite is the fourth studio album by the American singer Montell Jordan. It was released by Def Jam Recordings's spin-off label Def Soul on November 9, 1999, in the United States. The production was by Jordan, Anthony "Shep" Crawford, and Jazz the Man. Another success, it peaked at number 32 on the US Billboard 200 and number 3 on the top R&B/Hip-Hop Albums. The title track found also found success on the Billboard charts, peaking at number 4 on the US Billboard Hot 100 and number 1 on the Hot R&B/Hip-Hop Singles & Tracks.

== Track listing ==
| No. | Title | Writer(s) | Producer(s) | Length |
|---|---|---|---|---|
| 1. | "Sidney Jordan (Intro)" (featuring Sidney Jordan) | | Montell Jordan | 0:12 |
| 2. | "Get It On Tonite" | Montell Jordan; Brian Palmer; Sergio Moore; Darren Benbow; Antoine Wilson; Jörg Evers; Jürgen Korduletsch | Sergio "PLX" Moore; Brian "Lilz" Palmer | 4:36 |
| 3. | "Come Home" | Jordan; JoJo Brim; Anthony Crawford; Sylvester James; Harvey Fuqua | Jordan; JoJo Brim | 3:36 |
| 4. | "Funk Flex (Interlude)" | | Jordan | 0:12 |
| 5. | "What's It Feel Like? (Is It Good?)" | Jordan; Eritza Laues; Danny Nixon; André Benjamin; Robert Barnett; Thomas Burton; Cameron Gipp; Willie Knighton; Ray Murray; Rico Wade; Patrick Brown | Jazz the Man | 4:04 |
| 6. | "Everybody (Get Down)" | Jordan; Nixon; Brim | Jazz the Man | 4:30 |
| 7. | "Can't Get Enough" | Jordan; Brim; Nixon; Stacey Daniels; Jeffrey Atkins | Jazz the Man | 3:50 |
| 8. | "Why You Wanna Do That? (Ooh Girl)" | Jordan; Laues; Nixon | Jazz the Man | 4:04 |
| 9. | "Maybe She Will" | Jordan; Brim; Ralph Kearns | Brim; Ralph Kearns | 3:36 |
| 10. | "Kevin Nash Interview (Skit)" (featuring Kevin Nash) | | Jordan | 0:57 |
| 11. | "Time to Say Goodbye" (featuring Tyler Parris) | Jordan; Crawford; Daniels | Shep Crawford | 5:16 |
| 12. | "Let's Cuddle Up" (featuring Lockdown) | Jordan | Jordan | 4:39 |
| 13. | "Do You?" | Jordan; Crawford; Kimberly Morrow | Crawford | 4:37 |
| 14. | "One Last Time (Break Up Sex)" | Jordan; Crawford | Crawford | 4:27 |
| 15. | "Last Night (Can We Move On?)" | Jordan; Kristin Hudson; Nixon | Jazz the Man | 4:37 |
| 16. | "The Interview (Skit)" | | Jordan | 1:06 |
| 17. | "Once Upon a Time" | Jordan; Crawford | Crawford | 4:36 |
| 18. | "Against All Odds" | Phil Collins | Crawford | 4:15 |
| 19. | "Habia Una Vez (Once Upon a Time)" (hidden track) | | K. C. Porter | 4:36 |

Sample credits

- "Get It On Tonite" contains elements from "Love for the Sake of Love", written by Jörg Evers and Jürgen S. Korduletsch, performed by Claudja Barry.
- "What's It Feel Like? (Is It Good?)" contains a sample from "Thought Process"; written by André Benjamin, Robert Barnett, Thomas Burton, Cameron Gipp, Willie Knighton, Ray Murray, Rico Wade, and Patrick Brown; performed by Goodie Mob.

== Charts ==
=== Weekly charts ===
| Chart (1999) | Peak position |
|---|---|
| Dutch Albums (Album Top 100) | 28 |
| German Albums (Offizielle Top 100) | 30 |
| Swiss Albums (Schweizer Hitparade) | 49 |
| UK Albums (OCC) | 174 |
| UK R&B Albums (OCC) | 21 |
| US Billboard 200 | 32 |
| US Top R&B/Hip-Hop Albums (Billboard) | 4 |

=== Year-end charts ===
| Chart (2000) | Position |
|---|---|
| US Billboard 200 | 177 |
| US Top R&B/Hip-Hop Albums (Billboard) | 55 |

== Certifications ==
| Region | Certification | Certified units/sales |
|---|---|---|
| United States (RIAA) | Gold | 500,000^{^} |
^{^} Shipments figures based on certification alone.
