= Harvester (HCI) =

Cloud computing software

- Release: September 30, 2020
- Stable release: 1.9.0 / 16 September 2026; 31 days ago
- Written in: Go
- License: Apache-2.0 license
- Website: harvesterhci.io
- Repository: github.com/harvester/harvester

Harvester is a cloud native hyper-converged infrastructure (HCI) open source software. Harvester was announced in 2020 by SUSE.

On 1 December 2020, SUSE acquired Rancher Labs who makes a product called Rancher that manages kubernetes clusters. As of v0.3.0 rancher supports integration with harvester to provide a "single pane of glass" (central web GUI) to manage both your infrastructure and workloads.

== Harvester Overview ==
=== Architecture ===
==== Bare Metal ====
Harvester is a type 1 hypervisor designed to be deployed on bare metal servers. It can be manually installed using a ISO disk or USB install, or installed over the network via a PXE Boot server such as IPXE.

==== OS ====
Harvester uses the Elemental Toolkit to create a minimal cloud-init version of SUSE Linux Enterprise Micro 5.3 to provide an immutable Linux distribution to remove as much OS maintenance as possible.

==== Virtualization ====
Kubevirt is used on top of kubernetes to provide virtualization support. This allows harvester to run virtual machines as a kubernetes workload. Harvester provides most basic features provided by other hypervisors such as ESXi, Proxmox VE and XCP-NG / Citrix XenServer. As of v1.1.0 PCI Device passing is supported as an experimental feature, allowing PCI devices on the hypervisor host to be passed directly to a VM. Devices not in use directly by the hypervisor can be used. This is useful for passing a GPU for GPU-Accelerated Computing or NVMe storage for IOPS sensitive use cases like databases.

== See also ==
- Dell EMC VxRail
- Cisco HyperFlex
- VMware
- Rancher Labs
