= Let's Ride (Montell Jordan song) =

Single by Montell Jordan featuring Master P and Silkk the Shocker

from the album Let's Ride
- B-side: "Let's Ride (Instrumental)"
- Released: February 10, 1998
- Recorded: 1997
- Length: 4:51
- Label: Def Jam
- Songwriters: Montell Jordan; Percy Miller; Vyshonn Miller
- Producer: Teddy Bishop

Montell Jordan singles chronology
"What's on Tonight" (1997)	"Let's Ride" (1998)	"I Can Do That" (1998)

Silkk the Shocker singles chronology
"Just Be Straight with Me" (1998)	"Let's Ride" (1998)	"It Ain't My Fault" (1998)

Master P singles chronology
"With Me" (1998)	"Let's Ride" (1998)	"Live or Die" (1999)

"Let's Ride" is the lead single released from American singer-songwriter Montell Jordan's third album of the same name. The song was produced by Teddy Bishop, arranged by R&B singer Case and featured verses from American rappers Master P and Silkk the Shocker.

"Let's Ride" became a huge hit in 1998, making it to number two on the Billboard Hot 100. The song also spent three non-consecutive weeks at number one on the Hot R&B Singles chart, becoming his second-most successful single after 1995's "This Is How We Do It". "Let's Ride" was certified platinum by the RIAA on April 22, 1998 for individual sales of over 1,000,000 copies. The song was sent to radio stations on February 17, 1998.

== Single track listing ==
=== A-Side ===
1. "Let's Ride" (Radio Edit)- 3:47

=== B-Side ===
1. "Let's Ride" (LP Version)- 4:51
2. "Let's Ride" (Instrumental)- 4:51

== Charts and certifications ==
=== Weekly charts ===
Chart (1998)	Peak position
New Zealand (Recorded Music NZ)	14
Scottish Singles Sales (Official Charts)	88
UK Singles (Official Charts)	25
UK Dance (Official Charts)	11
UK Hip Hop/R&B (Official Charts)	5
US Billboard Hot 100	2
US Hot R&B/Hip-Hop Songs (Billboard)	1
US Rhythmic Airplay (Billboard)	7

=== Year-end charts ===
Chart (1998)	Position
US Billboard Hot 100	27
US Hot R&B/Hip-Hop Songs (Billboard)	6

=== Certifications ===
Region	Certification	Certified units/sales
United States (RIAA)	Platinum	1,300,000

== See also ==
- List of number-one R&B singles of 1998 (U.S.)
