= HMS Harvester =

Two ships of the Royal Navy have carried the name HMS Harvester:

- HMS Harvester (1918) was a 24-class minesweeping sloop launched 1918, sold for breaking up 1922.
- HMS Harvester (H19) was a H-class destroyer ordered by the Brazilian navy as Jurua, purchased by the British before launch, launched as HMS Handy September 1939, renamed Harvester January 1940, sunk 1943.
