= Priceless (Kelly Price album) =

Studio album by Kelly Price
- Released: April 29, 2003
- Length: 71:29
- Labels: Def Jam; Def Soul
- Producers: Bob Arrington; Warryn Campbell; Dave Cintron; Mike City; Co-P; Stevie J.; Jake and the Phatman; Kelly Price; Raphael Saadiq; Curtis Smith; James Wright

Kelly Price chronology
One Family: A Christmas Album (2001)	Priceless (2003)	This Is Who I Am (2006)

Singles from Priceless
- 1. "Take It To The Head" Released: 2002; 2. "Someday" Released: 2002; 3. "How Does It Feel (Married Your Girl)" Released: 2002; 4. "He Proposed" Released: 2003

Priceless is the fourth studio album by American singer Kelly Price. It was released by Def Jam Recordings and Def Soul on April 29, 2003, in the United States. The album peaked at number 2 on the US Billboard Top R&B/Hip-Hop Albums, and number 10 on the Billboard 200. It marked Price's final release with Def Soul. The song "Again" featured Brazilian influenced acoustic guitar from Eric Clapton.

== Critical reception ==
Professional ratings
Review scores
Source	Rating
AllMusic	4/5 stars
Entertainment Weekly	A−
Vibe	4/5 marks

Vibe editor Jason King found that with Priceless, Price "continues to grow as a singer/songwriter, giving us glimpses of her multifaceted personality." He called "You Brought the Sunshine" a "jubilant retrofitting of the Clark Sisters inspirational disco classic" as well as the album's "most luminous moment," adding: "It's not just Priceless – it's timeless." Soren Baker from Entertainment Weekly felt that "on her third album, [Price] delivers a rousing set filled with more fire than a Judge Judy tirade. Tackling relationship highs ("He Proposed") and lows ("How Does It Feel") with equal vigor, she demonstrates her immense vocal talent." Gail Mitchell from Billboard noted that "it's a happier Price on Priceless, having emerged victorious after battling personal problems reflected on the 3-year-old Mirror Mirror. At an overly ambitious 18 tracks, though, this latest effort could stand some trimming. It's when Price gives it to us straight, no chaser [...] that the album comes to glorious life."

Britt Robson from The Washington Post called Priceless Pirce's "most cohesive and mature collection yet." She wrote: "Completing the tableau, the production and arrangements on Priceless generally eschew grand gestures and cutting-edge technical wizardry in favor of old-school riffs and rhythms [...] Those who have grown accustomed to having Kelly Price help them cry in their beer and curse their fate may be disappointed by Priceless. This is more companionable music for cleaning your house, tapping out an e-mail or sipping some wine after dinner." AllMusic editor Rob Theakston found that the album "is almost as good as her 1997 debut. Priceless reads from track to track almost like an autobiography of Price's life but Priceless is not without its faults, either. There are moments of self-indulgence that hinder Priceless from being great instead of "just good" [...] That aside, Priceless is a solid album and a much-needed return of a quality R&B vocalist in a genre over-saturated with mediocrity."

== Chart performance ==
Initially intended for an August 2002 release, and then shifted to a November 2002 street date, Priceless was eventually released on April 29, 2003 in the United States. The album debuted and peaked at number ten on the US Billboard 200 with first week sales of 69,000 copies. This marked Price's third consecutive non-Christmas-themed studio album to reach the top ten. Priceless also became her third album to reach the top three on Billboard Top R&B/Hip-Hop Albums, peaking at number two.

== Track listing ==
Priceless track listing
No.	Title	Writer(s)	Producer(s)	Length
1.	"Introlude (The Pricey Bunch)"	Kelly Price; Frank DeVol; Sherwood Schwartz; Warryn Campbell	Campbell	2:04
2.	"Someday"	Price; Campbell	Campbell	3:01
3.	"You Make Me Feel"	Price; Michael Flowers	Mike City	3:42
4.	"Take It to the Head" (featuring Keith Murray)	Price; Murray; Steven Jordan; Cory Peterson	Stevie J; Co-P	3:56
5.	"Sister" (featuring Faith Evans)	Price	Price	4:09
6.	"Again"	Price	Price	3:37
7.	"Priceless (Interlude)"	Price; Campbell	Campbell	1:59
8.	"Strong Man (Jeff in C Minor)"	Price; James Wright	Wright	4:29
9.	"How Does It Feel (Married Your Girl)"	Price; Jordan; Peterson	Stevie J; Co-P	3:57
10.	"He Proposed"	Bob Arrington	Arrington; Curtis Smith; Dave Cintron	5:03
11.	"So Sweet"	Price; Raphael Saadiq; Standridge; Ozuna	Saadiq; Jake and the Phatman^{[a]}	4:47
12.	"Whatcha Gon' Do"	Price; Francisco Santa Cruz; Xavier Marquez	Flinstone	3:38
13.	"I Live Here Now"	Price; Flowers	City	3:54
14.	"Girlfriend"	Price	Price	3:48
15.	"If"	Price	Price	4:04
16.	"Back in the Day"	Price; Frankie Beverly; Campbell	Price; Campbell	4:42
17.	"I Still Do"	Price; Campbell	Campbell	3:59
18.	"You Brought the Sunshine" (featuring The Clark Sisters)	Elbernita "Twinkie" Clark	Campbell	6:31

Sample credits

- "Introlude (The Pricey Bunch)" contains an interpolation of "The Brady Bunch Theme Song" as written by Frank DeVol and Sherwood Schwartz.
- "Back in the Day" contains excerpts from "Joy and Pain" as performed by Frankie Beverly and Maze.

Notes

- ^{^[a]} signifies additional producer(s)

== Charts ==
=== Weekly charts ===
Weekly chart performance for Priceless
Chart (2003)	Peak position
US Billboard 200	10
US Top R&B/Hip-Hop Albums (Billboard)	2

=== Year-end charts ===
Year-end chart performance for Priceless
Chart (2003)	Position
US Top R&B/Hip-Hop Albums (Billboard)	69
