= One Wish (Deborah Cox album) =

Studio album by Deborah Cox
- Released: September 15, 1998
- Genres: Dance; club; R&B
- Length: 62:19
- Label: Arista
- Producers: Stevie J.; Kay Gee; Shep Crawford; DJ Quik; Rodney Jerkins; Daryl Simmons; Lascelles Stephens; David Foster; Hex Hector

Deborah Cox chronology
Deborah Cox (1995)	One Wish (1998)	The Morning After (2002)

Singles from One Wish
- 1. "Nobody's Supposed to Be Here" Released: September 15, 1998; 2. "It's Over Now" Released: May 4, 1999; 3. "We Can't Be Friends" Released: September 14, 1999; 4. "September" Released: 2000

One Wish is the second album by Canadian singer-songwriter Deborah Cox. It was released by Arista Records on September 15, 1998, in the United States. As with her self-titled debut album, One Wish was once again executive-produced by Clive Davis, but features more uptempo, contemporary R&B, and a slew of new producers and personnel, including Montell Jordan, Anthony "Shep" Crawford, Rodney "Darkchild" Jerkins, DJ Quik, Stevie J and David Foster. It also contains dance and club music. Diane Warren, Daryl Simmons and Lascelles Stephens also returned with contributions to the album.

The album performed better in the US than its predecessor earning a platinum certification from the Recording Industry Association of America (RIAA), while going gold in Canada. It was less successful in other territories. Cox was nominated for three Juno Awards for the album, winning two, including Best R&B Soul Recording for "Things Just Ain't the Same" in 1998 and Best R&B Soul Recording for One Wish in 1999. "Nobody's Supposed to Be Here" also won a Soul Train Music Awards for Best Female R&B/Soul Single, and a Soul Train Lady of Soul Award for Best R&B/Soul Song of the Year.

The success of the album was in part due to the crossover success of the lead single "Nobody's Supposed to Be Here" which became Cox's most successful entry on the Billboard Hot 100, peaking at number two, and remaining there for eight consecutive weeks, making it one of the longest stays at number two in chart history. The song also reached number one on the Hot R&B/Hip-Hop Songs, spending a then record-breaking 14 weeks at number one. "We Can't Be Friends" was the second-most successful single from the album, reaching the top ten, while "It's Over Now" and "I Never Knew" both reached the top on the Billboard Hot Dance Club Songs.

== Critical reception ==
Professional ratings
Review scores
Source	Rating
AllMusic	4/5 stars

AllMusic editor Jose F. Promis described the album's musical spectrum as "varied, ranging from the typical cheating man song popular at the time, to safe middle-of-the-road, adult contemporary fare, funky R&B tunes and club anthems [...] Cox's voice, a powerhouse unto itself, sounds just as effective and very sweet when she's not belting out a tune Whitney Houston-style [...] A good album, which includes a couple of quintessential 1990s dance hits, and a prime example of Arista's incomparable marketing savvy." In a review of second single "It's Over Now," Chuck Taylor from Billboard wrote that One Wish "continues to astound with a grace and beauty not found on so many of the hit R&B albums out there. Over the course of 13 songs, the ever-soulful Cox, along with a handful of savvy producers, unites multilayered grooves and lush orchestral arrangements – a divine match that harks back to the early recordings of Gladys Knight."

== Commercial performance ==
One Wish debuted at number 117 on the US Billboard 200 in the week of October 17, 1998 and eventually peaked at number 72 on November 28. The album also peaked at number 14 on Billboard's Top R&B/Hip-Hop Albums chart and became her second project to reach number one on the US Heatseekers Albums chart. On December 14, 1998, it was certified Gold by the Recording Industry Association of America (RIAA) and on July 2, 1999, the album reached Platinum status in the United States. In August 1999, One Wish also earned a Gold certification from Music Canada for selling 50,000 copies in Canada.

== Track listing ==
One Wish track listing
No.	Title	Writer(s)	Producer(s)	Length
1.	"Nobody's Supposed to Be Here"	Shep Crawford; Montell Jordan	Crawford	4:22
2.	"It's Over Now"	Keir "KayGee" Gist; Taura Stinson-Jackson; Alonzo Jackson; DeMone Griffin	Jackson; KayGee	4:20
3.	"September"	Stevie J; Deborah Cox; Gordon Chambers; Teddy "Sonny Boy" Turpin	Stevie J	4:45
4.	"We Can't Be Friends" (featuring R.L.)	Crawford; Jimmy Russell	Crawford; Professor Funk	4:41
5.	"Couldn't We"	Diane Warren	Daryl Simmons	4:32
6.	"One Wish"	Tamara Savage; Anthony Nance	Tony Maserati; DJ Quik	4:34
7.	"I Won't Give Up"	Cox; Trina Powell	Lascelles Stephens	4:32
8.	"Just When I Think I'm Over You"	Marti Sharron; Stephens; Dan Sembello	Rodney Jerkins	3:55
9.	"Love Is On the Way"	Stevie J; Cox; Stephens; Turpin; Rod Temperton	Stevie J	4:43
10.	"I Never Knew"	Rodney Jerkins; Fred Jerkins III; LaShawn Daniels; Isaac Phillips; BlackGirl	Jerkins	5:05
11.	"One Day You Will"	Warren	David Foster	4:12
12.	"Nobody's Supposed to Be Here" (Dance Mix)	Crawford; Jordan	Crawford; Hex Hector^{[a]}	4:14
13.	"Things Just Ain't the Same" (Dance Mix)	Nicole Renée; Alfred Antoine; Andre Evans; Thom Bell; Linda Creed	Crawford; Hector^{[a]}	4:11
14.	"September" (KayGee Remix) (hidden track)	Stevie J; Cox; Chambers; Turpin	Stevie J; KayGee^{[a]}	4:13
Total length:				62:19

One Wish – Japanese edition
No.	Title	Writer(s)	Producer(s)	Length
14.	"Things Just Ain't The Same"	Renée; Antoine; Evans; Bell; Creed	Evans	3:38
15.	"September" (KayGee Remix) (hidden track)	Stevie J; Cox; Chambers; Turpin	Stevie J; KayGee^{[a]}	4:13
Total length:				65:57

Notes

- "September" (KayGee remix) is a hidden track.
- The original version of "Things Just Ain't the Same" was featured on the Money Talks soundtrack. It appears on the Japanese edition of the album.
- ^{^a} signifies an additional producer

== Charts ==
=== Weekly charts ===
Weekly chart performance for One Wish
Chart (1998)	Peak position
US Billboard 200	72
US Heatseekers Albums (Billboard)	1
US Top R&B/Hip-Hop Albums (Billboard)	14

=== Year-end charts ===
Year-end chart performance for One Wish
Chart (1999)	Position
US Billboard 200	154
US Top R&B/Hip-Hop Albums (Billboard)	42

== Certifications ==
Certifications for One Wish
Region	Certification	Certified units/sales
Canada (Music Canada)	Gold	50,000^{^}
United States (RIAA)	Platinum	1,000,000^{^}
^{^} Shipments figures based on certification alone.
