= Mirror Mirror (Kelly Price album) =

Studio album by Kelly Price
- Released: June 27, 2000
- Genre: R&B
- Length: 64:46
- Label: Def Soul
- Producers: Warryn Campbell; Shep Crawford; R. Kelly; Peter Mokran; PAJAM; Kelly Price; Teddy Riley; Benny Tillman; Chucky Thompson; Carlos Thornton

Kelly Price chronology
Soul of a Woman (1998)	Mirror Mirror (2000)	One Family: A Christmas Album (2001)

Singles from Mirror Mirror
- 1. "As We Lay" Released: 2000; 2. "Love Sets You Free (Remix)" Released: 2000; 3. "You Should've Told Me" Released: 2000; 4. "Mirror, Mirror" Released: 2000

Mirror Mirror is the second studio album by American R&B singer Kelly Price. It was released by Def Soul on June 27, 2000, in the United States. Conceived after her transition from the Isley Brothers' T-Neck label and Island Records, following a lawsuit against both labels and the Isley Brothers Music Corp, Price enlisted a group of industry friends to work with her on her next album, including Gerald Levert, K-Ci, R. Kelly, Warryn Campbell, and Shep Crawford, who would produce the majority of the material.

The album earned generally positive reviews from music critics, with particular praise for Price's vocal performance, though some were critical with the album's production. Mirror Mirror became her first top ten album on the US Billboard 200, debuting and peaking at number five, and sold more than 1.07 million copies domestically. It spawned four singles, with lead single "As We Lay" and third single "You Should've Told Me" becoming top 20 hits on the US Hot R&B/Hip-Hop Songs chart.

== Background ==
In 1998, Kelly Price released her debut album Soul of a Woman through the Isley Brothers' T-Neck Records. A major success, it reached Platinum status in the United States and sold 1.3 more than million copies domestically, with "Friend of Mine," a remix of Price's debut single, becoming a number-one hit on the Hot R&B/Hip-Hop Songs chart. Toward the end of 1998, the singer's business relationship with the Isleys soured, however. In February 1999, she sued T-Neck, its distributing label Island Records, T-Neck head Ronald Isley the Isley Brothers Music Corp. amid alleged breach of contract and interferences with other recording opportunities, including inappropriate use of her name to promote concert dates with the Isleys, and interfere with her participation on the Whitney Houston song "Heartbreak Hotel" (1998), as well as other planned collaborations. As a result of the legal dispute, Price transferred to Def Soul where she began work on her second studio album.

== Critical reception ==
Professional ratings
Review scores
Source	Rating
AllMusic	4/5 stars
Robert Christgau	(2-star Honorable Mention)
Entertainment Weekly	B
Rolling Stone	3/5 stars
USA Today	3.5/4 stars

Lynn Norment from Ebony wrote that with Mirror Mirror, "Price demonstrates that she is not a one-hit wonder. With tremendous vocals and poignant lyrics that she penned, Price returns with a second set of great songs that speak to the heart from the heart." Norment ranked "the soulful "She Wants You", "3 Strikes," and the powerful" "Mirror Mirror" among the album's standouts. AllMusic editor Michael Gallucci found that "on her second album, [Price] goes through many R&B motions – over-singing, pallid bedroom songs, tuneless tales – but still manages to sound like a genuinely thrilled diva in the process. Filled with slow jams, slick hip-hop, and gospel, Mirror Mirror is a more rounded record than Price's debut [...] She puts an individualist's stamp on the album, a looking glass, if you will, into her soul." Billboard critic Michael Paoletta called Mirror Mirror a "reflection of what lies ahead for Price (and why shouldn't it be?), one thing is certain: She's here to stay."

Vibe editor Keronda "Kiki" McKnight found that "through every track on Mirror Mirror is a crowd pleaser, Kelly doesn't bring anything particularly new to the R&B; set. In fact, she brings something that's all but forgotten these days: real singing. While repetitious lyrics and mediocre production fuel most of the songs on Mirror, it's Kelly's powerhouse of a voice that will make R&B; purists flock to her latest effort in droves." Entertainment Weekly's Matt Diehl wrote tat "despite a penchant for souled-out clichés [...] scorching ballads like "Married Man" and the hip-hop "Like You Do" demonstrate a welcome un-diva-like approachability." The Source felt that much like her debut, Mirror Mirror "leaves traces of a mending heart [...] This time around, Kelly shows signs of a diva in waiting, taking more control of her feelings and her relationships. Perhaps she combats the shallowness of the music industry by reaching the depths of emotion and vocal richness that she's so comfortable delivering."

== Chart performance ==
Mirror Mirror debuted and peaked at number five on the US Billboard 200 and number three on the Top R&B/Hip-Hop Albums chart in the week of July 15, 2000. It became Price's first top ten entry on the Billboard 200, selling 157,000 copies in its first week of release. The album was certified Gold by the Recording Industry Association of America (RIAA) on January 19, 2001 and reached Platinum status on February 7, 2001. By November 2002, Mirror Mirror had sold 1.1 million copies in the United States.

== Track listing ==
Mirror Mirror track listing
No.	Title	Writer(s)	Producer(s)	Length
1.	"Mirror Mirror (Interlude)"	Kelly Price; Warryn Campbell; Gene Dozier; Kenny St. Lewis; Minnie Riperton; Richard Rudolph	Price; Campbell	2:06
2.	"Good Love"	Price; Campbell	Campbell	3:47
3.	"You Should've Told Me"	Price; James Moss; Paul Allen	PAJAM	3:14
4.	"At Least (The Little Things)"	R. Kelly	R. Kelly	4:14
5.	"National Anthem (Interlude)" (featuring R. Kelly)	Shep Crawford	Crawford	1:21
6.	"She Wants You"	Price; Crawford	Crawford	4:18
7.	"3 Strikes"	Price; Campbell	Campbell	5:01
8.	"Mirror, Mirror"	Price	Price	5:16
9.	"Can't Run Away"	Price; Campbell	Campbell	4:32
10.	"The Lullaby" (featuring Jeffrey Jr. & Jonia)	Price; Peter Mokran	Price; Mokran	4:20
11.	"Married Man"	Price; Perry Botkin; Crawford; Barry Devorzon	Crawford	4:05
12.	"Like You Do" (featuring Method Man)	Price; Dennis Lambert; Sylvester Levay; Brian Potter; Stephan Prager; Clifford Smith	Benny Tillman; Carlos Thornton	4:18
13.	"All I Want Is You" (featuring K-Ci & Gerald Levert)	Price	Campbell	4:38
14.	"As We Lay"	William Beck; Larry Troutman	Crawford	6:20
15.	"I Know Who Holds Tomorrow"	Ira Stanphill	Price; Campbell	3:08

Bonus track
No.	Title	Writer(s)	Producer(s)	Length
16.	"Love Sets You Free" (featuring Dru Hill, Montell Jordan, Case, Playa, Aaron Hall, LovHer & Kandice Love)	Price; Aaron Phillips; Denise Rich; Teddy Riley; Chucky Thompson	Thompson; Riley	4:09

Sample credits

- "Mirror Mirror (Interlude)" contains a sample from "Memory Lane" as performed by Minnie Riperton.
- "Married Man" contains an interpolation of "Nadia's Theme" as composed by Barry De Vorzon and Perry Botkin, Jr.
- "Like You Do" contains an interpolation of "Ain't No Woman (Like the One I've Got)" and a sample from "Fly Robin Fly" as performed by Four Tops and Silver Convention, respectively.

== Charts ==
=== Weekly charts ===
Weekly chart performance for Mirror Mirror
Chart (2000)	Peak position
US Billboard 200	5
US Top R&B/Hip-Hop Albums (Billboard)	3

=== Year-end charts ===
Year-end chart performance for Mirror Mirror
Chart (2000)	Position
US Billboard 200	100
US Top R&B/Hip-Hop Albums (Billboard)	23

== Certifications ==
Certifications for Mirror Mirror
Region	Certification	Certified units/sales
United States (RIAA)	Platinum	1,100,000
