= Nobody's Supposed to Be Here =

1998 single by Deborah Cox

Single by Deborah Cox

from the album One Wish
- B-side: "Sentimental"; "It's Over Now" (club mix)
- Released: September 15, 1998
- Genre: Soul; R&B
- Length: 4:22
- Label: Arista
- Songwriters: Montell Jordan; Anthony "Shep" Crawford
- Producer: Anthony "Shep" Crawford

Deborah Cox singles chronology
"Things Just Ain't the Same" (1997)	"Nobody's Supposed to Be Here" (1998)	"It's Over Now" (1999)

Music video
- "Nobody's Supposed to Be Here" on YouTube

"Nobody's Supposed to Be Here" is a song by Canadian recording artist Deborah Cox, released as the lead single from her second studio album, One Wish (1998). Written by Montell Jordan and its producer, Anthony "Shep" Crawford, the song was released on the same day as the album, on September 15, 1998, by Arista Records. It is Cox's most successful song, peaking at number two on the Billboard Hot 100 for eight weeks and spending a then-record 14 weeks at number one on the Hot R&B Singles & Tracks chart. In 2017, Billboard ranked the song at number five on its "Greatest of All Time Hot R&B/Hip-Hop Songs" chart.

== Critical reception ==
Larry Flick of Billboard wrote, "Cox previews her second album with a stirring old-school soul ballad that's perhaps the best vocal showcase she's ever had. The groove cruises at a languid, finger-poppin' jeep pace, giving her plenty of room to get down and dirty, vamping as if she's lived every syllable of the song's tale of a love fraught with drama. Justice prevailing, pop and R&B radio programmers will find this a refreshing change of pace from the saccharine ballads currently glutting the airwaves. And if they don't, they'll have Hex Hector's wholly accessible uptempo dance reconstruction to embrace. It's easily among the best efforts of the young remixer's career. In all, this is a fine single hinting that Cox is about to pay off on all of the promise and hype generated by her first album two years ago."

== Commercial performance ==
"Nobody's Supposed to Be Here" reached number two on the Billboard Hot 100 on the week of December 5, 1998, and remained there for eight consecutive weeks, making it one of the longest stays at number two in Billboard history. The song ranked at number nine on the Billboard year-end chart for 1999. The song reached number one on Billboard Hot R&B Singles chart on the week of November 7, 1998, and remained there for 14 weeks. At the end of 1999, "Nobody's Supposed to Be Here" ranked at number two on the Hot R&B/Hip Hop Singles & Tracks year-end chart. The song was remixed by dance music producer Hex Hector, and peaked at number one on the Billboard Dance Club Songs chart in the week of October 24, 1998. As of 1999, the song has sold 1,900,000 copies in the United States and has been certified Platinum by the Recording Industry Association of America (RIAA).

== Awards ==
- 1998: Soul Train Award for Best R&B/Soul Single – Female
- 1999: Soul Train Lady of Soul Award for Best R&B/Soul Song of the Year

== Track listings ==
US CD and cassette single; European CD single

1. "Nobody's Supposed to Be Here" – 4:10
2. "Nobody's Supposed to Be Here" (dance mix) – 4:13

US maxi-CD single

1. "Nobody's Supposed to Be Here" (Hex Hector's club mix) – 10:07
2. "Nobody's Supposed to Be Here" (dance radio mix) – 4:13
3. "Nobody's Supposed to Be Here" (Hex's dub) – 6:17
4. "Nobody's Supposed to Be Here" (original version) – 4:21
5. "Nobody's Supposed to Be Here" (original version instrumental) – 4:21

US 12-inch single

A1. "Nobody's Supposed to Be Here" (Hex Hector's club mix) – 10:07
A2. "Nobody's Supposed to Be Here" (original version) – 4:21
B1. "Nobody's Supposed to Be Here" (Hex's dub) – 6:17
B2. "Nobody's Supposed to Be Here" (Hex's beats) – 4:02
B3. "Nobody's Supposed to Be Here" (dance radio mix) – 4:13

UK CD1

1. "Nobody's Supposed to Be Here" (Club 69 radio mix) – 3:49
2. "Nobody's Supposed to Be Here" (album version) – 4:21
3. "Sentimental" (album version) – 4:26

UK CD2

1. "Nobody's Supposed to Be Here" (Club 69 radio mix) – 3:49
2. "It's Over Now" (Hex Retro-Future club mix) – 7:27
3. "Nobody's Supposed to Be Here" (Hex Hector dance radio mix) – 4:13

Australian CD single

1. "Nobody's Supposed to Be Here" (original version) – 4:21
2. "Nobody's Supposed to Be Here" (Hex Hector's club mix) – 10:07
3. "Nobody's Supposed to Be Here" (dance radio mix) – 4:13
4. "Nobody's Supposed to Be Here" (Hex's dub) – 6:17
5. "Nobody's Supposed to Be Here" (original version instrumental) – 4:21

== Charts ==
=== Weekly charts ===
Chart (1998–1999)	Peak position
Australia (ARIA)	62
Canada Top Singles (RPM)	21
Canada Adult Contemporary (RPM)	7
Canada Dance/Urban (RPM)	3
Germany (GfK)	51
Iceland (Íslenski Listinn Topp 40)	34
Netherlands (Dutch Top 40 Tipparade)	21
Netherlands (Single Top 100)	84
UK Singles (Official Charts)	55
UK Hip Hop/R&B (Official Charts)	5
US Billboard Hot 100	2
US Dance Club Songs (Billboard)	1
US Dance Singles Sales (Billboard)	2
US Hot R&B/Hip-Hop Songs (Billboard)	1
US Pop Airplay (Billboard)	32
US Rhythmic Airplay (Billboard)	12

=== Year-end charts ===
Chart (1998)	Position
Canada Adult Contemporary (RPM)	56
Canada Dance (RPM)	23
US Billboard Hot 100	99
US Dance Club Play (Billboard)	18
US Hot R&B Singles (Billboard)	38
US Maxi-Singles Sales (Billboard)	18

Chart (1999)	Position
Canada Dance/Urban (RPM)	41
US Billboard Hot 100	9
US Hot R&B/Hip-Hop Singles & Tracks (Billboard)	2
US Maxi-Singles Sales (Billboard)	20
US Rhythmic Top 40 (Billboard)	42

=== Decade-end charts ===
Chart (1990–1999)	Position
US Billboard Hot 100	60

== Certifications and sales ==
Region	Certification	Certified units/sales
United States (RIAA)	Platinum	1,900,000

== Release history ==
Region	Date	Format(s)	Label(s)	Ref.
United States	August 7, 1998	Radio	Arista	
United States	September 15, 1998	12-inch vinyl; CD; cassette	Arista	
Finland	February 15, 1999	CD	Arista; BMG	
United Kingdom	September 27, 1999	CD; cassette	Arista; BMG	

== See also ==
- R&B number-one hits of 1998 (USA)
- R&B number-one hits of 1999 (USA)
- Number-one dance hits of 1998 (USA)
