= This Is Who I Am (Heather Headley album) =

Studio album by Heather Headley
- Released: October 8, 2002
- Recorded: July 1998–June 2001
- Genre: R&B
- Length: 48:29
- Label: RCA
- Producer: Stephen Ferrera (also exec.); Dallas Austin; Big Bob; Capt'n Curt; Shep Crawford; D'Influence; Gary Haase; Jimmy Jam and Terry Lewis; Rob Mounsey; Nile; Vada Nobles; The Phantom; Sy Smith; Reed Vertelney; Dave Way

Heather Headley chronology
This Is Who I Am (2002)	In My Mind (2006)

This Is Who I Am is the debut studio album by Trinidadian-American singer Heather Headley. It was released on October 8, 2002 by RCA Records. The album was certified gold by the Recording Industry Association of America (RIAA) on June 3, 2003, and has sold 677,000 copies in the United States.

== Critical reception ==
Professional ratings
Review scores
Source	Rating
AllMusic	4/5 stars
Blender	3/5 stars

John Bush from AllMusic found that "though she didn't come out of the R&B tradition, Heather Headley has plenty of soul on her debut, This Is Who I Am. Headley, a singer whose vocal strength isn't mere compensation for a lack of interpretive skills or lame songwriting, possesses a range that's surprising and welcome; she slips on dramatic personas continually here, quite ironic considering the title.."

== Track listing ==
No.	Title	Writer(s)	Producer(s)	Length
1.	"He Is"	Joshua Nile; Vernon Jeffrey Smith	Nile; The Phantom; Dave Way	3:46
2.	"Nature of a Man"	Sylvia Bennett-Smith; Reed Vertelney; Shanice Wilson	Vertelney; Smith; Way	3:24
3.	"Fallin' for You"	Headley; Edward Baden-Powell; Kwame Kwaten; Steve Marston	D-Influence	3:02
4.	"I Wish I Wasn't"	James Wright; James Harris III; Terry Lewis	Jimmy Jam and Terry Lewis	6:18
5.	"Fulltime"	Raheem DeVaughn; Bobby Terry; Clifton Jones; Curtis Williams; Jerry Vines	Big Bob; Capt'n Curt	3:37
6.	"Like Ya Use to"	Dallas Austin; Jasper Cameron	Austin	4:05
7.	"Always Been Your Girl"	Shep Crawford; Deborah Cox; Lascelles Stephens	Crawford	4:35
8.	"Sunday"	Headley; Baden-Powell; Kwaten; Marston	D-Influence	3:27
9.	"Four Words from a Heartbreak"	Nile	Nile; The Phantom	3:37
10.	"Sista Girl"	Headley; Gary Haase	Haase	4:29
11.	"Why Should I Cry"	Rasheem Pugh; Vada Nobles	Nobles	3:47
12.	"If It Wasn't for Your Love"	Chris Ballard; Gordon Chambers; Andrew Murray	Rob Mounsey; Stephen Ferrera	3:54

This Is Who I Am — Japanese edition (bonus tracks)
No.	Title	Writer(s)	Producer(s)	Length
13.	"Sunday (Mix)"	Headley; Baden-Powell; Kwaten; Marston	D-Influence	3:18
14.	"Just One Dream"	Walter Afanasieff; John Bettis	Afanasieff	4:00

== Personnel ==
Credits are taken from the album's liner notes.

Instruments and performances

- Guitars: Dallas Austin, Terrence Elliot, Tomi Martin, Jeff Mironov
- Bass: Steve Mostyn
- Percussion: Steve Marston
- Keyboards: Kwame Kwaten, Rob Mounsey, Michael Norfleet, Jeremy Ruzumna, James Wright
- Rap: Chukki Starr

Technical and production

- Engineered by: Wayne Allison, Anne Catalino, Mike Ging, Steve Hodge, Adam Kagan, Carlton Lynn, Chauncey Mahan, James Muller, Anthony Ruotolo, Rick Sheppard, Christine Sirois, Reed Vertelney, Bradley Yost, Andy Zulla
- Mixed by: Dave Way, Steve Hodge, Andy Zulla, Chauncey Mahan

== Charts ==
=== Weekly charts ===
Chart (2002)	Peak position
US Billboard 200	38
US Top R&B/Hip-Hop Albums (Billboard)	14

=== Year-end charts ===
Chart (2003)	Position
US Billboard 200	163
US Top R&B/Hip-Hop Albums (Billboard)	46

== Certifications ==
Region	Certification	Certified units/sales
United States (RIAA)	Gold	500,000^{^}
^{^} Shipments figures based on certification alone.

== Release history ==
List of release dates, showing region, editions and label
Region	Date	Edition(s)	Label
United States	October 8, 2002	CD; digital download	RCA
United Kingdom	October 14, 2002	CD; digital download	RCA
Japan	February 5, 2003	CD; digital download	Sony
