= Let's Ride (album) =

Studio album by Montell Jordan
- Released: March 31, 1998
- Recorded: 1997–1998
- Genre: R&B
- Length: 69:07
- Labels: Def Soul; Def Jam
- Producers: Ted Bishop; Jazz "The Man"; Beats by the Pound

Montell Jordan chronology
More… (1996)	Let's Ride (1998)	Get It On…Tonite (1999)

Singles from Let's Ride
- 1. "Let's Ride" Released: February 10, 1998; 2. "I Can Do That" Released: June 30, 1998

Professional ratings
Review scores
Source	Rating
Allmusic	link

Let's Ride is the third studio album by American singer Montell Jordan. It was released by Def Soul and Def Jam Recordings on March 31, 1998, in the United States. The album peaked at number 20 on the US Billboard 200 and number eight on the Top R&B/Hip-Hop Albums chart, becoming Jordan's highest-charting album. It was certified gold by the Recording Industry Association of America (RIAA) on May 4, 1998. The album spawned two hit singles, the title track, which went to number 2 on the US Billboard Hot 100, and "I Can Do That", which made it to number 14 on the Hot 100.

== Track listing ==
No.	Title	Writer(s)	Producer(s)	Length
1.	"When You Get Home"	Montell Jordan; Anthony Crawford; Leon Ware; Arthur Ross	Schappell Crawford	3:51
2.	"Don't Call Me"	Jordan; Jeffrey Walker	J-Dub; Montell Jordan	4:49
3.	"Let's Ride" (featuring Master P & Silkk the Shocker)	Jordan; Teddy Bishop; Master P; Silkk the Shocker	Teddy Bishop	4:52
4.	"I Can Do That"	Jordan; Bishop	Bishop	4:44
5.	"Midnight Rain (Interlude)"	Jordan; Crawford	Jordan	1:34
6.	"One Last Chance"	Jordan; Walker; Mariah Carey; Walter Afanasieff	J-Dub	6:05
7.	"Anything & Everything" (featuring Redman)	Jordan; Crawford; Danny Nixon; Reggie Noble	Jazz the Man	4:22
8.	"Body Ah" (featuring Lil' Bo Peep)	Jordan; Jimmy Russell; Nixon; Janay Armstrong; Vincent Herbert; Maurice White	Professor Funk; Jazz the Man	4:24
9.	"Irresistible"	Jordan	Jordan	4:09
10.	"Let's Ride (Beats By the Pound/Master P Remix)" (featuring Master P & Silkk The Shocker)	Jordan; Bishop; Master P; Silkk the Shocker	Bishop	5:12
11.	"Can I?"	Jordan	Jordan	5:24
12.	"Missing You"	Jordan; Nixon	Jazz the Man	4:08
13.	"The Longest Night"	Jordan; Russell; Crawford	Jordan; Professor Funk; Crawford	5:21
14.	"I Say Yes (Interlude)" (featuring Pastor Clarence E. McClendon)	Crawford; Clarence E. McClendon	Crawford	1:36
15.	"4 You" (featuring Schappell Crawford and Fulfillment Choir)	Jordan; Crawford; Bert Reid; Ronald Miller	Jordan; Crawford	4:35
16.	"I Say Yes"	Jordan; Crawford	Crawford; David Kershenbaum (co.)	5:32

Sample credits

- "When You Get Home" contains an interpolation of "I Want You", written by Leon Ware and Arthur Ross.
- "One Last Chance" contains an interpolation of "Butterfly", written by Mariah Carey and Walter Afanasieff.
- "Body Ah" contains an interpolation of "Brazilian Rhyme", written by Maurice White.
- "4 You" contains an interpolation of "I'll Do Anything for You", written by Bert Reid and Ronald Miller.

== Charts ==
=== Weekly charts ===
Chart (1998)	Peak position
Canada Top Albums/CDs (RPM)	95
Dutch Albums (Album Top 100)	82
German Albums (Offizielle Top 100)	75
UK Albums (Official Charts)	186
UK R&B Albums (Official Charts)	21
US Billboard 200	20
US Top R&B/Hip-Hop Albums (Billboard)	8

=== Year-end charts ===
Chart (1998)	Position
US Billboard 200	170
US Top R&B/Hip-Hop Albums (Billboard)	54

== Certifications ==
Region	Certification	Certified units/sales
United States (RIAA)	Gold	500,000^{^}
^{^} Shipments figures based on certification alone.
