= Sing Pray Love, Vol. 1: Sing =

Sing, Pray, Love, Vol. 1: Sing

Studio album by Kelly Price
- Released: June 3, 2014
- Genre: R&B
- Length: 45:05
- Label: eOne
- Producers: Anthony "Shep" Crawford; Price; Phillip "P3" Scott III

Kelly Price chronology
Kelly (2011)	Sing, Pray, Love, Vol. 1: Sing (2014)	Grace (2021)

Singles from Sing, Pray, Love, Vol. 1: Sing
- 1. "It's My Time" Released: February 25, 2014

Sing, Pray, Love, Vol. 1: Sing is the seventh studio album by American R&B singer-songwriter Kelly Price. It was released on June 3, 2014 through eOne. Steve Leggett from AllMusic reviewed the album, noting Price co-produced the album along with Anthony "Shep" Crawford and Phillip "P3" Scott III and that she "co-wrote six of the 11 tracks [...] picking things right up from her last [...] effort, Kelly.... The album was preceded by the release of one single "It's My Time."

== Promotion ==
"It's My Time" was released as the lead and only single taken from the album. The song was released to iTunes on February 25, 2014. On May 30, 2014 "It's My Time" debuted at number 5 on the Billboard Adult R&B Songs chart, the following week the song peaked at number 4 on June 7, 2014 and remained on the charts for 13 weeks. On July 5, 2014 the song debuted at number 25 on the Hot R&B Songs chart. On June 28, 2014 the song debuted at number 23 on the R&B/Hip-Hop Airplay chart, the following week the song peaked at number 22 and remained on the charts for 14 weeks. On June 17, 2014, a new version of the song was released to iTunes, titled "It's My Time (Mike Cruz EDM Mix)".

== Critical reception ==
Editor Melody Charles from SoulTracks wrote: "Blessed with some of the most powerful of pipes in her generation, Kelly Price is a singer and songwriter who has combined equal measure of gospel fervor and relatable authenticity since her 1998 debut. No matter what medium she's delivering in live or Memorex the clarity and conviction poured into Kelly's performances are enough to make the listener want to run down an aisle ("He Proposed"), shout His praises ("This Is Who I Am") or throw a temper tantrum ("Tired") all at the same time, which is why Sing Pray Love, Vol. 1: Sing is such an appropriate title for her seventh studio release."

== Commercial performance ==
The album debuted at number 64 on the US Billboard 200 chart, number 6 on the Billboard R&B Albums, number 12 on the US Independent Albums chart and number 10 on the US Top R&B/Hip-Hop Albums chart on June 21, 2014.

== Track listing ==
Sing Pray Love, Vol. 1: Sing track listing
No.	Title	Writer(s)	Length
1.	"Sing Pray Love Interlude"	Kelly Price; Anthony "Shep" Crawford	2:06
2.	"It's My Time"	Price; Crawford; Philip Scott III	5:06
3.	"Back 2 Love" (featuring Ruben Studdard)	Price; Crawford; Price	3:11
4.	"The 14th"	Price; Crawford; D. Foreman; Jimmy "Professa" Russell	4:36
5.	"Think Again (Shep's Sermon)"	Price; Crawford	4:11
6.	"Last Night"	Price; Crawford	4:16
7.	"Through the Fire"	David Foster; Tom Keane; Cynthia Weil	5:22
8.	"Neva Been Scared"	Price; Dwayne "Dem Jointz" Abernathy Jr.	3:18
9.	"Conversations with her" (featuring Algebra Blessett)	Price; Crawford; Scott	3:19
10.	"Our Love"	Price; Crawford; Scott	4:09
11.	"Metamorphosis"	Price; Crawford	5:38

== Credits and personnel ==
Performers and musicians

- Kelly Price – Vocals, Background
- Ruben Studdard – Vocals (track 3)
- Algebra Blessett – Vocals (track 9)

Technical personnel

- Kelly Price – Producer
- Phillip "P3" Scott III – Producer, Instruments
- Anthony "Shep" Crawford – Producer, Instruments
- Isabel Evans – A&R
- Danielle Brimm – A&R
- Andrew Kelley – Art Direction
- Julia Sutowski – Coordinator, Production
- Paul Grosso – Creative Director
- Deborah Rigaud – eOne
- Esq – eOne
- Jeffery Rolle – Management
- Brendan Laezza – Management, Digital Marketing
- Chris Herche – Management, Digital Marketing
- Dontay Thompson – Management, Radio Promo
- Maurice White – Management, Radio Promo
- Marleny Dominguez – Management, VP Of Urban
- James Cruz – Mastering
- Peter Mokran – Mixing
- Stevier – Photography
- Shawnte Crespo – Production Senior Manager
- Victor Morante – Production Direction Manager
- John McDonald – Production Senior Manager

== Charts ==
Weekly chart performance for Sing Pray Love, Vol. 1: Sing
Chart (2014)	Peak position
US Billboard 200	64
US Independent Albums (Billboard)	12
US Top R&B/Hip-Hop Albums (Billboard)	10
US Top R&B Albums (Billboard)	6

== Release history ==
Sing Pray Love, Vol. 1: Sing release history
Region	Date	Format	Label	Ref(s)
United States	June 3, 2014	CD	eOne	
Various	June 3, 2014	Digital download	eOne	
