= The Harvesters (band) =

Swedish alternative country music band

The Harvesters, earlier The International Harvesters is a Swedish alternative country music band signed to the Atenzia Records (AB) label.

Their debut album All Kinds of Beautiful was released in January 2012, entering at No. 7 on the Swedish Albums Chart in its first week of release (week 3, dated 20 January 2012).

== Members ==
- Anders
- Jerker
- Henkan
- Stefan
- Fredrik

== Awards ==
- In 2009, they won Best Alternative Country Band at the Country-SM Awards in Sweden.

== Discography ==
=== Albums ===
List of albums with Swedish chart positions
Year	Album details	SWE	Certification (Sweden)	Notes
2012	All Kinds of Beautiful: First studio album; Released: 18 January 2012; Label: Atenzia Records; Format: CD	7		Track listing: 1. "Who Needs Money"; 2. "Hands Off She's All Mine"; 3. "Whenever You Come Around"; 4. "All Kinds of Beautiful"; 5. "You'll Find Your Way"; 6. "Everybody Gotta Love Somebody"; 7. "Hammer & Nails"; 8. "We're Gone"; 9. "Doin' What I Shouldn't"; 10. "Teardrops"; 11. "I Want You to Want Me"
