= Shae Jones =

American R&B singer (born 1968)

- Born: Shae Jones; July 27, 1968 (age 58); Kansas City, Missouri, U.S.
- Genres: R&B, new jack swing, hip hop
- Occupation: singer-songwriter
- Years active: 1998–2000
- Label: Universal

Shae Jones (born July 27, 1968) is an American R&B singer. She was discovered in the late 1990s by R&B star Montell Jordan, who liked the fact that her voice did not sound like other voices.

After signing with Universal Records, Jones' recorded her debut album Talk Show in 1998; the album was released on January 26, 1999. The album's lead single "Talk Show Shhh!" peaked on the Billboard Hot 100 at 88.

In addition to her solo career, Jones also appeared on Sisqó's Unleash the Dragon, Gina Thompson's If You Only Knew, Tamia's A Nu Day, Whitney Houston's The Greatest Hits and the Phil Collins tribute Urban Renewal.

== Discography ==
| Year | Title | Chart positions | |
| Year | Title | U.S. R&B | U.S. Heatseekers |
|---|---|---|---|
| 1999 | Talk Show: Released: January 26, 1999; Label: Universal | 43 | 16 |
