= This Is Who I Am (Kelly Price album) =

Studio album by Kelly Price
- Released: October 24, 2006
- Genre: Gospel
- Length: 54:57
- Label: EclecticSounds; GospoCentric
- Producer: Price

Kelly Price chronology
Priceless (2003)	This Is Who I Am (2006)	Kelly (2011)

This Is Who I Am is the fifth studio album by American singer Kelly Price. It was released on October 24, 2006, on the EclecticSounds Entertainment and GospoCentric Records.

== Track listing ==
This Is Who I Am track listing
No.	Title	Writer(s)	Producer(s)	Length
1.	"This Is Who I Am"	Kelly Price	Price; H.R. Crum^{[A]}	4:36
2.	"Heaven's Best"	Price; Al Green; Mabon Hodges	Price; Crump^{[A]}	4:47
3.	"The Warning"	Price	Price	5:36
4.	"God Is Faithful" (featuring Donnie McClurkin)	Price	Price	4:41
5.	"God Is Not Dead" (featuring Joe Ligon)	Margaret Douroux	Price	4:17
6.	"Just As I Am"	Price	Price	3:50
7.	"What A Friend" (featuring Richard Smallwood)	Richard Smallwood	Price	5:04
8.	"Get Up And Praise"	Price	Price	3:52
9.	"I Can't Turn Back"	Price	Price	5:46
10.	"Healing"	Price	Price; Crump^{[A]}	4:12
11.	"Nobody But Jesus" (featuring Vanessa Bell Armstrong)	Steve Roberts	Price	8:16

Notes

- ^{^[A]} signifies additional producer(s)

== Charts ==
Weekly chart performance for This Is Who I Am
Chart (2006)	Peak position
US Billboard 200	54
US Top R&B/Hip-Hop Albums (Billboard)	9
