= Kelly Price =

American singer (born 1973)

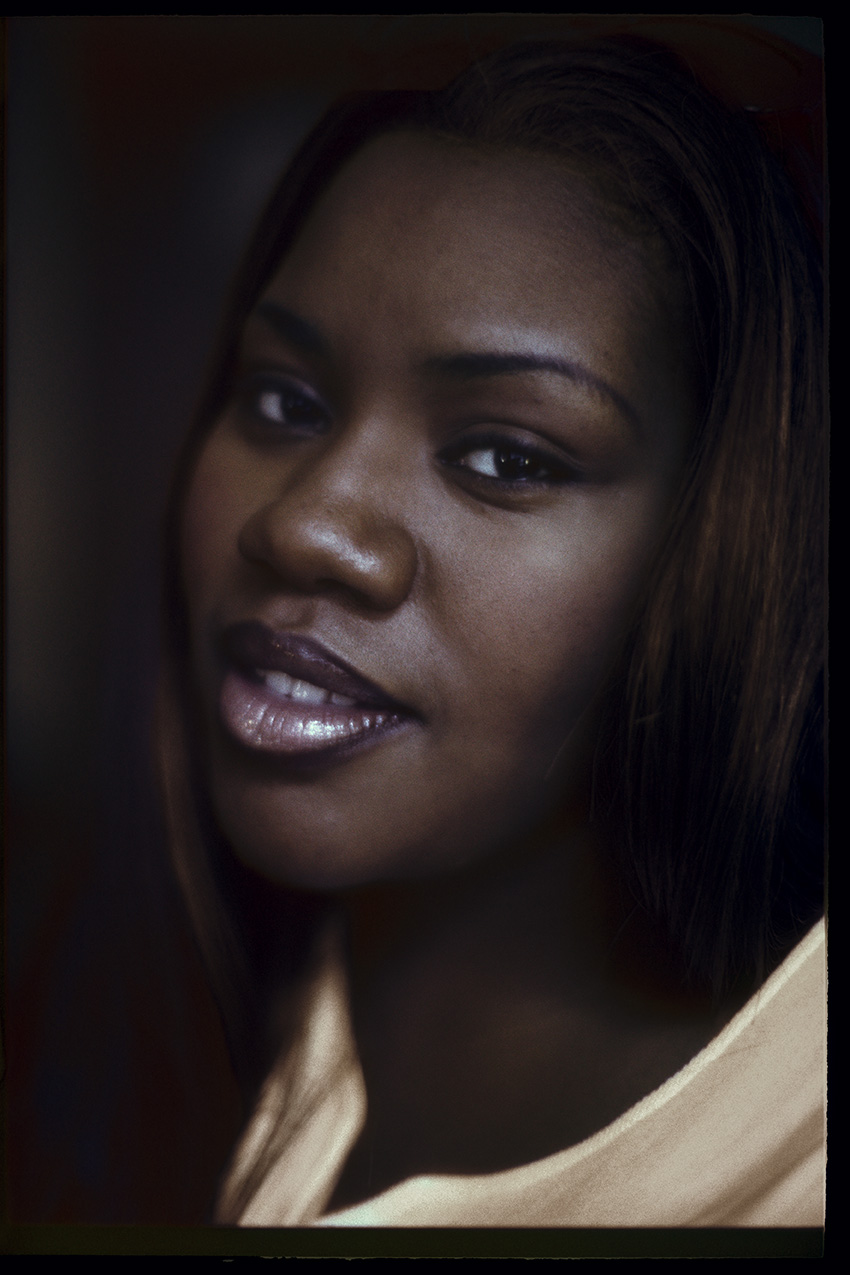
- Price in July 2000

Background information
- Born: April 4, 1973 (age 53); Queens, New York City, U.S.
- Genres: R&B; soul; gospel
- Occupations: Singer; songwriter
- Years active: 1992–present
- Labels: E1; Malaco; My Block; EclectiSounds; Gospo Centric; Def Soul; Sang Girl; T-Neck; Island
- Formerly of: The Hitmen
- Website: kellyprice.com

Kelly Cherelle Price (born April 4, 1973) is an American R&B and gospel singer and songwriter. Beginning her career in 1992, Price originally performed backing vocals for Mariah Carey on multiple songs, including Carey's Billboard Hot 100-number one singles "All I Want for Christmas Is You" and "Fantasy." Price rose to wider prominence in 1997 following her uncredited performances on the number-one single "Mo Money Mo Problems" by the Notorious B.I.G. and the top-five single "Feel So Good" by Mase, prompting her to record as a lead artist. Her debut studio album, Soul of a Woman (1998), received platinum certification by the Recording Industry Association of America (RIAA); its lead single, "Friend of Mine" (featuring R. Kelly and Ronald Isley) peaked within the top 20 of the Billboard Hot 100.

Price guest featured alongside Faith Evans on Whitney Houston's 1998 single "Heartbreak Hotel," which peaked at number two on the chart and earned a Grammy Award nomination for Best R&B Performance by a Duo or a Group with Vocals. Her second and fourth albums, Mirror Mirror (2000) and Priceless (2003), both peaked within the top ten of the Billboard 200. She provided uncredited guest performances on Kanye West's 2016 songs "Ultralight Beam" and "Low Lights" (recording a sample of "So Alive" by Kings of Tomorrow), both from his album The Life of Pablo.

Price has won a Soul Train Music Award, and received nine Grammy Award nominations.

== Life and music career ==
Price was born in New York City in Far Rockaway, Queens, and she sang in church as a youngster. Her first professional engagement was with singer George Michael at Madison Square Garden in New York City in January 1992. During rehearsals for the 1992 Grammy Awards the next month, Price was overheard singing in the rehearsal hall by Mariah Carey. Price was later introduced to Carey's then-husband, Sony Columbia's then CEO Tommy Mottola, and was offered a gig as a background singer for Carey, which she did until 1997.

Her second album, Mirror Mirror, was released in 2000 on the Def Soul imprint of Def Jam Records. Island Records and Def Jam Records had merged in 1999, with Price and some other labelmates being reassigned to the Island Def Jam subsidiary Def Soul. Mirror Mirror featured the singles "You Should've Told Me" and the Grammy Award nominated "As We Lay".

In October 2005, Price recorded her first live gospel album. The This Is Who I Am album has been released on October 24, 2006, on her own label, EcclecticSounds Records. It debuted at No. 1 on the Billboard Gospel Charts and peaked at No. 9 on the R&B album chart. Price was inducted as an honorary member of Sigma Gamma Rho sorority in July 2006. In early 2007, Price kicked off a tour with the 'Sisters in the Spirit 2007'.

In 2006, she recorded the song "Why?" for the soundtrack Why Did I Get Married?, the film version of Why Did I Get Married? Priceless Secrets from The Soul of A Woman, in which Price created the role of Sheila alongside Tyler Perry who used the song titles and lyrical content of Price's hit recordings to develop the story. In early 2009, she was featured on Coko's gospel album entitled The Winner in Me on the track "Oh Mary". In June 2010, Price promoted her single "Tired" on The Jazz Joy and Roy syndicated radio show as "some of the best work of my career to date." The song was also featured in Tyler Perry's 2011 film Madea's Big Happy Family. On February 9, 2012, in a pre-Grammy party to celebrate Price's nominations, the singer sang "Jesus Loves Me" with Whitney Houston in what turned out to be Houston's last public performance two days before her death. In September 2009, it was announced she would be joining Deborah Cox and Tamia to form the group The Queen Project. The women seek to empower women of all ages, races, and backgrounds by doing a number of community service projects.

In 2016, Kelly was included in several songs on rapper Kanye West's album, The Life of Pablo. Kelly was a co-writer with American R&B singer K. Michelle, on her single Not a Little Bit which was released on January 22, 2016. It is the lead single from the singer's third studio album, More Issues Than Vogue.

In September 2021, Price was declared missing as reported by TMZ. Her attorney later stated she was privately recuperating from a severe COVID-19 infection.

During the R. Kelly sexual abuse cases Price opened up about witnessing R. Kelly's behavior, during concerts and events and confirmed the allegations against him.

== Personal life ==
Price grew up in the Edgemere Projects located in New York City in Far Rockaway, Queens. Her father died when she was nine years old. She resides in Atlanta, Georgia. Price's grandfather was Jerome Norman, Bishop and Pastor of the Full Gospel Mission Church of God in Christ in Queens and Jurisdictional Prelate of the Barbados First Ecclesiastical Jurisdiction, since 1985. He was installed by the late Presiding Bishop J.O. Patterson. Her mother, Claudia (1951–2020), was the former musical director of the church. Price's sister, Shanrae Price, is also a singer and served as a background vocalist for Mariah Carey.

In 2020, Price lost her grandfather to COVID-19.

== Breast cancer activism ==
In December 2000, Price donated $250,000 to fight breast cancer. She presented a check to Tony Martell of the T.J. Martell Foundation and Denise Rich of G&P Foundation For Cancer Research to help with the ongoing fight against breast cancer. Price donated the proceeds from her single "Love Sets You Free" which she recorded in January 2000. In April 1999, Price volunteered to showcase her fashion designs during a special charity gala and fashion show to help the National Breast Cancer Awareness Initiative raise money for breast cancer education for minority women. The previous year, in 1998, Price learned that both her mother and her mother-in-law had been diagnosed with breast cancer, which would later claim her mother-in-law's life.

Price's mother was a survivor of inflammatory breast cancer and an activist in educating the public about the disease. She was the chairwoman of the seventh annual Sister to Sister Fitness Festival held in Dallas, Texas which was sponsored by the Celebrating Life Foundation. Claudia experienced pain in her breast in 1997, but said fear and a lack of insurance kept her from seeking immediate medical attention. Instead, she waited two years before seeing a doctor. While at work one day in 1999, her doctor called and said she had inflammatory breast cancer. Doctors gave her two months to live. She underwent chemotherapy, and the disease was in remission as of October 2006.

== Discography ==
Studio albums

- Soul of a Woman (1998)
- Mirror Mirror (2000)
- One Family: A Christmas Album (2001)
- Priceless (2003)
- This Is Who I Am (2006)
- Kelly (2011)
- Sing Pray Love, Vol. 1: Sing (2014)
- Grace (2021)

== Awards and nominations ==
AMFT Awards nominations for Kelly Price
Year	Nominee / work	Award	Result	Ref.
2016	"Ultralight Beam" (with Kanye West, Chance the Rapper, Kirk Franklin and The-Dream)	Best Rap Song	Won	
2016	"Ultralight Beam" (with Kanye West, Chance the Rapper, Kirk Franklin and The-Dream)	Best Rap Duo/Group Performance	Won	

Billboard Music Awards nominations for Kelly Price
Year	Nominee / work	Award	Result	Ref.
1998	Kelly Price	Top Hot R&B Singles Artists – Female	Nominated	
1999	"Heartbreak Hotel" (with Whitney Houston and Faith Evans)	Top Hot 100 Song	Nominated	
1999	"Heartbreak Hotel" (with Whitney Houston and Faith Evans)	Top Hot R&B/Hip-Hop Single	Nominated	
1999	"Heartbreak Hotel" (with Whitney Houston and Faith Evans)	Top Hot R&B/Hip-Hop Single Sales	Nominated	

Grammy Award nominations for Kelly Price
Year	Nominee / work	Award	Result
2000	"Heartbreak Hotel" (with Whitney Houston and Faith Evans)	Best R&B Performance by a Duo or Group with Vocals	Nominated
2001	"As We Lay"	Best Female R&B Vocal Performance	Nominated
2004	"He Proposed"	Best Traditional R&B Performance	Nominated
2011	"Tired"	Best Female R&B Vocal Performance	Nominated
2012	"Not My Daddy" (feat. Stokley Williams)	Best R&B Performance	Nominated
2012	"Not My Daddy" (feat. Stokley Williams)	Best R&B Song	Nominated
2012	Kelly	Best R&B Album	Nominated
2017	"Ultralight Beam" (with Kanye West, Chance the Rapper, Kirk Franklin and The-Dream)	Best Rap/Sung Performance	Nominated
2017	"Ultralight Beam" (with Kanye West, Chance the Rapper, Kirk Franklin and The-Dream)	Best Rap Song	Nominated

== See also ==
- List of Billboard number-one dance club songs
- List of artists who reached number one on the U.S. Dance Club Songs chart
