= Nicole Wray discography =

- Studio albums: 4
- Extended plays: 1
- Compilation albums: 2
- Singles: 34
- Music videos: 13

American singer Nicole Wray has released four studio albums, one collaborative album, two compilation albums, one EP, and 34 singles (include 11 singles as a featured performer).

She released her first album, Make It Hot, in 1998. It peaked at number 42 on the US Billboard 200 and produced the singles "Make It Hot", "I Can't See", and "Eyes Better Not Wander". After a hiatus, Wray released two compilation albums Boss Chick (2010) and Dream Factory Sessions (2011), which featured unreleased songs. In 2016, she adopted the stage name Lady Wray and released her second album Queen Alone on Big Crown Records.

== Albums ==
=== Studio albums ===
List of studio albums, with selected chart positions
Title	Album details	Peak chart positions						
Title	Album details	US	US R&B	UK	UK Americana	UK Downloads	UK Indie	UK R&B
Make It Hot	Released: August 25, 1998; Label: The Goldmind, Elektra; Formats: CD, cassette, digital download	42	19	94	—	—	—	11
Queen Alone	Released: September 23, 2016; Label: Big Crown Records; Formats: CD, LP, vinyl, digital download, streaming	—	—	—	—	—	—	—
Piece of Me	Released: January 28, 2022; Label: Big Crown Records; Formats: CD, LP, vinyl, digital download, streaming	—	—	—	17	—	43	7
Cover Girl	Released: September 26, 2025; Label: Big Crown Records; Formats: CD, cassette, LP, vinyl, digital download, streaming	—	—	—	—	81	—	—
"—" denotes releases that did not chart or were not released in that territory.

=== Collaborative albums ===
List of collaborative albums
Title	Album details
Lady	With Terri Walker; credited to Lady; Released: March 11, 2013; Label: Truth & Soul Records; Formats: CD, vinyl, digital download, streaming

=== Compilation albums ===
List of compilation albums
Title	Album details
Boss Chick	Released: June 15, 2010; Label: Danizha Inc.; Formats: Digital download
Dream Factory Sessions	With 7 Aurelius; Released: November 14, 2011 (Note: Dream Factory Sessions was released on November 14, 2011, to digital outlets. The album has since been revised to exclusive digital distribution on JunoDownload.); Label: 700 Hit Season; Formats: Digital download

== EPs ==
List of extended plays with selected details
Title	EP details
Electric Blue Effect	Released: January 3, 2020; Label: Self-released; Formats: Digital download, streaming

== Singles ==
=== As lead artist ===
List of singles as lead artist, with selected chart positions and certifications, showing year released and album name
Title	Year	Peak chart positions						Certifications	Album
Title	Year	US	US R&B	NL	NZ	UK	UK Physical	Certifications	Album
"Make It Hot" (featuring Missy Elliott and Mocha)	1998	5	2	57	26	22	22	RIAA: Gold	Make It Hot
"I Can't See"	1998	—	— (Note: "I Can't See" did not enter the Hot R&B/Hip-Hop Songs, but peaked at number 60 on the Hot R&B/Hip-Hop Airplay chart.)	—	—	55	55		Make It Hot
"Eyes Better Not Wander"	1999	—	71	—	—	—	—		Make It Hot
"I'm Lookin'"	2001	—	66	—	—	—	—		Non-album singles
"If I Was Your Girlfriend"	2004	—	57	—	—	—	—		Non-album singles
"I Like It"	2009	—	—	—	—	—	—		Non-album singles
"I Found You"	2011	—	—	—	—	—	—		Non-album singles
"Money"	2012	—	—	—	—	—	—		Lady
"Get Ready"	2013	—	—	—	—	—	—		Lady
"Good Lovin'"	2013	—	—	—	—	—	—		Lady
"Do It Again / In Love (Don't Mess Things Up)"	2016	—	—	—	—	—	—		Queen Alone
"Guilty"	2016	—	—	—	—	—	—		Queen Alone
"Smiling / Make Me Over"	2016	—	—	—	—	—	—		Queen Alone
"Underneath My Feet / Guilty"	2017	—	—	—	—	—	—		Queen Alone
"Piece of Me"	2019	—	—	—	—	—	32		Piece of Me
"Come On In"	2019	—	—	—	—	—	78		Piece of Me
"Storms"	2020	—	—	—	—	—	—		Piece of Me
"Games People Play"	2021	—	—	—	—	—	—		Piece of Me
"Under the Sun"	2021	—	—	—	—	—	—		Piece of Me
"Through It All"	2021	—	—	—	—	—	55		Piece of Me
"Best for Us"	2025	—	—	—	—	—	—		Cover Girl
"Be a Witness"	2025	—	—	—	—	—	82		Cover Girl
"Time"	2025	—	—	—	—	—	—		Cover Girl
"You're Gonna Win"	2025	—	—	—	—	—	—		Cover Girl
"My Best Step"	2025	—	—	—	—	—	—		Cover Girl
"Hard Times"	2025	—	—	—	—	—	—		Cover Girl
"Cover Girl"	2025	—	—	—	—	—	—		Cover Girl

=== As featured artist ===
List of singles, with selected chart positions and certifications, showing year released and album name
Title	Year	Peak chart positions				Certifications	Album
Title	Year	US	US R&B	UK	UK R&B	Certifications	Album
"I Like Control" (DJ Clue? featuring Missy Elliott, Mocha and Nicole Wray)	1999	—	81	—	—		The Professional
"All n My Grill" (Missy Elliott featuring Nicole Wray, MC Solaar or Big Boi)	1999	64	16	20	1	SNEP: Gold	Da Real World
"Don't Have To" (Pam & Dodi featuring Nicole Wray)	2002	—	—	—	—		Pam & Dodi
"Welcome Home" (Ol' Dirty Bastard featuring Nicole Wray)	2003	—	— (Note: "Welcome Home" did not enter the Hot R&B/Hip-Hop Songs but did peak at number 21 on the Bubbling Under R&B/Hip-Hop Songs chart on June 6, 2003.)	—	—		Non-album singles
"Do Your Thing" (Cam'ron featuring Nicole Wray)	2005	—	65	—	—		Non-album singles
"Good in the Hood" (JB featuring Nicole Wray and Quinn Mayback)	2009	—	—	—	—		Non-album singles
"Weekend" (G.Stax featuring Nicole Wray)	2016	—	—	—	—		Non-album singles
"Never Go Back" (Vincent John featuring Nicole Wray)	2016	—	—	—	—		Never Go Back - EP
"We Going Out" (DJ Morale featuring Nicole Wray, Donny Ray, & Kenny Wray)	2016	—	—	—	—		Non-album singles
"That's My Baby" (Daz featuring Nicole Wray)	2017	—	—	—	—		Non-album singles
"Tonight You Might" (Synthia featuring Lady Wray)	2019	—	—	—	—		Non-album singles

== Soundtrack appearances ==
Title	Year	Album
"Without You"	1998	Why Do Fools Fall in Love
"I Wanna Kiss You"	2003	Love Don't Cost a Thing
"Still Tippin' (It's a Man's World) (Remix)" (with Mike Jones)	2005	Hustle & Flow

== Album appearances ==
List of non-single guest appearances, with other performing artists, showing year released and album name
Title	Year	Performer(s)	Album
"Mama Don't Cry"	2002	54th Platoon featuring Nicole Wray	All or N.O.thin
"Family Ties"	2004	Cam'Ron featuring Nicole Wray	Purple Haze
"I Wanna Be Your Lady"	2004	The Diplomats featuring Nicole Wray	Diplomatic Immunity 2
"Rich Girlz"	2005	Lil' Nikki featuring Nicole Wray	The Preliminaries
"Good Is Bad"	2005	Fortunado featuring Nicole Wray	H82cme
"Love My Life"	2006	Cam'Ron featuring Nicole Wray	Killa Season
"Xtacy"	2006	J. R. Writer featuring Nicole Wray	History in the Making
"Gettin Money"	2007	Hurricane Chris featuring Nicole Wray	51/50 Ratchet
"Momma"	2007	Hurricane Chris featuring Nicole Wray	51/50 Ratchet
"Time"	2008	Cormega featuring Nicole Wray	Who Am I?
"Hope You're Happy"	2009	The Black Keys featuring Nicole Wray	Blakroc
"Done Did It"	2009	The Black Keys featuring Nicole Wray	Blakroc
"What You Do To Me"	2009	The Black Keys featuring Nicole Wray	Blakroc
"Why Can't I Forget Him"	2009	The Black Keys featuring Nicole Wray	Blakroc
"Get Out of My Way"	2009	Mikey Jay featuring Nicole Wray	A Dollar and a Dream
"No Mirror"	2009	Gucci Mane featuring Nicole Wray	So Icey Boy
"Everlasting Light"	2010	The Black Keys featuring Nicole Wray	Brothers
"Sinister Kid"	2010	The Black Keys featuring Nicole Wray	Brothers
"The End"	2010	Kid Cudi featuring Nicole Wray	Man on the Moon II: The Legend of Mr. Rager
"Gotta Let You Know"	2010	Tha Dogg Pound featuring Nicole Wray	100 Wayz
"Itza"	2011	Jim Jones featuring Nicole Wray	Capo
"Whiskey Sisters"	2011	McKenzie Eddy featuring Nicole Wray	A Prelude to My Next Excursion
"Collide"	2011	McKenzie Eddy featuring Nicole Wray	A Prelude to My Next Excursion
"Rosebud"	2011	McKenzie Eddy featuring Nicole Wray	Greatest Hits!!!
"The Story of"	2012	Drumma Boy featuring Nicole Wray	The Birth of D-Boy Fresh
"Honey"	2013	P-Money featuring Nicole Wray	Gratitude
"My Baby"	2013	P-Money featuring Nicole Wray	Gratitude
"Wicked Moon"	2013	Angel Haze featuring Nicole Wray	Reservation

== Music videos ==
- "Make It Hot" (featuring Missy Elliott and Mocha)
- "I Can't See" (featuring Missy Elliott and Mocha)
- "Eyes Better Not Wander"
- "All n My Grill" (Missy Elliott featuring Nicole Wray and Big Boi)
- "I'm Lookin'"
- "If I Was Your Girlfriend"
- "Love My Life" (Cam'Ron featuring Nicole Wray)
- "I Like It" (featuring 2 Chainz)
- "Get Ready"
- "Do It Again"
- "Smiling"
- "Underneath My Feet"
- "Under the Sun"
