= Keli Nicole Price =

American singer-songwriter

- Born: June 29, 1979 (age 47); Norfolk, Virginia, United States
- Genres: R&B; soul; gospel; hip-hop
- Occupations: Singer-songwriter; background vocalist; Music Industry Educator
- Labels: Price Tag, admin Calhoun Ent. / SESAC

Keli Nicole Price is an American singer-songwriter and background vocalist, best known for her work with producer Rodney "Darkchild" Jerkins and The Goldmind Inc. She has written for Beyoncé ("Deja Vu") and Angie Stone, among others.

== Songwriting and vocal credits ==
Credits are courtesy of Discogs, Spotify and AllMusic.

| Title | Year | Artist | Album |
|---|---|---|---|
| "Make It Hot" (Featuring Missy Elliott & Mocha) | 1998 | Nicole Wray | Make It Hot |
| "Hit 'Em wit da Hee" (Video Remix) (With Timbaland & Mocha) | 1998 | Missy Elliott | Supa Dupa Fly |
| "You're Gonna Get It" (Featuring Diamond Stone) | 2004 | Angie Stone | Stone Love |
| "Loretta" | 2005 | Will Smith | Lost and Found |
| "The Way I Love You" | 2006 | Tamia | Between Friends |
| "Can't Get Enough" | 2006 | Tamia | Between Friends |
| "Déjà Vu (Featuring Jay-Z) | 2006 | Beyoncé | B'Day |
| "Hold Me Down" | 2006 | Danity Kane | Danity Kane |
| "Let's Groove" | 2006 | B5 | That's So Raven Too! |
| "Ordinary Love" | 2007 | Paris Bennett | Princess P |
| "Hungover" | 2008 | Michelle Williams | Unexpected |
| "Let Freedom Reign" | 2008 | Sister Perri | Prophetic Flows Vol I & II |
| "He's Holy" | 2008 | Sister Perri | Prophetic Flows Vol I & II |
| "U'r My Friend" | 2008 | Sister Perri | Prophetic Flows Vol I & II |
| "Eventually" | 2011 | Double | Woman |
| "Escape" | 2019 | Simone Cardoso | S-95 |

== Background Vocals ==
List of appearances, with other performing artists, showing year released and album name
| Title | Year | Other performer(s) | Album |
|---|---|---|---|
| "O Lord" | 2008 | Sister Perri | Prophetic Flows Vol I & II |
| "Say No" | 2008 | Sister Perri | Prophetic Flows Vol I & II |
| "In My Soul" | 2008 | Sister Perri | Prophetic Flows Vol I & II |
| "I'll Worship U" | 2008 | Sister Perri | Prophetic Flows Vol I & II |

== Filmography ==
| Year | Title | Role | Notes |
|---|---|---|---|
| 2008 | Who Killed Bishop Brown? | Mother Mable | |

== Awards and nominations ==
| Year | Ceremony | Award | Result | Ref |
|---|---|---|---|---|
| 2007 | 49th Annual Grammy Awards | Best R&B Song (Déjà Vu) | Nominated | |
