= Me (Tamia song) =

Single by Tamia

from the album Between Friends
- Released: May 14, 2007
- Genre: R&B
- Length: 4:23
- Label: Plus One
- Songwriter: Shep Crawford
- Producer: Shep Crawford

Tamia singles chronology
"Can't Get Enough" (2006)	"Me" (2007)	"Almost" (2007)

"Me" is a song by Canadian recording artist Tamia. It was written and produced by Shep Crawford for the singer's second album A Nu Day (2000), but it did not make it into the final track list. However it was later included on her fourth studio album Between Friends (2006) and released as its second single in 2007, reaching number 29 on the US Hot R&B/Hip-Hop Songs chart.

== Background ==
"Me" was written and produced by frequent collaborator Shep Crawford. The song was initially conceived during the production of her second studio album A Nu Day (2000). On her decision to omit the song from the final track lisiting, Tamia elaborated in 2019: "I recorded "Stranger in My House" and "Me" at the same time. Both songs I really loved. But "Stranger" was this big record, so I decided to only put it on the A Nu Day album and I saved "Me" because I felt like it was too much of a good thing. I kept it and used it later."

== Music video ==
The music video for the song was directed by Canadian director Margaret Malandruccolo, who later shot the video for "Almost." The video begins with Tamia laying down on a bed until the questions about a lover arise. We then see hands and someone on the edge of the bed. Tamia later roams around the house. In the end she is shown standing up from a vanity revealing her pregnant belly.

== Track listing ==
Remix single
No.	Title	Producer(s)	Length
1.	"Me" (Rosabel's Anthem Vocal Mix)	Shep Crawford; Rosabel^{[a]}	8:56
2.	"Me" (Rosabel's Anthem Dub Mix)	Crawford; Rosabel^{[a]}	9:50
3.	"Me" (Soul Seekerz Remix)	Crawford; Soul Seekerz^{[a]}	7:23
4.	"Me" (Soul Seekerz Dirty Dub)	Crawford; Soul Seekerz^{[a]}	8:02

Notes

- ^{^[a]} denotes additional producer

== Credits and personnel ==
Credits adapted from the liner notes of Between Friends.

- Shep Crawford – instruments, production, writer
- Brian Gardner – mastering
- Tamia Hill – vocals
- Mike Sroka – engineering
- Dexter Simmons – mixing
- Rob Torres – guitar

== Charts ==
=== Weekly charts ===
Weekly chart performance for "Me"
Chart (2007–08)	Peak position
US Dance Club Songs (Billboard)	11
US Hot R&B/Hip-Hop Songs (Billboard)	29

=== Year-end charts ===
Year-end chart performance for "Me"
Chart (2007)	Position
US Adult R&B Songs (Billboard)	32
