= Open Access Button =

Browser bookmarklet

Open Access Button logo

The Open Access Button was a browser bookmarklet which registers when people hit a paywall to an academic article and cannot access it. It is supported by Medsin UK and the Right to Research Coalition.

A prototype was built at a BMJ Hack Weekend. All code is openly available online at GitHub.

A beta version of the Open Access Button was officially launched on 18 November 2013 at the Berlin 11 Satellite Conference for Students & Early Stage Researchers. It records instances of hitting a paywall, and also provides options to try to locate an open access version of the article. In April 2014 a crowdfunding campaign was started to build a second version.

The second version of the button was launched on 21 October 2014 as part of Open Access Week.

In February 2015 the Open Access Button and its co-founders, David Carroll and Joseph McArthur ("the button boys"), were awarded a SPARC Innovator Award by the Scholarly Publishing and Academic Resources Coalition (SPARC).

The third version of the button was launched on 28 October 2016, again, as part of open access week.

On September 18, 2025 OA.Works shut down the project.

== See also ==
- 12ft
- Anna's Archive
- Bypass Paywalls Clean
- EndNote Click
- Eprint button
- Unpaywall
