= Google Scholar =

Academic search service

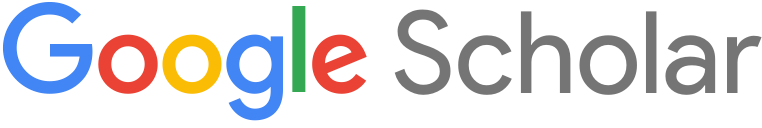

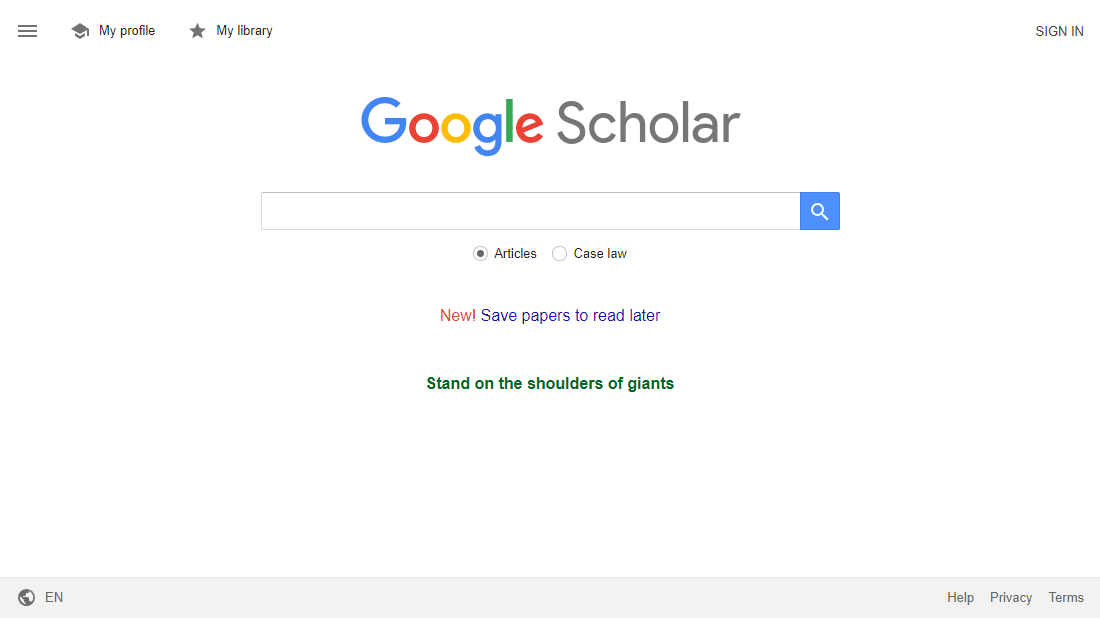
- Home page
- Website type: Bibliographic database
- Owner: Google
- Website: scholar.google.com
- Registration: Optional
- Launched: November 20, 2004; 21 years ago
- Current status: Active

Google Scholar is a freely accessible web search engine that indexes the full text or metadata of scholarly literature across an array of publishing formats and disciplines. Released in beta in November 2004, the Google Scholar index includes peer-reviewed online academic journals and books, conference papers, theses and dissertations, preprints, abstracts, technical reports, and other scholarly literature, including court opinions and patents.

Google Scholar uses a web crawler, or web robot, to identify files for inclusion in the search results. For content to be indexed in Google Scholar, it must meet certain specified criteria. An earlier statistical estimate published in PLOS One using a mark and recapture method estimated approximately 79–90% coverage of all articles published in English with an estimate of 100 million. This estimate also determined how many online documents were available. Google Scholar has been criticized for not vetting journals and for including predatory journals in its index.

The University of Michigan Library and other libraries whose collections Google scanned for Google Books and Google Scholar retained copies of the scans and have used them to create the HathiTrust Digital Library.

== History ==
Google Scholar arose out of a discussion between Alex Verstak and Anurag Acharya, both of whom were then working on building Google's main web index. Their goal was to "make the world's problem solvers 10% more efficient" by allowing easier and more accurate access to scientific knowledge. This goal is reflected in the Google Scholar's advertising slogan "Stand on the shoulders of giants", which was taken from an idea attributed to Bernard of Chartres, quoted by Isaac Newton, and is a nod to the scholars who have contributed to their fields over the centuries, providing the foundation for new intellectual achievements. One of the sources for the texts in Google Scholar is the University of Michigan's print collection.

Scholars have gained a range of features over time. In 2006, a citation importing feature was implemented supporting bibliography managers, such as RefWorks, RefMan, EndNote, and BibTeX. In 2007, Acharya announced that Google Scholar had started a program to digitize and host journal articles in agreement with their publishers, an effort separate from Google Books, whose scans of older journals do not include the metadata required for identifying specific articles in specific issues. In 2011, Google removed Scholar from the toolbars on its search pages, making it both less easily accessible and less discoverable for users not already aware of its existence. Around this period, sites with similar features such as CiteSeer, Scirus, and Microsoft Windows Live Academic search were developed. Some of these are now defunct; in 2016, Microsoft launched a new competitor, Microsoft Academic.

A major enhancement was rolled out in 2012, with the possibility for individual scholars to create personal "Scholar Citations profiles". A feature introduced in November 2013 allows logged-in users to save search results into the "Google Scholar library", a personal collection which the user can search separately and organize by tags. Via the "metrics" button, it reveals the top journals in a field of interest, and the articles generating these journal's impact can also be accessed. A metrics feature now supports viewing the impact of whole fields of science and academic journals. Google also included profiles for some posthumous academics, including Albert Einstein and Richard Feynman. For several years, the profile for Isaac Newton indicated he was as a "professor at MIT", with a "verified email at mit.edu".

== Features and specifications ==
Google Scholar allows users to search for digital or physical copies of articles, whether online or in libraries. It indexes "full-text journal articles, technical reports, preprints, theses, books, and other documents, including selected Web pages that are deemed to be 'scholarly'". Because many of Google Scholar's search results link to commercial journal articles, most people will be able to access only an abstract and the citation details of an article, and have to pay a fee to access the entire article. The most relevant results for the searched keywords will be listed first, in order of the author's ranking, the number of references that are linked to it and their relevance to other scholarly literature, and the ranking of the publication that the article appears in.

=== Groups and access to literature ===
Using its "group of" feature, it shows the available links to journal articles. In the 2005 version, this feature provided a link to both subscription-access versions of an article and to free full-text versions of articles; for most of 2006, it provided links to only the publishers' versions. Since December 2006, it has provided links to both published versions and major open access repositories, including all those posted on individual faculty web pages and other unstructured sources identified by similarity. On the other hand, Google Scholar does not allow to filter explicitly between toll access and open access resources, a feature offered Unpaywall and the tools which embed its data, such as Web of Science, Scopus and Unpaywall Journals, used by libraries to calculate the real costs and value of their collections.

=== Citation analysis and tools ===
Through its "cited by" feature, Google Scholar provides access to abstracts of articles that have cited the article being viewed. It is this feature in particular that provides the citation indexing previously only found in CiteSeer, Scopus, and Web of Science. Google Scholar also provides links so that citations can be either copied in various formats or imported into user-chosen reference managers such as Zotero.

"Scholar Citations profiles" are public author profiles that are editable by authors themselves. Individuals, logging on through a Google account with a bona fide address usually linked to an academic institution, can now create their own page giving their fields of interest and citations. Google Scholar automatically calculates and displays the individual's total citation count, h-index, and i10-index. According to Google, "three-quarters of Scholar search results pages ... show links to the authors' public profiles" as of August 2014.

=== Related articles ===
Through its "Related articles" feature, Google Scholar presents a list of closely related articles, ranked primarily by how similar these articles are to the original result, but also taking into account the relevance of each paper.

=== US legal case database ===
Google Scholar's legal database of US cases is extensive. Users can search and read published opinions of US state appellate and supreme court cases since 1950, US federal district, appellate, tax, and bankruptcy courts since 1923 and US Supreme Court cases since 1791. Google Scholar embeds clickable citation links within the case and the How Cited tab allows lawyers to research prior case law and the subsequent citations to the court decision.

== Ranking algorithm ==
While most academic databases and search engines allow users to select one factor (e.g. relevance, citation counts, or publication date) to rank results, Google Scholar ranks results with a combined ranking algorithm in a "way researchers do, weighing the full text of each article, the author, the publication in which the article appears, and how often the piece has been cited in other scholarly literature". Research has shown that Google Scholar puts high weight especially on citation counts, as well as words included in a document's title. In searches by author or year, the first search results are often highly cited articles, as the number of citations is highly determinant, whereas in keyword searches the number of citations is probably the factor with the most weight, but other factors also participate.

== Limitations and criticism ==
Some searchers found Google Scholar to be of comparable quality and utility to subscription-based databases when looking at citations of articles in some specific journals. The reviews recognize that its "cited by" feature in particular poses serious competition to Scopus and Web of Science. A study looking at the biomedical field found citation information in Google Scholar to be "sometimes inadequate, and less often updated". The coverage of Google Scholar may vary by discipline compared to other general databases. Google Scholar strives to include as many journals as possible, including predatory journals, which may lack academic rigor. Specialists on predatory journals say that these kinds of journals "have polluted the global scientific record with pseudo-science" and "that Google Scholar dutifully and perhaps blindly includes in its central index".

Google Scholar does not publish a list of journals crawled or publishers included, and the frequency of its updates is uncertain. Bibliometric evidence suggests Google Scholar's coverage of the sciences and social sciences is competitive with other academic databases; as of 2017, Scholar's coverage of the arts and humanities has not been investigated empirically and Scholar's utility for disciplines in these fields remains ambiguous. Especially early on, some publishers did not allow Scholar to crawl their journals. Elsevier journals have been included since mid-2007, when Elsevier began to make most of its ScienceDirect content available to Google Scholar and Google's web search. However, a 2014 study estimates that Google Scholar can find almost 90% (approximately 100 million) of all scholarly documents on the Web written in English. Large-scale longitudinal studies have found between 40% and 60% of scientific articles are available in full text via Google Scholar links.

Google Scholar puts high weight on citation counts in its ranking algorithm and therefore is being criticized for strengthening the Matthew effect; as highly cited papers appear in top positions they gain more citations while new papers hardly appear in top positions and therefore get less attention by the users of Google Scholar and hence fewer citations. Google Scholar effect is a phenomenon when some researchers pick and cite works appearing in the top results on Google Scholar regardless of their contribution to the citing publication because they automatically assume these works' credibility and believe that editors, reviewers, and readers expect to see these citations. Google Scholar has problems identifying publications on the arXiv preprint server correctly. Interpunctuation characters in titles produce wrong search results, and authors are assigned to wrong papers, which leads to erroneous additional search results. Some search results are even given without any comprehensible reason.

Google Scholar is vulnerable to spam. Researchers from the University of California, Berkeley and Otto-von-Guericke University Magdeburg demonstrated that citation counts on Google Scholar can be manipulated and complete non-sense articles created with SCIgen were indexed within Google Scholar. These researchers concluded that citation counts from Google Scholar should be used with care, especially when used to calculate performance metrics such as the h-index or impact factor, which is in itself a poor predictor of article quality. Google Scholar started computing an h-index in 2012 with the advent of individual Scholar pages. Several downstream packages like Harzing's Publish or Perish also use its data. The practicality of manipulating h-index calculators by spoofing Google Scholar was demonstrated in 2010 by Cyril Labbe from Joseph Fourier University, who managed to rank "Ike Antkare" ahead of Albert Einstein by means of a large set of SCIgen-produced documents citing each other (effectively an academic link farm). As of 2010, Google Scholar was not able to shepardize case law, as Lexis could. Unlike other indexes of academic work such as Scopus and Web of Science, Google Scholar does not maintain an Application Programming Interface that may be used to automate data retrieval. Use of web scrapers to obtain the contents of search results is also severely restricted by the implementation of CAPTCHAs. Google Scholar does not display or export Digital Object Identifiers (DOIs), a de facto standard implemented by all major academic publishers to uniquely identify and refer to individual pieces of academic work. In 2024, researchers found that Google Scholar was manipulatable through citation-purchasing services.

== Search engine optimization for Google Scholar ==
Search engine optimization (SEO) for traditional web search engines such as Google has been popular for many years. For several years, SEO has also been applied to academic search engines such as Google Scholar. SEO for academic articles is also called "academic search engine optimization" (ASEO) and defined as "the creation, publication, and modification of scholarly literature in a way that makes it easier for academic search engines to both crawl it and index it". ASEO has been adopted by several organizations, among them Elsevier, OpenScience, Mendeley, and SAGE Publishing, to optimize their articles' rankings in Google Scholar. ASEO has been criticised for allowing journals to artificially inflate their metrics and introducing spam into academic search engines.

== See also ==
- Bibliometrics
- List of academic databases and search engines
- Open-access repository
