= Between Friends (Tamia album) =

Studio album by Tamia
- Released: November 14, 2006
- Length: 60:10
- Label: Plus One
- Producer: Shep Crawford: Rodney "Darkchild" Jerkins; Phillip "P3" Scott

Tamia chronology
More (2004)	Between Friends (2006)	Beautiful Surprise (2012)

Between Friends is the fourth studio album by Canadian R&B singer Tamia. Her first project under her own independent label, Plus One Music Group, founded after her departure from Elektra Records in 2004, it was first released in South Africa on May 12, 2006, followed by a worldwide release in the fourth quarter of 2006. A departure from her third studio album More (2004), which included a diverse roster of collaborators, Tamia reteamed with frequent contributor Shep Crawford to work on most of the album, with its title referring to their working relationship and connection during the recording process.

The album received mixed reviews from critics, many of whom praised Tamia's vocal talents and the range of tracks but found the material too generic and uneven. Upon its US release, Between Friends debuted and peaked at number 66 on the Billboard Hot 200 and number nine on Billboard's Top R&B/Hip-Hop Albums, selling 18,000 copies in its first week. While it became her third consecutive top-ten album on the latter chart, it also marked Tamia's lowest-charting debut since her first album eight years prior as well as her lowest first week sales by then.

Between Friends produced three singles, including lead single "Can't Get Enough" and follow-up "Me", both of which became Tamia's highest-charting songs in five years, reaching the top thirty of Billboard's Hot R&B/Hip-Hop Songs. A third single, "Almost", entered the top forty of the Dance Club Songs chart.

During promotion for the album, a Christmas EP titled A Gift Between Friends was released on October 27, 2007.

== Background ==
In 2004, following several delays, Elektra Records released Tamia's third studio album, More. Her highest-charting release yet, it debuted at number seventeen on the US Billboard 200, selling 58,000 copies in its first week – the highest-selling week of her career up to that point. In addition, the album spawned three singles, including lead single "Officially Missing You" which scored moderate success however, reaching the top 40 on Billboard's Hot R&B/Hip-Hop Songs. Only a month before More's official release, Sylvia Rhone, the chairman of Elektra Records, was fired after Warner Music, Elektra's parent company, announced to cut 1,000 jobs among a round of executive exits and departmental restructuring. Rhone, who had been instrumental in Tamia's transition from Qwest to Elektra in the late-1990s, had served as the executive producer on More and previous album A Nu Day (2000) and worked closely with the singer. While Tamia denied rumors that she was seeking to leave the label, she recognized that "It's a scary time for me [...] I definitely was very shocked that Sylvia was let go."

The same year, following its sale by Time Warner, Elektra merged with Atlantic Records, another Warner Music Group label, to form the Atlantic Records Group. At about the same time, Tamia's recording deal was up for renewal and though she was in a position to re-sign with the label, the singer chose to leave the company following her transition. In order to gain more creative control over future projects, she decided to go independent and found her own record label, Plus One Music Group. With Tamia envisioning a consistent, "classic R&B" album, concentrating on "melodies and the songs and the emotion" rather than the producers or "big waves and dips", unlike previous projects, she only consulted longtime contributor Shep Crawford to work with her on her fourth studio album. An intimate process, the pair met on a daily basis in an Orlando recording studio to write and produce new songs "from scratch." During their sessions, Rodney "Darkchild" Jerkins called Tamia after he had heard that she was in the studio, and convinced her to record additional material with him in Atlantic City. Alluding to her working relationship with Crawford and the creation process of the album, it was eventually titled Between Friends.

== Release and reception ==
Professional ratings
Review scores
Source	Rating
About.com	3/5 stars
AllMusic	3.5/5 stars

As Tamia was able to arrange deals with international distributors at different times, Between Friends was first released through Gallo Record Company in South Africa on May 12, 2006 – several months before its arrival in the United States, Tamia's main selling market. Elsewhere, the album was released in November and December 2006 via Image Entertainment, Blacksmith Entertainment, and Universal Music Canada. While the original version, released in South Africa, comprised eleven tracks, the international version featured four additional tracks that were produced by Shep Crawford, including "Have to Go Through It", a duet with Eric Benet, "Sittin' on the Job" and "Become Us" as well as the single "Almost".

Between Friends received generally mixed to positive reviews from music critics. Allmusic wrote that "with production help from Shep Crawford and Rodney Jerkins, Between Friends offers up a range of tracks, including bouncy club numbers, sensual love songs, and mainstream pop and R&B. But while the music sounds great, it is Tamia's instrument that takes center stage throughout," adding that the album "is packed to the gills with displays of the artist's spectacular, elastic vocal talent." In his review for About.com writer Mark Edward Nero remarked that on Between Friends, "Tamia fails to do enough to distinguish herself from the legions of other pretty-faced/moderately talented singers out there". He felt that her "clear, strong voice" lacked "strong emotive abilities, a wide vocal range, distinctive singing style and much of a personality".

== Track listing ==
Between Friends – International edition
No.	Title	Writer(s)	Standard edition(s)	Length
1.	"The Way I Love You"	Anesha Birchett; Antea Birchett; Rodney Jerkins; Keli Nicole Price; Delisha Thomas	Jerkins	4:02
2.	"Happy"	Shep Crawford; Kenya Ivey	Crawford	5:11
3.	"Almost"	Crawford	Crawford	3:41
4.	"Too Grown"	LaShawn Daniels; Jerkins	Jerkins	3:55
5.	"Me"	Crawford	Crawford	4:23
6.	"Can't Get Enough"	Daniels; Fred Jerkins III; Jerkins	Jerkins	3:49
7.	"Day Dreaming"	Aretha Franklin	Crawford	3:21
8.	"Sittin' on the Job"	Tamia Hill; Crawford	Crawford	2:33
9.	"Last First Kiss"	Shalonda Crawford; Shep Crawford	Crawford; Phillip "P3" Scott	4:41
10.	"Why Can't It Be"	Hill; Crawford	Crawford	3:04
11.	"When a Woman"	Crawford	Crawford	4:18
12.	"Become Us"	Hill; Crawford	Crawford	4:44
13.	"Have to Go Through It" (featuring Eric Benét)	Crawford	Crawford	3:49
14.	"Please Protect My Heart"	Hill; Crawford; Nora Payne	Crawford	3:20
15.	"Love and I"	Crawford	Crawford	5:19
Total length:				60:10

Between Friends – South African edition
No.	Title	Writer(s)	Producer(s)	Length
1.	"The Way I Love You"	Anesha Birchett; Antea Birchett; Rodney Jerkins; Keli Nicole Price; Delisha Thomas	Rodney "Darkchild" Jerkins	4:02
2.	"Happy"	Shep Crawford; Kenya Ivey	Crawford	5:11
3.	"Too Grown"	Daniels; Jerkins	Jerkins	3:55
4.	"Me"	Crawford	Crawford	4:23
5.	"Can't Get Enough"	Daniels; Jerkins	Jerkins	3:49
6.	"Day Dreaming"	Aretha Franklin	Crawford	3:21
7.	"Last First Kiss"	Shalonda Crawford; Shep Crawford	Crawford; Phillip "P3" Scott	4:41
8.	"When a Woman"	Crawford	Crawford	4:18
9.	"Why Can't It Be"	Hill; Crawford	Crawford	3:04
10.	"Please Protect My Heart"	Hill; Crawford; Nora Payne	Crawford	3:20
11.	"Love and I"	Crawford	Crawford	5:19
Total length:				42:03

Notes

- "Day Dreaming" is stylized as "Daydreamin" on digital services.

== Personnel ==
Performance credits

- Tamia Hill – lead vocals, background vocals
- Anesha Birchett – background vocals
- Shalonda Crawford – background vocals
- Kenya Ivey – background vocals
- Lisa Ivey – background vocals
- Agape Jerry – guitar
- Nora Payne – background vocals
- Bryan Russell – bass guitar
- Robert Torres – guitar
- Jonathan Webb – bass guitar

Technical and production

- Shep Crawford – executive producer, composer
- Brian Gardner – mastering
- Fred Jerkins III – composer
- Rodney Jerkins – audio production, composer
- Mike Sroka – engineer
- Gabriel Varde – tracking

== Charts ==
=== Weekly charts ===
Weekly chart performance for Between Friends
Chart (2006)	Peak position
Japanese Albums (Oricon)	81
US Billboard 200	66
US Independent Albums (Billboard)	2
US Top R&B/Hip-Hop Albums (Billboard)	9

=== Year-end charts ===
Year-end chart performance for Between Friends
Chart (2007)	Position
US Top R&B/Hip-Hop Albums (Billboard)	55

== Release history ==
List of release dates, showing region, formats, label, distributor, editions, catalog number and reference
Region	Date	Format(s)	Label	Distributor	Edition(s)	Ref
South Africa	May 12, 2006	CD; digital download	Plus 1 Music Group	Gallo Record Company	Standard	
United States	November 14, 2006	CD; digital download	Plus 1 Music Group	Image Entertainment	Standard	
United Kingdom	November 20, 2006	CD; digital download	Plus 1 Music Group	Blacksmith Entertainment	Standard	
Japan	November 22, 2006	CD; digital download	Plus 1 Music Group; Handcuts Records	Universal Music	Standard	
Canada	December 5, 2006	CD; digital download	Plus 1 Music Group	Blacksmith Entertainment; Universal Music	Standard	
United States	October 27, 2007	CD; digital download	Plus 1 Music Group	Image Entertainment	Reissue	
