= 12ft =

Defunct website for bypassing paywalls

- Website type: No JavaScript proxy browser
- Owner: Thomas Millar
- Website: 12ft.io
- Commercial: No
- Registration: No

12 ft.io was a website that allowed users to selectively browse any site with JavaScript disabled. It also allowed some online paywalls to be bypassed. It was owned by its creator Thomas Millar.

In November 2023, its hosting platform Vercel took the website offline. It was back online the following month. On July 17, 2025, the News Media Alliance reported that it had taken down the website.

== Blocking ==
Some websites had blocked 12 ft, such as Bloomberg and The New York Times.

== Function ==
The website's name is based on the phrase "show me a 10 foot wall and I'll show you a 12 foot ladder." It bypassed paywalls by pretending to be a search engine crawler when requesting a webpage.

== Outage history ==
On August 31, 2022, the site was offline, with Vercel displaying a "DEPLOYMENT DISABLED" message and returning an HTTP 451 status code. The site came back online on September 1, but was disabled again on September 10. The site was available again as of September 11, but was no longer showing cached versions of pages for NYTimes.com, instead displaying a message of "12ft has been disabled for this site". On July 30, 2023, the site's security certificate appeared to be invalid. The certificate in question was issued by Cisco Umbrella Secondary SubCA lax-SG with an expiration date of August 3.

On November 2, 2023, the site only displayed an error 402 with a message "402: Payment Required. This Deployment has been disabled. Your connection is working correctly. Vercel is working correctly." Thomas Millar announced on X that provider Vercel had removed his account access, and Vercel's CEO quickly replied that this was because they had broken their Terms of Service. It was back online the following month.

On July 17, 2025, the News Media Alliance reported that it had taken down the website.

Data from UpDownToday show that 12 ft.io was last recorded as available on March 27, 2024, and last recorded as down on December 11, 2025; as of March 4, 2026, the domain was listed as returning a 404 status code.

== See also ==
- Bypass Paywalls Clean – Browser extension to circumvent paywalls
- Open Access Button – Browser bookmarklet
- Unpaywall – Nonprofit organization
