= Bypass Paywalls Clean =

Browser extension to circumvent paywalls

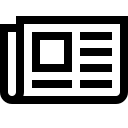
- Original author: iamadamdev
- Developer: magnolia1234
- License: MIT License
- Repository: gitflic.ru/user/magnolia1234

Bypass Paywalls Clean (BPC) is a free and open-source web browser extension that circumvents paywalls.

== Characteristics ==
Developed by magnolia1234, the extension uses techniques such as clearing cookies and showing content from web archives. The extension supports Mozilla Firefox and Google Chrome. Other browsers such as Safari and Brave are supported with third-party adblockers as long as the BPC filterlist and the userscript are imported.

== DMCA takedown notices ==
Due to a conflict with Google's rules, Bypass Paywalls Clean is not published on the Chrome Web Store. Bypass Paywalls Clean was published on the Add-ons for Firefox website until a DMCA takedown notice was leveled against the Firefox extension in February 2023. The extension was originally released on GitLab before it was removed in April 2024, when a DMCA takedown notice was filed against its source code repository. Subsequently, magnolia1234 migrated Bypass Paywalls Clean to GitHub, where it was targeted by another DMCA takedown notice submitted by the News Media Alliance, resulting in GitHub restricting downloads of the software and its 3,879 forks in August 2024.

The project is currently being maintained and released on GitFlic, a Git forge by Russian technology company RusBITech.

== See also ==
- 12ft
- Anti-circumvention § United States
- Open Access Button
- OurResearch § Unpaywall
