= Can't Get Enough (Tamia song) =

Single by Tamia

from the album Between Friends
- Released: 2006
- Genre: R&B
- Length: 3:48
- Label: Plus One
- Songwriters: LaShawn Daniels; Fred Jerkins III; Keli Nicole Price; Rodney Jerkins
- Producer: Rodney Jerkins

Tamia singles chronology
"Still" (2004)	"Can't Get Enough" (2006)	"Me" (2007)

"Can't Get Enough" is a song by Canadian recording artist Tamia. It was written by LaShawn Daniels, Fred Jerkins III, Rodney "Darkchild" Jerkins and Keli Nicole Price for her fourth album Between Friends (2006), while production was helmed by the latter. The song was released as the album's lead single in 2006. It reached number 26 on the US Billboard Hot R&B/Hip-Hop Songs chart.

== Music video ==
An accompanying music video for "Can't Get Enough" was directed by American filmmaker Darren Grant. It marked his second collaboration with Tamia. Filmed in Miami on October 2, 2006, Tamia cited the clip as one of her "favorite videos," telling Singersroom: "I’m just really excited about the video. I think it’s beautiful. Darren did an awesome job [...] It’s a different look for me, I dyed my hair dark. The make-up is very minimal. It’s beautiful in a natural sort of way. Natural to me, as in three hours of make-up!"

== Track listing ==
CD single
No.	Title	Length
1.	"Can't Get Enough" (Album Version)	3:48
2.	"Can't Get Enough" (Instrumental)	3:48

== Credits and personnel ==
Credits adapted from the liner notes of Between Friends.

- Anesha Birchett – backing vocals
- Keli Nicole Price – writer
- LaShawn Daniels – writer
- Brian Gardner – mastering
- Tamia Hill – vocals, writer
- Fred Jerkins III – writer
- Rodney Jerkins – instruments, production, writer
- Dexter Simmons – mixing
- Jeff Villanueva – recording
- Jon Webb – bass guitar

== Charts ==
=== Weekly charts ===
Chart (2006–2007)	Peak position
US Hot R&B/Hip-Hop Songs (Billboard)	26

=== Year-end charts ===
Chart (2007)	Position
US Adult R&B Songs (Billboard)	16
US Hot R&B/Hip-Hop Songs (Billboard)	79
