= Almost (Tamia song) =

Single by Tamia

from the album Between Friends
- Released: November 13, 2007
- Genre: R&B
- Length: 3:41
- Label: Plus One
- Songwriter(s): Shep Crawford
- Producer(s): Shep Crawford

Tamia singles chronology
"Me" (2007)	"Almost" (2007)	"Beautiful Surprise" (2012)

"Almost" is a song by Canadian singer Tamia. It was written and produced by Shep Crawford for the singer's fourth album Between Friends and released as its third and final single in 2007, reaching number 59 on the US Hot R&B/Hip-Hop Songs chart. The music video for the song was directed by Margaret Malandruccolo, who also shot the video for Tamia's previous single "Me".

== Track listing ==
CD single
No.	Title	Length
1.	"Almost" (album version)	3:41
2.	"Almost" (instrumental)	3:41

== Credits and personnel ==
Credits adapted from the liner notes of Between Friends.

- Brian Gardner – mastering
- Shalonda Crawford – backing vocals
- Shep Crawford – instruments, production, writer
- Tamia Hill – vocals, backing vocals
- Dexter Simmons – mixing
- Mike Sroka – recording
- Isaiah "Zay" Thomas – backing vocals

== Charts ==
Chart performance for "Almost"
Chart (2007)	Peak position
US Hot R&B/Hip-Hop Songs (Billboard)	59
