= Tell Me Who =

Single by Tamia

from the album A Nu Day
- Released: May 1, 2001
- Length: 4:49
- Label: Elektra
- Songwriters: Shep Crawford; Tamia Washington
- Producer: Shep Crawford

Tamia singles chronology
"Stranger in My House" (2001)	"Tell Me Who" (2001)	"Into You" (2003)

"Tell Me Who" is a song by Canadian recording artist Tamia. It was written by Tamia and frequent collaborator Shep Crawford for her second studio album, A Nu Day (2000), while production was helmed by the latter. Released as the album's third and final single in May 2001, it peaked at number two on the US Billboard Dance Club Play chart.

== Personnel ==
Personnel are adapted from the liner notes of A Nu Day.

- Merlin Bobb – executive production
- Anne Catalino – recording, mixing
- Anthony "Shep" Crawford – instruments, production, writing
- Sylvia Rhone – executive production
- Tamia Washington – vocals, writer
- Jay Williams – guitar

== Charts ==
=== Weekly charts ===
Chart (2001)	Peak position
US Dance Club Play (Billboard)	2
US Hot R&B/Hip-Hop Singles & Tracks (Billboard)	63

=== Year-end charts ===
Chart (2001)	Position
US Dance Club Play (Billboard)	25
