= List of public domain resources behind a paywall =

This is a list of significant public domain resources that are behind a paywall, in other words information which it is legal under copyright law for anyone to copy and distribute, but which are currently charged for on the Internet. Notable categories are some government publications, including legal documents, works on which copyright has expired, including paintings and other artworks, books and journals. In the case of printed works there is often some availability from libraries. Some works may be mirrored by activists on-line, such action may be legal from a copyright point of view, but contrary to the terms and conditions of the site hosting the paywalled information.

== United States ==
In the United States, all work of the federal government (with a few exceptions) and all items published prior to January 1, 1931 are in the public domain, as are any items published without a complete copyright notice before 1988 or any items published from December 31, 1963, or earlier that did not have their copyrights renewed. (see: public domain in the United States)

- United States federal court documents stored on the PACER system.
- Los Angeles Times archive
- The Washington Post archive from 1877
- The Atlanta Journal-Constitution archive from 1868
- The Christian Science Monitor archive from 1908
- The Boston Globe archive from 1872
- Hartford Courant from 1764
- Chicago Tribune from 1852
- The New York Times archive from 1851
- National Centers for Environmental Information records
- The Miami Herald

== United Kingdom ==
- The National Archives archive
