= Anurag Acharya =

Indian-American engineer

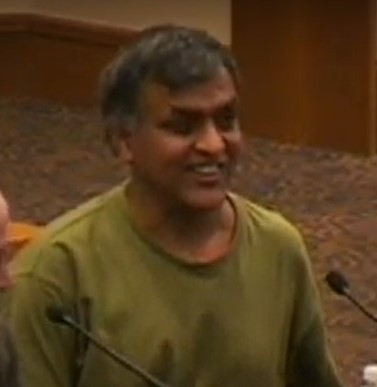
- Acharya (2010)
- Education: Indian Institute of Technology Kharagpur; Carnegie Mellon University
- Known for: Google Scholar
- Scientific career
- Fields: Software engineering
- Institutions: Google
- Thesis: Scalability in Production System Programs (1994)

Acharya (2010)

Anurag Acharya is an Indian-American engineer known for co-founding Google Scholar, of which he has been described as the "key inventor". As of 2023, Acharya held the title of Distinguished Engineer at Google. He and his Google colleague Alex Verstak co-founded Google Scholar in 2004. Acharya got the idea for the project years earlier when he was an undergraduate at the Indian Institute of Technology Kharagpur and had difficulty quickly accessing scholarly literature. He received a Distinguished Alumnus Award from the Indian Institute of Technology Kharagpur in 2016.
