= A Nu Day =

Studio album by Tamia
- Released: October 10, 2000
- Length: 53:26
- Label: Elektra
- Producers: Dallas Austin; Bink!; Shep Crawford; Missy Elliott; Errol "Poppi" McCalla; Jazz Nixon

Tamia chronology
Tamia (1998)	A Nu Day (2000)	More (2004)

Singles from A Nu Day
- 1. "Can't Go for That" Released: August 1, 2000; 2. "Stranger In My House" Released: October 9, 2000; 3. "Tell Me Who" Released: May 1, 2001

A Nu Day is the second studio album by Canadian recording artist Tamia. It was released by Elektra Records on October 10, 2000, following her transition from Qwest Records. A less ballad-driven collection of songs and more progressive approach than her debut effort, Tamia worked with a smaller number of songwriters and producers on the album, including Dallas Austin, Shep Crawford, Missy Elliott, Bink!, Errol "Poppi" McCalla, and Jazz Nixon, some of whom would become frequent collaborators on subsequent albums. As with Tamia, a cover version, DeBarge's 1983 single "Love Me in a Special Way", was also recorded for the album.

Upon its release, A Nu Day received a mixed response from critics, who complimented Tamia's transition from the adult contemporary sound on her debut album to a more stylish contemporary urban soul but found the material inconsistent. The album debuted and peaked at number forty-six on the Billboard 200 chart and became her first entry on the Top R&B/Hip-Hop Albums, peaking at number eight. A steady seller, it was eventually certified gold by the RIAA, and remains her highest-selling album in the United States. Similarly, A Nu Day produced three of Tamia's commercially most successful singles, including her first US Billboard Hot 100 top ten hit single "Stranger in My House". A Nu Day was nominated in the R&B/Soul Recording of the Year category at the 2001 Juno Awards.

== Background ==
In 1994, Tamia signed her first recording deal with Warner Bros. Records and collaborated with veteran producer Quincy Jones on his album Q's Jook Joint (1995). Their output, the singles "You Put a Move on My Heart" and "Slow Jams", as well as "Missing You", a song Tamia recorded with Brandy, Gladys Knight, and Chaka Khan for the soundtrack of the 1996 motion picture Set It Off, each earned her nominations at the 39th Annual Grammy Awards. She later co-signed with Jones's Qwest Records label, a joint venture with Warner Bros., on which her self-titled debut album was released in 1998. Upon its release, Tamia received a mixed to positive reception by critics and garnered the singer two Juno Award nominations for Best New Solo Artist and R&B/Soul Recording of the Year at the 1999 award ceremony. In addition, it peaked at number sixty-seven on the Billboard 200 chart, selling 416,000 copies in the United States, and was eventually certified gold in Japan for 100,000 copies shipped to stores.

Frustrated by Qwest's label politics which prevented her form recording and releasing music in a shorter amount of time, Tamia transitioned to Elektra Records the following year, a decision she declared as "fairly easy" since Elektra was also owned by Warner. The company envisioned to establish her as their long-term urban signature act – similar to Mariah Carey and Whitney Houston, who enjoyed major commercial success with Virgin and Arista Records at that time. As a result, Elektra chairman/CEO Sylvia Rhone enlisted rapper-producer Missy "Misdemeanor" Elliott and frequent co-producer Bink to work with Tamia on her second studio album. Musically, their songs would mark a shift for Tamia who declared A Nu Day ″not as ballad-driven as" her debut album and felt it was "more aggressive in terms of the formats of the songs." Next to Elliott and Bink, the singer worked with Dallas Austin and Shep Crawford on most of the album, the latter of who would become a frequent collaborator on her following albums.

== Critical reception ==
Professional ratings
Review scores
Source	Rating
AllMusic	3/5 stars
Entertainment Weekly	C−
NME	3/5 stars

In his review for Billboard, Michael Paoletta called A Nu Day "a stunning new set", which cemented her appeal as "one of tomorrow's divas". Satisfied with the songs, he wrote that "Tamia, all grown up on her latest set, is definitely ready to seize the day". Jose F. Promis from AllMusic rated the album three out of five stars. He declared the album "a nice pop-R&B record that doesn't set off to break much new ground [but] provides for a pleasurable and unchallenging listening experience." Q magazine remarked that A Nu Day was dominated by "sass over schmaltz [...] the Missy Elliot-enhanced take on Hall & Oates' "I Can't Go for That" [...] is a high spot [with] echoes of Jill Scott in some of other jazzier tracks."

Vincent Jackson, writing for NME, called the album a "dreary set" that "rarely lends itself to excitement and originality". He felt that A Nu Day is the kind of MOR musical traffic that only real hardcore R&B heads would want to get stuck in". Less impressed, Entertainment Weekly's Craig Seymour wrote that A Nu Day sees Tamia joining "the Toni Braxton school of hammy, self-conscious soul-singing that's more about affectation than honest emotion". He added that "Elliott pitches in with staccato beats and street-savvy lyrics, but Tamia's cloying wails lack edge and conviction. She turns even the most heartsick and angry sentiments into prettified pain". People found that with A Nu Day, Tamia "again struggles to distinguish herself as an artist in her own right". Critical with Elliott's productions, which the magazine considered "more Missy than Tamia", they praised the ballads on the album. Vibe editor Craig D. Frazier found that "overall, Tamia's sophomore effort is a refreshing change from the redundant styles that female singers have plastered all over the radio. Hopefully, this album will attract the attention her debut failed to garner."

== Release and performance ==
Promotional touring for A Nu Day began on September 5, 2000. Tamia visited retail, radio, press, and local video outlets in support of the album; she also performed at NetNoir's fifth anniversary celebration in New York City and at the Detroit Female Wellness Tour, sponsored by Procter & Gamble, Honey magazine, and BET Networks. In addition, Elektra set up a number of "Win it before you can buy it" contests with radio, as well as a "Call to win" contest with The Box television network. Elektra launched a website for the singer that featured new music and links to fan-related sites; e-cards featuring Tamia were also sent out to fans who registered with the Elektra database. Tamia also appeared on several television shows, including a performance on The WB sitcom For Your Love as well as Soul Train.

In the United States, A Nu Day debuted and peaked at number 46 on the Billboard 200 album chart. The album also debuted at number eight on Billboard's Top R&B/Hip-Hop Albums, becoming her first top ten entry on the chart. Tamia's most commercially successful album to date, A Nu Day sold over 665,000 copies in the United States and was eventually certified gold by the Recording Industry Association of America (RIAA), indicating sales in excess of 500,000 copies. The album produced three singles, including lead single, "Can't Go For That," her hit single "Stranger In My House," which reached number 10 on the US Billboard Hot 100, and "Tell Me Who," which reached number two on Billboard's Dance Club Songs chart.

== Track listing ==
A Nu Day – Standard edition
No.	Title	Writer(s)	Producer(s)	Length
1.	"Interlude"	Shep Crawford; Shae Jones	Crawford	1:05
2.	"Dear John"	Jazz Nixon	Nixon	4:34
3.	"Can't Go for That"	Missy "Misdemeanor" Elliott; Roosevelt Harrell; Brycyn Evans; Sara Allen; Daryl Hall; John Oates	Bink!; Elliott^{[A]}; Evans^{[A]}	3:46
4.	"Go"	Dallas Austin; Jasper Cameron	Austin	4:19
5.	"Love Me in a Special Way"	Eldra DeBarge	Crawford	4:50
6.	"Long Distance Love"	Elliott; Errol McCalla	Elliott; Poppi	4:44
7.	"Stranger in My House"	Crawford; Jones	Crawford	4:46
8.	"Wanna Be"	Elliott; Harrell	Bink!; Elliott^{[A]}	3:18
9.	"Un'h... to You"	Kisa; Harry W. Casey; Richard Finch; Rick James; Keith Murray; Erick Sermon	Shep Crawford	4:12
10.	"Can't No Man"	Elliott; McCalla	Elliott; Poppi	4:00
11.	"Tell Me Who"	Crawford; Tamia Washington	Crawford	4:49
12.	"If I Were You"	Crawford; Jones; Stacy Dove Daniels	Crawford	5:17
13.	"Can't Go for That" (Remix featuring 213)	Elliott; Harrell; Evans; Allen; Hall; Oates; Calvin Broadus; Warren Griffin; Nathaniel Hale	Bink!; Elliott^{[A]}	3:46
Total length:				53:26

A Nu Day – Japanese edition
No.	Title	Writer(s)	Producer(s)	Length
14.	"Single"	Kelly Price	Crawford	3:57
Total length:				57:23

Notes

- ^{^[A]} denotes co-producer

Sample credits

- "Can't Go for That" contains a sample of "I Can't Go for That (No Can Do)" performed by Hall & Oates.
- "Love Me in a Special Way" is a cover of DeBarge's same-titled song.
- "Un'h...To You" contains a sample of "I Get Lifted" performed by George McCrae and Keith Murray's "Get Lifted"

== Personnel ==
Performance credits

- Tamia Washington – lead vocals, background vocals
- Debra Killings – background vocals
- Fernando Pullum – horn
- Jay Williams – guitar
- Pam Olivia – background vocals
- Professa – guitar, electric Guitar
- Clinta Turner – background vocals
- Rhemario Webber – keyboards

Technical and production

- Dallas Austin – producer
- Merlin Bobb – executive producer
- Chris Gehringer – mastering
- Sylvia Rhone – executive producer
- Rick Sheppard – MIDI, sound design
- Missy Elliott – producer
- Bill Importico – engineer
- Carlton Lynn – engineer, digital editing
- Lili Picou – art direction
- Anne Catalino – engineer
- Shep Crawford – producer
- David "D-Lo" Lopez – engineer

== Charts ==
=== Weekly charts ===
Weekly chart performance for A Nu Day
Chart (2000)	Peak position
Canadian R&B Albums (Nielsen SoundScan)	28
US Billboard 200	46
US Top R&B/Hip-Hop Albums (Billboard)	8

=== Year-end charts ===
Year-end chart performance for A Nu Day
Chart (2001)	Position
US Billboard 200	177
US Top R&B/Hip-Hop Albums (Billboard)	48

== Certifications ==
Certifications for A Nu Day
Region	Certification	Certified units/sales
United States (RIAA)	Gold	500,000^{^}
^{^} Shipments figures based on certification alone.
