= Queen Alone =

2016 studio album by Lady Wray

Studio album by Lady Wray
- Released: September 23, 2016
- Recorded: 2014–2016
- Studios: The Diamond Mine (Queens, New York)
- Genres: R&B; soul
- Length: 34:53
- Label: Big Crown Records
- Producers: Leon Michels; Thomas Brenneck

Lady Wray chronology
Make It Hot (1998)	Queen Alone (2016)	Piece of Me (2022)

Queen Alone is the second studio album by American singer Nicole Wray, released on September 23, 2016, by Big Crown Records. This is her first solo album in 18 years since her last album Make It Hot and her first under a new name, Lady Wray.

== Background and development ==
In 2009, Wray formed a musical duo called Lady, with English R&B singer Terri Walker. In 2012, the duo toured as the background vocalists for Lee Fields and the Expressions during his international tour. During the tour, Lady recorded their self-titled album and released it in March 2013 on Truth and Soul Records. Heavily influenced by late-'60s and early-'70s soul music, their album spawned three singles: "Money", "Get Ready", and "Good Lovin'". After Walker left the duo during their tour in mid-2013, Wray retitled the music act "Lady, the Band" and continued on with the addition of two background singers for the conclusion of the tour. After the roster move from Truth and Soul Records to Big Crown Records, Wray adopted the stage name Lady Wray.

== Recording and production ==
Lady Wray began recording the album in 2014. The album was recorded at The Diamond Mine, a private recording studio founded by Leon Michels and Thomas Brenneck in Queens, New York. Continuing the sound of Lady, her album with Terri Walker, Queen Alone contains a mix of contemporary R&B and 60s/70s retro soul. Each song was written by Wray and produced by Leon Michels and Tom Brenneck.

"Smiling" was the first song recorded for the album. Wray originally wrote "Do It Again" for Lee Fields' album Special Night but retained the song after being encouraged by Michels and Brenneck. "Do It Again" would go on to serve as the lead single, released on June 10, 2016.

== Track listing ==
No.	Title	Length
1.	"It's Been a Long Time"	2:59
2.	"Do It Again"	3:59
3.	"Smiling"	3:19
4.	"Guilty"	3:34
5.	"In Love (Don't Mess Things Up)"	2:17
6.	"Make Me Over"	2:24
7.	"Cut Me Loose"	3:27
8.	"Underneath My Feet"	2:39
9.	"They Won't Hang Around"	3:53
10.	"Bad Girl"	2:43
11.	"Let It Go"	3:39

== Personnel ==
Credits for Queen Alone adapted from album liner notes.

- Thomas Brenneck — guitar, bass, vocals, percussion, producer, engineering, mixing
- Alecia Chakour – backing vocals
- JJ Golden — mastering
- Dave Guy — trumpet
- Vince John — piano
- Ray Mason — trombone
- Leon Michels — drums, guitar, keyboards, saxophone, flute, percussion, vocals, producer, engineering, mixing
- Danny Miller — design
- Nick Movshon — bass, drums
- Toby Pazner — piano
- Paul Schalda – backing vocals
- William Schalda Jr. – backing vocals
- Max Shrager — drums
- Homer Steinweiss — drums
- Saundra Williams – backing vocals
- Lady Wray — lead vocals, backing vocals
