= Piece of Me (Lady Wray album) =

Studio album by Lady Wray
- Released: January 28, 2022
- Recorded: 2018–2021
- Studio: The Legendary Diamond Mine; Diamond Mine North
- Genre: R&B; soul
- Length: 42:42
- Label: Big Crown Records
- Producer: Leon Michels

Lady Wray chronology
Queen Alone (2016)	Piece of Me (2022)	Cover Girl (2025)

Piece of Me is the third studio album by American singer Lady Wray, released on January 28, 2022, by Big Crown Records.

== Recording and production ==
In 2018, Lady Wray began recording Piece of Me. Leon Michels and Thomas Brenneck produced the entire album, most of which was recorded at Michels' home studio. Wray's father Kenneth Wray Sr. appears on the song "Beauty in the Fire". The song "Melody" features Wray's daughter Melody Bascote.

== Singles ==
In April 2019, Wray released the title-track single "Piece of Me". In August 2019, she released another single called "Come On In". In October 2020, the single "Storms" was released. In June 2021, she released "Games People Play". In October 2021, Wray released the single "Under the Sun", along with its music video. In November 2021, "Through It All" was released as the following single. In December 2021, "Thank You" was released as a single.

== Track listing ==
All songs written by Nicole Wray and produced by Leon Michels.

Piece of Me track listing
No.	Title	Length
1.	"I Do"	3:00
2.	"Through It All"	3:24
3.	"Piece of Me"	3:44
4.	"Come On In"	3:38
5.	"Under the Sun"	3:21
6.	"Where Were You"	4:16
7.	"Beauty in the Fire" (featuring Kenneth Wray Sr.)	3:29
8.	"Games People Play"	3:41
9.	"Melody" (featuring Melody Bloom Bascote)	3:48
10.	"Thank You"	3:26
11.	"Joy & Pain"	3:43
12.	"Storms"	3:11

== Personnel ==
Credits adapted from album jacket notes.

- Nicole Wray – vocals
- Leon Michels – guitar, bass, drums, keyboards, saxophone, flute, percussion, vocals
- Nick Movshon – bass, drums
- Homer Steinweiss – drums
- Dylan Nowick – guitar, drums
- Paul Spring – guitar
- Kevin Martin – vocals
- Dave Guy – trumpet
- Marco Benevento – piano
- Max Shrager – guitar

== Charts ==
Chart performance for Piece of Me
Chart (2022)	Peak position
UK Independent Albums (OCC)	43
UK R&B Albums (OCC)	7
