= Stranger in My House (Tamia song) =

Single by Tamia

from the album A Nu Day
- B-side: "Uh'n... to You"
- Released: October 9, 2000
- Genre: R&B
- Length: 4:47
- Label: Elektra
- Songwriters: Shep Crawford; Shae Jones
- Producer: Shep Crawford

Tamia singles chronology
"Can't Go for That" (2000)	"Stranger in My House" (2000)	"Tell Me Who" (2001)

"Stranger in My House" is a song recorded by Canadian singer Tamia. It was written by Shae Jones and frequent collaborator Shep Crawford and produced by the latter. Initially helmed for fellow R&B singer Toni Braxton, it was left unused and later recorded by Tamia for her second studio album, A Nu Day (2000). Inspired by the surprise ending of the supernatural thriller film The Sixth Sense (1999), the strings-led, dramatic R&B ballad is about a woman who is confused with her partner's recent change in behavior and goes into denial about it.

The song was first released to urban adult contemporary radio on October 9, 2000, then later added to other radio stations on October 24, 2000, as the album's second single and was released on January 30, 2001, to Rhythmic contemporary radio and was lastly added to Contemporary hit radio on February 27, 2001. Upon its release, it received a positive reception from music critics who complimented the singer for her vocal performance, and reached number 10 on the US Billboard Hot 100, becoming Tamia's first top ten hit on the chart. "Stranger in My House" also peaked at number three on Billboard's Hot R&B/Hip-Hop Songs, while reaching the top spot on the Dance Club Songs chart. An accompanying music video, directed by Paul Hunter, features Tamia performing in an indoor pool.

== Background ==
"Stranger in My House" was written by singer Shae Jones and producer Shep Crawford. Initially penned with fellow R&B singer Toni Braxton in mind, it was conceived after a writer’s block during which Crawford failed to come up with a song for Braxton. He was eventually inspired to resume work after watching the supernatural psychological thriller film The Sixth Sense (1999) and its surprise ending which encouraged him to write a song "that has a twist," leading to the lyrics "could it be that the stranger is me / Have I changed so drastically / And you remained the same." However, when the ballad was offered to Braxton for recording, her record company LaFace Records rejected it.

Left unused, "Stranger in My House" was one out of several records Crawford played for Tamia when Elektra Records consulted him to work with her on her second album A Nu Day (2000). The singer reportedly "loved" the record. However, it was not until after a meeting with Elektra head Sylvia Rhone that "Stranger in My House" was bought for Tamia to record. Tracking of the song took place at both the Paramount Studios in Hollywood and The Enterprise Studios in Burbank, and was overseen by Anne Catalino, and Jamie Seyberth. Jimmy "Professa" Russell played the guitar, while backing vocals were provided by Jones. Mixing was handled by Kevin Davis. In 2017, Tamia cited "Stranger in My House" as one of her favorite songs within her discography, telling: "‘Stranger in My House’ was a long time ago, but I love performing that song [...] I can’t wait to get to it in a show. So that’s what I compare [any new material] to."

== Release and reception ==
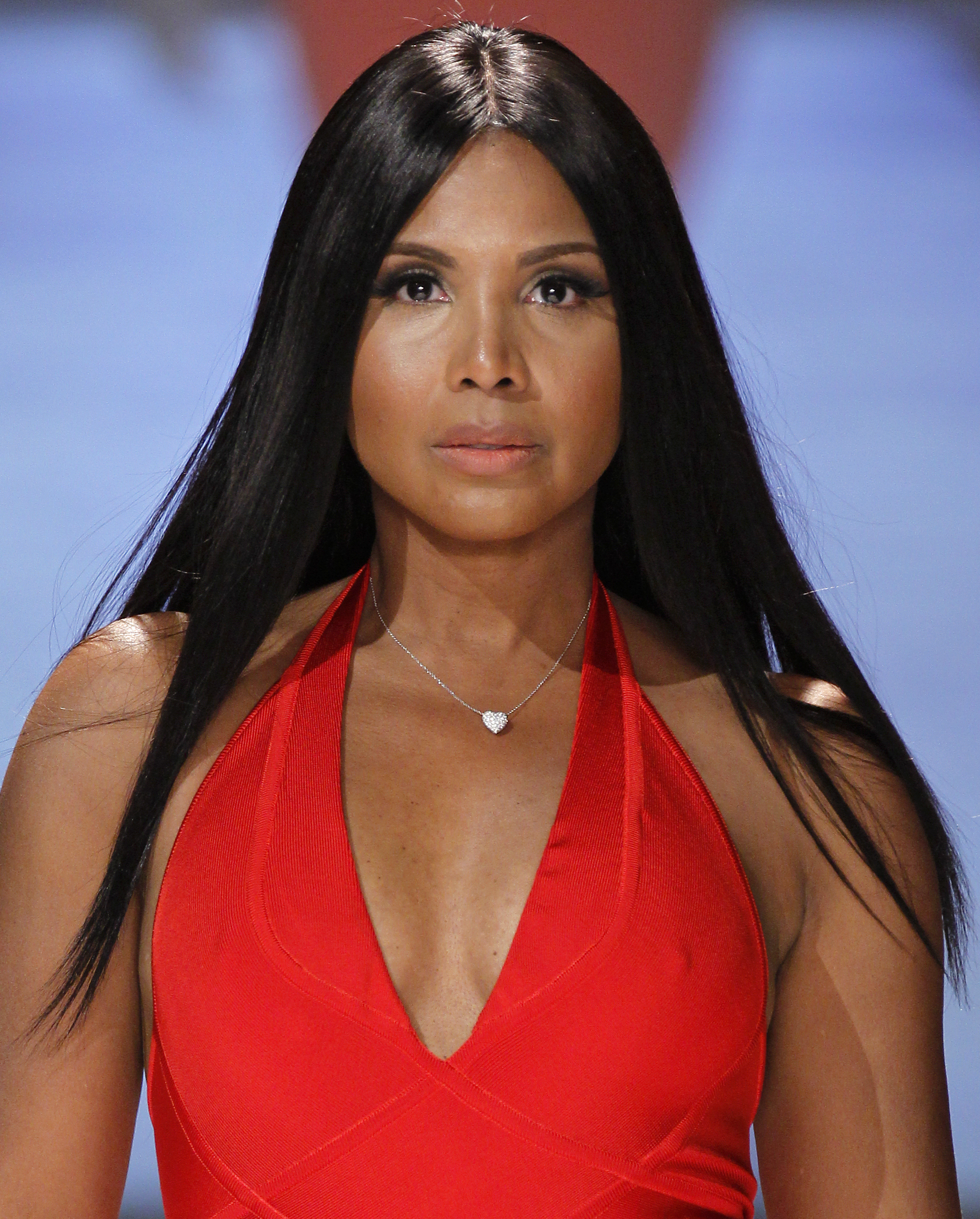
Critics compared the song to the material of Toni Braxton (pictured) for whom the song was initially written.

"Stranger in My House" received favorable reviews from music critics. In his review for parent album A Nu Day, Chuck Taylor from Billboard called the song "gut-wrenching" and "a surefire crossover hit and should be the album's second (or third) single." The song debuted on the US Billboard Hot 100 at number 79 for the chart dated January 13, 2001. Over the course of its first thirteen weeks on the chart, during which it was charting based solely on airplay and sales of its vinyl 12-inch single, the song had reached an initial peak of number 38. Following its retail release in the more popular CD single format, it jumped from number 53 to its peak of number 10 for the chart dated April 14, 2001, having sold 48,500 copies that week. It also jumped from number 19 to its peak of number 3 on the Hot R&B/Hip-Hop Singles & Tracks chart the same week, having previously reached as high as number 9. "Stranger in My House" was also a success in dance clubs, topping the Billboard Hot Dance Club Play chart for the issue dated March 3, 2001.

== Music video ==
The music video for "Stranger in My House" was filmed by Paul Hunter. The visuals of ‘’Stranger in My House” unfold within a sophisticated, oriental-themed home, centering on an indoor pool and accented by sauna, veranda, and garden scenes styled to enhance the song’s emotional weight and sensual mood. It marked his third collaboration with Tamia following their work on "Make Tonight Beautiful" and "Imagination."

== Track listings ==
US CD single
No.	Title	Writer(s)	Producer(s)	Length
1.	"Stranger in My House" (Album Version)	Shep Crawford; Shae Jones	Crawford	4:48
2.	"Uh'n... to You" (Album Version)	Kisa; Harry W. Casey; Richard Finch; Rick James; Keith Murray; Erick Sermon	Crawford	4:13

US CD maxi single
No.	Title	Writer(s)	Producer(s)	Length
1.	"Stranger in My House" (Album Version)	Crawford; Jones	Crawford	4:48
2.	"Stranger in My House" (Thunderpuss Club Mix)	Crawford; Jones	Crawford; Thunderpuss^{[A]}	10:33
3.	"Stranger in My House" (HQ2 Radio Mix)	Crawford; Jones	Crawford; Hex Hector^{[A]}; Mac Quayle^{[A]}	4:20
4.	"Stranger in My House" (Maurice's Club Radio Mix)	Crawford; Jones	Crawford; Maurice Joshua^{[A]}	3:55
5.	"Stranger in My House" (So So Def Remix)	Crawford; Jones	Crawford; Jermaine Dupri^{[A]}; Bryan Michael Cox^{[B]}	4:57
6.	"Stranger in My House" (Thunderpuss Radio Mix)	Crawford; Jones	Crawford; Thunderpuss^{[A]}	3:57
7.	"Stranger in My House" (HQ2 Club Mix)	Crawford; Jones	Crawford; Hector^{[A]}; Quayle^{[A]}	8:09
8.	"Stranger in My House" (Maurice's Club Anthem)	Crawford; Jones	Crawford; Joshua^{[A]}	6:37
9.	"Stranger in My House" (HQ2 Club Mix Acapella)	Crawford; Jones	Crawford; Hector^{[A]}; Quayle^{[A]}	5:00

Notes

- ^{^[A]} denotes co-producer
- ^{^[B]} denotes additional producer

Sample credits

- "Stranger in My House (So So Def Remix)" contains a sample of "The Bridge" performed by MC Shan.

== Personnel ==
Personnel are adapted from the liner notes of A Nu Day.

- Backing vocals – Shae V. Jones
- Drum programming, keyboards, producer – Anthony "Shep" Crawford
- Guitar – Professa
- Mixing – Kevin Davis
- Recording – Anne Catalino
- Tracking – Anne Catalino, Jamie Seyberth

== Charts ==
=== Weekly charts ===
Weekly chart performance for "Stranger in My House"
Chart (2001)	Peak position
Canada (Nielsen SoundScan)	30
UK Singles (OCC)	128
UK Hip Hop/R&B (OCC)	29
US Billboard Hot 100	10
US Dance Club Play (Billboard)	1
US Hot R&B/Hip-Hop Singles & Tracks (Billboard)	3
US Maxi-Singles Sales (Billboard) Remixes	1
US Rhythmic Top 40 (Billboard)	22

=== Year-end charts ===
Year-end chart performance for "Stranger in My House"
Chart (2001)	Position
Canada (Nielsen SoundScan)	148
US Billboard Hot 100	62
US Dance Club Play (Billboard)	44
US Hot R&B/Hip-Hop Singles & Tracks (Billboard)	14
US Maxi-Singles Sales (Billboard)	10
US Rhythmic Top 40 (Billboard)	86

== Release history ==
Release dates and formats for "Stranger in My House"
Region	Date	Format(s)	Label	Ref.
United States	October 9, 2000	Urban adult contemporary radio	Elektra	
United States	October 24, 2000	Urban contemporary radio	Elektra	
United States	January 30, 2001	Rhythmic contemporary radio	Elektra	
United States	February 27, 2001	Contemporary hit radio	Elektra	
