= OurResearch =

Nonprofit organization

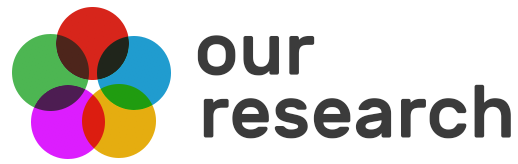
- Logo of OurResearch
- Formation: 2011; 15 years ago
- Founder: Jason Priem; Heather Piwowar
- Type: Nonprofit Organization
- Tax ID no.: 46-1599252
- Legal status: 501(c)(3) organization
- Headquarters: Sanford, North Carolina, US
- Location: Vancouver, Canada
- Services: Unpaywall, Unsub, OpenAlex, ImpactStory, Depsy
- Website: ourresearch.org
- Formerly called: ImpactStory

OurResearch, formerly known as ImpactStory, is a nonprofit organization that creates and distributes tools and services for libraries, institutions and researchers. The organization follows open practices with their data (to the extent allowed by providers' terms of service), code, and governance. OurResearch is funded by the Alfred P. Sloan Foundation, the National Science Foundation, and the Arcadia Fund.

== Services ==
=== ImpactStory ===
ImpactStory is the first open source, web-based tool released by OurResearch. It provides altmetrics to help researchers measure the impacts of their research outputs including journal articles, blog posts, datasets, and software. This aims to change the focus of the scholarly reward system to value and encourage web-native scholarship.

It provides context to its metrics so that they are meaningful without knowledge of the specific dataset: for example, instead of letting the reader guess whether having five forks on GitHub is common, ImpactStory would tell that the repository is in the 95th percentile of all GitHub repositories created that year.

The metrics provided by ImpactStory can be used by researchers who want to know how many times their work has been downloaded and shared, and also research funders who are interested in the impact of research beyond only considering citations to journal articles.

=== Unpaywall ===
Unpaywall, begun as an interface for oaDOI.org, is a browser extension which finds legal free versions of (paywalled) scholarly articles. In July 2018, Unpaywall was reported to provide free access to 20 million articles, which accounts for about 47% of the articles that people search for with Unpaywall. As of 2024, Unpaywall claims to provide access to 49 million free articles. It further states that "Unpaywall users read 52% of research papers for free". In June 2017, it was integrated into Web of Science, and in July 2018, Elsevier announced plans the same month to integrate the service into the Scopus search engine.

=== GetTheResearch.org ===
In 2019, GetTheResearch.org was announced as a search engine for open access content found by Unpaywall, with machine learning features to facilitate discoverability.

=== Unsub ===
Unsub, previously Unpaywall Journals, was launched in 2019 as a data analysis tool for libraries to estimate the actual cost and value of their subscriptions.

The tool reduces information asymmetry in negotiations over subscriptions with publishers: in its paid tailored version, it allows to merge Unpaywall data about open access status and expected evolution in 5 years, article processing charges, usage statistics and the libraries' own parameters (such as the cost of interlibrary loans) to calculate various indicators including the cost effectiveness or net cost per use of a current or planned subscription (or lack thereof).

Unpaywall Journals was used in 2020 by the SUNY Libraries Consortium to assist in the cancellation of their big deal with Elsevier, which was replaced by a subscription to 248 titles, allowing expected savings of 50–70% over the baseline, or 5 to 7 million dollars per year.

=== OpenAlex ===
Demo of the OpenAlex user interface as of March 2024

OpenAlex is an open catalog of scholarly papers, authors, institutions, and more. OpenAlex launched in January 2022 with a free API and data snapshot. The purpose of OpenAlex is to catalog publication sources, author information, and research topics. It also shows connections between these data points to provide a comprehensive, interlinked view of the global research system. It is considered an alternative to the Microsoft Academic Graph, which retired on 31 December 2021.

OpenAlex contains extensive metadata across scientific works, authors, publication venues, institutions, and concepts. Specifically, it includes metadata for 209 million works such as journal articles and books; 13 million authors with disambiguated identities; metadata for 124,000 venues that host works, including journals and online repositories; metadata for 109,000 institutions; and 65,000 concepts from Wikidata, which are algorithmically linked to works using an automated hierarchical multi-tag classifier.

== See also ==
- 12ft
- Bypass Paywalls Clean
- #ICanHazPDF
- Library Genesis
- Open Access Button
- Sci-Hub
