= Make It Hot (Nicole Wray song) =

Single by Nicole featuring Missy Elliott and Mocha

from the album Make It Hot
- Released: June 2, 1998
- Recorded: 1997
- Studio: Manhattan Center Studios, New York
- Genre: R&B; hip-hop soul
- Length: 4:27
- Label: Elektra; The Goldmind Inc.
- Songwriters: Melissa Elliott; Aleesha Richards; Timothy Mosley
- Producer: Timbaland

Nicole singles chronology
"Make It Hot" (1998)	"I Can't See" (1998)

Missy Elliott singles chronology
"Hit Em wit da Hee" (1998)	"Make It Hot" (1998)	"5 Minutes" (1998)

Mocha singles chronology
"Hit Em wit da Hee" (1998)	"Make It Hot" (1998)	"I Can't See" (1998)

"Make It Hot" is the lead single from Nicole's debut album Make It Hot. The single was released on June 2, 1998, written by Missy "Misdemeanor" Elliott, Tim Mosley, and Aleesha Richards, and produced by Timbaland. The song features Aleesha "Mocha" Richards and Elliott and uncredited vocals from Keli Nicole Price.

== Music video ==
The official music video for the song was directed by Christopher Erskin. It takes place in a movie theater. It starts with Missy Elliott's voice coming first, then leads into Mocha's rap verse with Nicole standing beside her. Later, in another room, Nicole and her dancers are dancing to the music while Nicole is singing. Cameo appearances are made by Aaliyah, Keli Nicole Price, Ginuwine, Timbaland and Magoo. The video finishes with them singing the rest of the song and Nicole's dancers.

== Chart performance ==
"Make It Hot" reached number 5 on the Billboard Hot 100, number 2 on the Hot R&B/Hip-Hop Singles and Tracks, number 5 on the Top 40 Mainstream, number 6 on the Rhythmic Top 40, and number 40 on the Top 40 Tracks. The song also hit number 22 on the UK charts.

=== Weekly charts ===
Chart (1998)	Peak position
UK Singles (OCC)	22
US Billboard Hot 100	5
US Billboard Hot R&B/Hip-Hop Songs	2

=== Year-end charts ===
Chart (1998)	Position
US Billboard Hot 100	41

=== Certifications ===
Region	Certification	Certified units/sales
United States (RIAA)	Gold	700,000

== Track listing ==
1. Radio Version (featuring Missy "Misdemeanor" Elliott & Mocha) - 4:05
2. Instrumental - 4:28
3. Acapella (featuring Missy "Misdemeanor" Elliott & Mocha) - 3:48
