= Malcolm CasSelle =

American businessman (1970–2020)

- Born: March 22, 1970
- Died: November 17, 2020 (aged 50)
- Education: MIT, Stanford University
- Occupation: Businessman

Malcolm CasSelle (1970-2020) was an American businessman. He was CEO of BIGtoken, Inc. He was the CIO of OPSkins and was the President of WAX (Worldwide Asset eXchange). Prior to WAX, CasSelle was CTO and president of New Ventures at Tribune Publishing. Prior to Tribune Publishing, he was senior vice president and general manager, Digital Media of SeaChange International, which he joined as part of the company's acquisition of Timeline Labs, where he was CEO. Previously, CasSelle led startups in the digital industry, including MediaPass, Xfire and Groupon's joint venture with Tencent in China.

CasSelle has also been an active early stage investor in companies including Facebook, Zynga, and most recently Bitcoin-related companies.

== Personal life ==
Malcolm CasSelle was engaged to Carolyn Land of Los Angeles, CA in Nov 2019.

Malcolm died in Mexico on November 17, 2020.

== Education ==
CasSelle held a bachelor's degree from MIT and a master's degree from Stanford University, both in computer science. He was a member of the Theta Xi fraternity. He spoke Japanese and Mandarin.

== Career ==
In 1995, CasSelle co-founded and was the CTO of NetNoir, one of the first media production websites focused on Afrocentric culture. The company was the first outside company to be accepted into the AOL Greenhouse Program. From 1998 to 2002 he was a senior vice president and advisor to the CEO at Pacific Century CyberWorks (PCCW), a publicly traded telco service provider based in Hong Kong where he developed the first commercially viable interactive television systems for global distribution.

He was a director of Hong Kong-based Capital Union Investments from 2006 to 2013 where he managed private direct investments into late-stage internet companies. He was also a senior executive at Groupon’s joint venture with Chinese instant messaging and gaming giant Tencent.

In April 2012, he was named CEO of the global social network for core video game players, Xfire. Since January 2013, he was CEO of MediaPass, an online paywall solution designed to generate subscription-based revenues for digital content. That same year, CasSelle co-founded Timeline Labs a social media tracking software company where he was CEO. In December 2014, the company was acquired by SeaChange International. Following the acquisition, CasSelle was Senior Vice President and General Manager, Digital Media of SeaChange International.

In February 2016, CasSelle was named CTO and President of New Ventures at Tribune Publishing. CasSelle was the President of Worldwide Asset eXchange and CIO of OPSkins until 2020 and was instrumental in their strategy, fund raising and whitepaper. CasSelle was CEO of BIGtoken, a publicly traded company that pays users for the value of their data.
