= Paywall =

Method of restricting access to content

Mock-up of a "hard" paywall on a fictional news website

A paywall is a method of restricting access to content, with a purchase or a paid subscription, especially news. Beginning in the mid-2010s, newspapers started implementing paywalls on their websites as a way to increase revenue after years of decline in paid print readership and advertising revenue, partly due to the use of ad blockers. In academics, research papers are often subject to a paywall and are available via academic libraries that subscribe.

Paywalls have also been used as a way of increasing the number of print subscribers; for example, some newspapers offer access to online content plus delivery of a Sunday print edition at a lower price than online access alone. Newspaper websites such as that of The Boston Globe and The New York Times use this tactic because it increases both their online revenue and their print circulation (which in turn provides more ad revenue).

== History ==
In 1996, The Wall Street Journal set up and has continued to maintain a "hard" paywall. It continued to be widely read, acquiring over one million users by mid-2007, and 15 million visitors in March 2008.

In 2010, following in the footsteps of The Wall Street Journal, The Times (London) implemented a "hard" paywall; a decision which was controversial because, unlike The Wall Street Journal, The Times is a general news site, and it was said that rather than paying, users would seek the information without charge elsewhere. The paywall was deemed in practice to be neither a success nor a failure, having recruited 105,000 paying visitors. In contrast The Guardian resisted the use of a paywall, citing "a belief in an open Internet" and "care in the community" as its reasoning – an explanation found in its welcome article to online news readers who, blocked from The Times site following the implementation of their paywall, came to The Guardian for online news. The Guardian since experimented with other revenue-increasing ventures such as open API. Other papers, prominently The New York Times, have oscillated between the implementation and removal of various paywalls. Because online news remains a relatively new medium, it has been suggested that experimentation is key to maintaining revenue while keeping online news consumers satisfied.

Some implementations of paywalls proved unsuccessful, and have been removed. Experts who are skeptical of the paywall model include Arianna Huffington, who declared "the paywall is history" in a 2009 article in The Guardian. In 2010, Wikipedia co-founder Jimmy Wales reportedly called The Times's paywall "a foolish experiment." One major concern was that, with content so widely available, potential subscribers would turn to free sources for their news. The adverse effects of earlier implementations included decline in traffic and poor search engine optimization.

Paywalls have become controversial, with partisans arguing over the effectiveness of paywalls in generating revenue and their effect on media in general. Critics of paywalls include many businesspeople, academics such as media professor Jay Rosen, and journalists such as Howard Owens and media analyst Matthew Ingram of GigaOm. Those who see potential in paywalls include investor Warren Buffett, former Wall Street Journal publisher Gordon Crovitz, and media mogul Rupert Murdoch. Some have changed their opinions of paywalls. Felix Salmon of Reuters was initially an outspoken skeptic of paywalls, but later expressed the opinion that they could be effective. A NYU media theorist, Clay Shirky, was initially a skeptic of paywalls, but in May 2012 wrote, "[Newspapers] should turn to their most loyal readers for income, via a digital subscription service of the sort the [New York Times] has implemented."

== Types ==
Three high level models of paywall have emerged: hard paywalls that allow no free content and prompt the user straight away to pay in order to read, listen or watch the content, soft paywalls that allow some free content, such as an abstract or summary, and metered paywalls that allow a set number of free articles that a reader can access over a specific period of time, allowing more flexibility in what users can view without subscribing.

=== "Hard" paywalls ===
The "hard" paywall, as used by The Times, requires paid subscription before any of their online content can be accessed. A paywall of this design is considered the riskiest option for the content provider. It is estimated that a website will lose 90% of its online audience and ad revenue only to gain it back through its ability to produce online content appealing enough to attract subscribers. News sites with "hard" paywalls can succeed if they:

- Provide added value to their content
- Target a niche audience
- Already dominate their own market

Many experts denounce the "hard" paywall because of its inflexibility, believing it acts as a major deterrent for users. Financial blogger Felix Salmon wrote that when one encounters a "paywall and can't get past it, you simply go away and feel disappointed in your experience." Jimmy Wales, founder of the online encyclopedia Wikipedia, argued that the use of a "hard" paywall diminishes a site's influence. Wales stated that, by implementing a "hard" paywall, The Times "made itself irrelevant." Though the Times had potentially increased its revenue, it decreased its traffic by 60%.

=== "Soft" paywalls ===
In this fictional example, a banner across the bottom of the page tells the user that they can read seven more articles for free before they need to subscribe.

The "soft" paywall is best embodied by the metered model. The metered paywall allows users to view a specific number of articles before requiring a paid subscription. In contrast to sites allowing access to select content outside the paywall, the metered paywall allows access to any article as long as the user has not surpassed the set limit. The Financial Times allows users to access 10 articles before becoming paid subscribers. The New York Times controversially implemented a metered paywall in March 2011 which let users view 20 free articles a month before requiring a paid subscription. In April 2012, it reduced the number of free articles per month to 10. Their metered paywall has been defined as not only soft, but "porous", because it also allows access to any link posted on a social media site, and up to 25 free articles a day if accessed through a search engine.

The model is designed to allow the paper to "retain traffic from light users", which in turn allows the paper to keep their number of visitors high, while receiving circulation revenue from the site's heavy users. Using this model The New York Times garnered 224,000 subscribers in the first three months. While many proclaimed their paywall a success after it reported a profit in the third quarter of 2011, Anne Nelson of MediaShift called the profit increase "ephemeral" and "largely based on a combination of cutbacks and the sale of assets."

Google Search previously enforced a policy known as "First Click Free", whereby paywalled news websites were required to have a metered paywall for a minimum number of articles per-day (three, initially five) that could be accessed via results on Google Search or Google News. The site could still paywall other articles that were accessible via the page. This encouraged publications to allow their articles to be indexed by Google's web crawler, thus enhancing their prominence on Google Search and Google News. Sites that opted out of First Click Free were demoted in Google's rankings. Google discontinued the policy in 2017, stating that it provides additional tools for helping publications integrate subscriptions into its platforms.

=== Combination ===
The "freemium" paywall strategy is a softer type of paywall that provides free access to basic content, but requires payments for premium content. Such a strategy has been said to lead to "the creation of two categories: cheap fodder available for free (often created by junior staffers), and more 'noble' content." This type of separation brings into question the egalitarianism of the online news medium. According to political and media theorist Robert A. Hackett, "the commercial press of the 1800s, the modern world's first mass medium, was born with a profound democratic promise: to present information without fear or favour, to make it accessible to everyone, and to foster public rationality based on equal access to relevant facts.".

The Boston Globe implemented a version of this strategy in September 2011 by launching a second website, BostonGlobe.com, to solely offer content from the paper behind a hard paywall, aside from most sports content, which was kept open to compete against other local sports websites. The former Boston Globe website, Boston.com, was relaunched with a larger focus on community news, sports, and lifestyle content, as well as selected Boston Globe content. The paper's editor Martin Baron described the two services as "two different sites for two different kinds of reader – some understand [that] journalism needs to be funded and paid for. Other people just won't pay. We have a site for them." By March 2014, the site had over 60,000 digital subscribers; at that time, the Globe announced that it would replace the hard paywall with a metered system allowing users to read 10 articles without charge in any 30-day period. The Boston Globe editor Brian McGrory believed that an ability to sample the site's premium content would encourage more people to subscribe to the service. At the same time, McGrory also announced plans to give Boston.com a more distinct editorial focus, with a "sharper voice that better captures the sensibilities of Boston", while migrating other content by Globe writers, such as blogs from Boston.com to the paper's website, but keeping them freely available.

=== Cookie paywall ===
"Cookie paywalls" are cookie banners that require the user to either pay to access the content, or accept targeted advertising and third-party cookies to access it for free. The compatibility of this technique with data protection laws like the General Data Protection Regulation is controversial, and multiple data protection agencies have established different guidelines. In countries like Italy, Austria, France and Denmark, it is lawful as long as the website provides the user with the option of accessing equivalent content or services without giving their consent to the storage and use of cookies or other tracking tools, and the subscription to the site has a modest and fair cost so that it does not constrain the user’s free choice.

== Reception ==
=== Industry ===
Professional reception to the implementation of paywalls has been mixed. Most discussion of paywalls centers on their success or failure as business ventures, and overlooks their ethical implications for maintaining an informed public. In the paywall debate there are those who see the implementation of a paywall as a "sandbag strategy" – a strategy which may help increase revenue in the short term, but not a strategy that will foster future growth for the newspaper industry. For the "hard" paywall specifically, however, there seems to be an industry consensus that the negative effects (loss of readership) outweigh the potential revenue, unless the newspaper targets a niche audience.

There are also those who remain optimistic about the use of paywalls to help revitalize floundering newspaper revenues. Those who believe implementing paywalls will succeed, however, continually buffer their opinion with contingencies. Bill Mitchell states that for a paywall to bring new revenue and not deter current readers, newspapers must: "invest in flexible systems, exploit their journalists' expertise in niche areas, and, crucially, offer readers their money's worth in terms of new value." The State of the News Media's 2011 annual report on American journalism makes the sweeping claim that: "[t]o survive financially, the consensus on the business side of news operations is that news sites not only need to make their advertising smarter, but they also need to find some way to charge for content and to invent new revenue streams other than display advertising and subscriptions." Even those who do not believe in the general success of paywalls recognize that, for a profitable future, newspapers must start generating more attractive content with added value, or investigate new sources of earning revenue.

Proponents of the paywall believe that it may be crucial for smaller publications to stay afloat. They argue that since 90 percent of advertising revenues are concentrated in the top 50 publishers, smaller operations can not necessarily depend on the traditional ad-supported free content model the way that larger sites can. Many paywall advocates also contend that people are more than willing to pay a small price for quality content. In a March 2013 guest post for VentureBeat, Malcolm CasSelle of MediaPass stated his belief that monetization would become "something of a self-fulfilling prophecy: people [will] pay for content, and that money goes back into making the overall content even better."

In April 2013 the Newspaper Association of America released its industry revenue profile for 2012, which reported that circulation revenue grew by 5 percent for dailies, making it the first year of circulation growth in ten years. Digital-only circulation revenue reportedly grew 275%; print and digital bundled circulation revenue grew 499%. Along with the shift towards bundling print and online into combined access subscriptions, print-only circulation revenue declined 14%. This news corroborates a growing belief that digital subscriptions will be the key to securing the long-term survival of newspapers.

In May 2019, research by the Reuters Institute for the Study of Journalism at the University of Oxford showed that despite the controversies surrounding paywalls, these were on the rise across Europe and the United States. According to the study by Felix Simon and Lucas Graves, more than two-thirds of leading newspapers (69%) across the EU and US were operating some kind of online paywall as of 2019, a trend that has increased since 2017 according to the researchers, with the US seeing an increase from 60% to 76%.

=== Reader ===
General user response to the implementation of paywalls has been measured through a number of recent studies which analyze readers' online news-reading habits. A study completed by the Canadian Media Research Consortium entitled "Canadian Consumers Unwilling to Pay for News Online", directly identifies the Canadian response to paywalls. Surveying 1,700 Canadians, the study found that 92% of participants who read the news online would rather find a free alternative than pay for their preferred site (in comparison to 82% of Americans), while 81% stated that they would absolutely not pay for their preferred online news site. Based on the poor reception of paid content by the participants, the study concludes with a statement similar to those of the media experts, stating, with the exception of prominent papers such as The Wall Street Journal and The Times, that given the "current public attitudes, most publishers had better start looking elsewhere for revenue solutions."

A study by Elizabeth Benítez from the World Association of News Publishers surveyed 355 participants in Mexico, Europe and the United States. The study found that "Young readers are willing to pay up to €6 for a monthly digital news subscription – 50% less than the average price (€14.09) across countries. According to the Reuters Institute for the Study of Journalism (Simon and Graves 2019), €14.09 is the average monthly subscription price across six European countries and the United States."

Research based on readers' behaviour at 21 German and Austrian news websites investigated which paywall strategies were associated with readers starting and finished the process of taking out a subscription. The study found that on paywalled articles that displayed a standfirst ("deck" in US-English) or introductory paragraph, the likelihood of visitors clicking on the “subscribe now” button was significantly reduced. The researchers also found that offering a discount significantly increased the odds of people paying for subscription. Other subscription offers—offering an ePaper, base subscription price, length and cost of trails, and offering smart devices or small gifts—were mostly not associated with the decision to subscribe.

== Ethical implications ==
=== Deterioration of the online public sphere ===
Hackett argues that a "forum on the internet [...] can function as a specialized or smaller-scale public sphere." In the past, the internet has been an ideal location for the general public to gather and discuss relevant news issues – an activity made accessible first through free access to online news content, and subsequently the ability to comment on the content, creating a forum. Erecting a paywall restricts the public's open communication with one another by restricting the ability to both read and share online news.

The obvious way in which a paywall restricts equal access to the online public sphere is through requiring payment, deterring those who do not want to pay, and barring those who cannot from joining the online discussion. The restriction of equal access was taken to a new extreme when the UK's The Independent in October 2011 placed a paywall on foreign readers only. Online news media have the proven ability to create global connection beyond the typical reach of a public sphere. In Democratizing Global Media, Hackett and global communications theorist Yuezhi Zhao describe how a new "wave of media democratization arises in the era of the internet which has facilitated transnational civil society networks of and for democratic communication."

The use of paywalls has also received many complaints from online news readers regarding an online subscriptions' inability to be shared like a traditional printed paper. While a printed paper can be shared among friends and family, the ethics behind sharing an online subscription are less clear because there is no physical object involved. The New York Times' "ethicist" columnist, Ariel Kaminer, addressing the question of sharing online subscription, states that "sharing with your spouse or young child is one thing; sharing with friends or family who live elsewhere is another." The reader comments following Kaminer's response focus on the dichotomy between paying for a printed paper and paying for an online subscription. A printed paper's ease of access meant that more individuals could read a single copy, and that everyone who read the paper had the ability to send a letter to the editor without the hassle of registering or paying for the subscription. As such, the use of a paywall closes off the communication in both the personal realm and online. This opinion is not just held by online news readers, but also by opinion writers. Jimmy Wales comments that he "would rather write [an opinion piece] where it is going to be read", declaring that "putting opinion pieces behind paywalls [makes] no sense."

In the U.S., it has been observed that the use of paywalls by high-quality publications has enhanced the reach of non-paywalled online outlets that promote right-wing perspectives, conspiracy theories, and fake news.

=== Paying to stay informed ===
The use of a paywall to bar individuals from accessing news content online without payment, brings up numerous ethical questions. According to Hackett, media are already "failing to furnish citizens with ready access to relevant civic information." The implementation of paywalls on previously free news content heightens this failure through intentional withholding. Hackett cites "general cultural and economic mechanisms, such as the commodification of information and the dependence of commercial media on advertising revenue" as two of the greatest influences on media performance. According to Hackett, these cultural and economic mechanisms "generate violations of the democratic norm of equality." Implementation of a paywall addresses and intimately ties the two mechanisms cited by Hackett, as the paywall commodifies news content to bring in revenue from both readers and from increased circulation of printed paper's ads. The result of these mechanisms, as stated by Hackett, is an impediment to "equal access to relevant [news] facts."

The commodification of information–making news into a product that must be purchased–restricts the egalitarian founding principle of the newspaper. Editor's Weblog reporter Katherine Travers, addressing this issue in a post discussing the future of The Washington Post, asks, "is digital subscription as permissible as charging a couple of dollars now and then for a paper copy?" While subscription fees have long been attached to print newspapers, all other forms of news have traditionally been free. Online news, in comparison has existed as a medium of free dissemination. Poynter digital media fellow Jeff Sonderman outlines the ethical tension created by a paywall. Sonderman explains that "[t]he underlying tension is that newspapers act simultaneously as businesses and as servants of the public’s interest. As for-profit enterprises, they have the right (the duty, even) to make money for shareholders or private owners. But most also claim to have a social compact, in which they safeguard the entire public interest and help their entire community shape and understand its shared values."

== Counter strategies ==
=== Newspapers disabling the paywall ===
Some newspapers have removed their paywall from blocking content covering emergencies. When Hurricane Irene hit the East Coast of the United States in late August 2011, The New York Times declared that all storm related coverage, accessed both online and through mobile devices, would be free to readers. The New York Times‌' assistant managing editor, Jeff Roberts, discusses the paper's decision, stating: "[w]e are aware of our obligations to our audience and to the public at large when there is a big story that directly impacts such a large portion of people." In his article discussing the removal of paywalls, Sonderman commends The New York Times' action, stating that, while a publisher "commits to a paywall as the best business strategy for his news company, there may be some stories or subjects which carry such importance and urgency that it is irresponsible to withhold them from nonsubscribers."

Similarly in 2020, a large number of outlets exempted stories relating to the COVID-19 pandemic from their paywalls as a public service, and to combat misinformation relating to the virus. In April 2020, Canadian newspaper group Postmedia went further and temporarily removed its paywall from all content in April 2020, with a sponsorship from a fast food chain.

=== New revenue initiatives ===
Given the overwhelming opinion that, regardless of paywall success, new revenue sources must be sought out for newspapers' financial success, it is important to highlight new business initiatives. According to Poynter media expert Bill Mitchell, in order for a paywall to generate sustainable revenue, newspapers must create "new value"—higher quality, innovation, etc.—in their online content that merits payment which previously free content did not. In addition to erecting paywalls, newspapers have been increasingly exploiting tablet and mobile news products, the profitability of which remains inconclusive. Another strategy, pioneered by The New York Times, involves creating new revenue by packaging old content in e-books and special feature offerings, to create an appealing product for readers. The draw of these packages is not just the topic but the authors and the breadth of coverage. According to reporter Mathew Ingram, newspapers can benefit from these special offerings in two ways, first by taking advantage of old content when new interest arises, such as an anniversary or an important event, and second, through the creation of packages of general interest. The New York Times, for example, has created packages, mainly ebooks, on baseball, golf and the digital revolution.

Also, successful implementation of paywalls in digital media follows a rule of thumb: where there is a drop in advertising revenue, there is a solid chance for adopting a subscription model and/or paywalls.

=== Alternative revenue initiative: API ===
An open API (application programming interface) makes the online news site "a platform for data and information that [the newspaper company] can generate value from in other ways." Opening their API makes a newspaper's data available to outside sources, allowing developers and other services to make use of a paper's content for a fee. The Guardian, in keeping with its "belief in an open internet", has been experimenting with the use of API. The Guardian has created an "open platform" which works on a three level system:

1. Base/Free – The Guardian's content is free to anyone for personal and non-commercial uses
2. Commercial – Commercial licenses are available for developers to use the API content if they agree to keep the associated advertising
3. "Bespoke" Arrangement – Developers can partner with the newspaper, using specific data to create a service or an app, the revenue from which will be shared

While an open API is regarded as a gamble just like a paywall, journalist Matthew Ingram ethically notes that the use of an open API aims at "profiting from the open exchange of information and other aspects of an online-media world, while the [paywall] is an attempt to create the kind of artificial information scarcity that newspapers used to enjoy." An open API keeps news content free to the public while the newspaper makes a profit from the quality and usefulness of its data to other businesses. The open API strategy can be commended because it takes the pressure off of the news room to continually investigate and explore new means of revenue. Instead, the open API strategy relies on the interest and ideas of those outside the newsroom, to whom the site's content and data are attractive.

=== Readers bypassing paywalls ===
Readers are sometimes able to bypass paywalls by changing their browser settings (e.g. disabling JavaScript to bypass a paywall that requires it) or using third-party tools like Bypass Paywalls Clean. Data on the number of readers who bypass paywalls is often unclear to publishers due to the variety of options employed to circumvent paywalls, and responses from publishers have been mixed. In 2023, the Financial Times expressed a lack of concern over paywall circumvention, finding that only a small portion of its readers bypass its paywalls, while the Boston Globe saw its subscriber count triple after closing its paywall loopholes in 2019.

In November 2018, Mozilla removed Bypass Paywalls, a paywall-bypassing browser extension, from the Firefox add-on store for violating its terms of service. The browser extension Bypass Paywalls Clean was also removed from the Firefox add-on store in 2023, as well as the GitLab and GitHub software hosting services in 2024.

==== Legal implications of bypassing paywalls ====
It remains unclear whether bypassing digital paywalls, with or without the use of third-party tools, violates DMCA anti-circumvention provision. In New York University Law Review, Theresa M. Troupson compares differing interpretations in Chamberlain v. Skylink and MDY Industries v. Blizzard Entertainment for the purpose. In the first, Federal Circuit court held that circumventing an access protection measure violates the DMCA only if the act is reasonably related to an infringement, such as making or distributing copies of an article without a license. In the latter, the Ninth Circuit court held that the act of circumvention itself, is prohibited under DMCA irrespective of whether it results in copyright infringement.

== Abandoned paywall initiatives ==
The New York Times — TimesSelect
The original online-subscription program, TimesSelect, was implemented in 2005 in an effort to create a new revenue stream. TimesSelect charged $49.95 a year, or $7.95 a month, for online access to the newspaper's archives. In 2007, paid subscriptions were earning $10 million, but growth projections were low compared to the growth of online advertising. In 2007, The New York Times dropped the paywall to its post-1980 archive. Pre-1980 articles in PDF are still behind the paywall, but an abstract of most articles is available for free.

The Atlantic
Originally online content was available only to print subscribers. This changed in 2008 under the supervision of James Bennet, editor-in-chief, in an effort to rebrand the magazine into a multi-platform business. The Atlantic reintroduced a soft paywall on 5 September 2019 which allows readers to view five free articles each month, requiring a subscription to view articles after that.

Johnston Press
In November 2009, the UK regional publisher of over 300 titles erected paywalls on six local newspapers' websites, including Carrick Gazette and the Whitby Gazette. The model was dropped in March 2010; paid subscriber growth during the 4-month period was reportedly in the low double-digits.

Ogden Newspapers
Throughout 2014, 2015 and most of 2016, Ogden Newspapers' daily newspapers were placed behind a paywall. The system displayed teaser headlines and the first paragraph of the story. Paid subscribers had access to an e-edition of the newspapers as well as access to the publications via smart phone and tablet apps. Ogden's papers began removing the paywall in November 2016, in conjunction with launching redesigned, mobile and tablet friendly websites.

Quartz
In April 2022, one of the major US business news websites dropped its paywall, which had been in place since 2019. The experiment showed that most of the publication's revenue still comes from advertising, not paid subscribers. All the information on Quartz's website became available for free. The membership option is designed only for those who want to receive exclusive editorial newsletters with analysis and insights on one big news item of the week.

== See also ==
- Attribute-based access control
- Consent or pay
- Content control software
- Digital rights management
- Embargo (academic publishing)
- Freemium
- Information wants to be free
- List of public domain resources behind a paywall
- Open access
- Paysite
- Pay what you want
- Sci-Hub
- TV Everywhere
- Pay to play
