= Make It Hot (album) =

Studio album by Nicole Wray
- Released: August 25, 1998
- Genre: R&B
- Length: 58:30
- Labels: Goldmind; East West; Elektra
- Producers: Missy Elliott (also exec.); Merlin Bobb (co-exec.); Sylvia Rhone (co-exec.); Big Baby; Dent; Kevin Hicks; Donald "Lenny" Holmes; Brian Alexander Morgan; Suga Mike; Timbaland; Gerard "Soundman" Thomas

Nicole Wray chronology
Make It Hot (1998)	Queen Alone (2016)

Make It Hot is the debut studio album by American singer Nicole Wray. The album was released in August 1998 through Missy Elliott's Elektra-distributed vanity label, The Goldmind. The album was produced by Missy Elliott and Timbaland. Some editions of the release credit Nicole as Nicole Ray, a name she only used here and on her single "I Can't See".

== Critical reception ==
Professional ratings
Review scores
Source	Rating
AllMusic	2.5/5 stars
Robert Christgau	(neither)
Entertainment Weekly	B
Rolling Stone	3/5 stars

Michael Gallucci from AllMusic wrote that Make It Hot "is virtually a textbook primer on Elliott's stylistic touch and influence on end-of-the-millennium hip-hop (she raps on, writes songs for, produces, and executive produces Make It Hot – and it's on her custom label). Along with pal Timbaland, Elliott transforms young Nicole's somewhat standard bow into a stuttering slab of post-rap R&B that's as sleekly modern as it is customarily cold." Entertainment Weekly journalist Rob Brunner gave the album a B rating and concluded: "Even if the distinctive Missy-Timbaland sound is getting a little old, Hot proves the formula hasn’t gone cold just yet."

== Chart performance ==
Make It Hot reached number forty-two on the US Billboard 200 and number nineteen on the R&B album chart. The first single, "Make It Hot", reached number five on the Hot 100 chart, number two on the R&B singles chart, and was certified gold. The second single, "I Can't See", reached number thirty-six on the Rhythmic Top 40 chart. In 1999, the third and final single from the album, "Eyes Better Not Wander", reached number seventy-one on the R&B singles chart.

== Track listing ==
No.	Title	Writer(s)	Producer(s)	Length
1.	"The Time Is Now (Intro)" (featuring Missy "Misdemeanor" Elliott)	Missy "Misdemeanor" Elliott	Anthony Dent	1:39
2.	"Seventeen"	Elliott	Elliott; Gerard "Soundman" Thomas; Donald "Lenny" Holmes	4:53
3.	"In da Street" (featuring Mocha & Missy "Misdemeanor" Elliott)	Elliott; Nicole Wray	Elliott; Thomas; Holmes	4:02
4.	"Traffic Jam (Interlude)"		Dent	1:22
5.	"Curiosity" (featuring Lil' Mo & Dent)	Cynthia Loving; Dent	Dent; Kevin Hicks	4:12
6.	"Make It Hot" (featuring Mocha & Missy "Misdemeanor" Elliott)	Elliott; Tim Mosley	Timbaland	4:27
7.	"Prelude (I Can't See)"	Morgan; Loving	Brian Alexander Morgan	0:44
8.	"I Can't See"	Morgan; Loving	Morgan	4:46
9.	"Nervous" (featuring Lil' Mo)	Elliott; Wray	Elliott; Thomas; Holmes	3:34
10.	"Pressure (Interlude)"		Dent; Hicks	1:14
11.	"Boy You Should Listen"	Elliott; Wray	Elliott; Thomas; Holmes	4:47
12.	"Eyes Better Not Wander"	Stephen Garrett; J. Peacock	Smokey	4:33
13.	"Radio DJ (Interlude)"	Darryl McClary; Michael Allen	Big Baby; Suga Mike	1:04
14.	"Silly Love Song"	Loving; McClary; Allen	Big Baby; Suga Mike	4:39
15.	"Raise Your Frown"	Garrett; Peacock; B. Bush	Smokey	4:10
16.	"Borrowed Time"	Loving; McClary; Allen	Big Baby; Suga Mike	5:01
17.	"Testing Our Love (Suga)"	Garrett; Peacock	Smokey	3:36

=== Limited Edition bonus disc ===
1. Clipse - "We Get Money (Got Caught, Pt. 2)"
2. Flipmode Squad - "Everything"
3. Yo Yo - "Do You Wanna Ride?"
4. Missy "Misdemeanor" Elliott - "Get Contact" ^{1}
5. Coko - "He Be Back" ^{1}
6. En Vogue - "No Fool No More"

^{1} Denotes demo version

== Personnel ==
Credits are taken from the album's liner notes.

Instruments and performances

- Davis Barnett – viola
- Larry Gold – cello
- Donald "Lenny" Holmes – bass, guitar
- Emma Kummrow – violin
- Brian Morgan – keyboard
- Nat The Great – beatbox
- Igor Sewic – violin

Technical and production

- Executive producers: Missy "Misdemeanor" Elliott, Merlin Bobb, Sylvia Rhone
- Producers: Big Baby, Merlin Bobb, Missy "Misdemeanor" Elliott, Kevin Hicks, Donald Holmes, Brian Alexander Morgan, Tim Mosley, Sylvia Rhone, Suga Mike, Timbaland
- Vocal producer: Nicole Wray
- Vocal assistance: Missy "Misdemeanor" Elliott
- Engineers: Claude "Swifty" Achille, Jimmy Douglas, Paul Falcone, Nat Foster, Eddie Hudson, Ted Reiger, Jon Smeltz, Stevie Sola
- Assistant engineers: Chuck Bailey, Steve Macauley, Rob Murphy, Jason Rea
- Mixing: Claude "Swifty" Achille, Kevin Davis, Jimmy Douglas, Paul Falcone, Nat Foster, Senator Jimmy D
- Programming: Timbaland
- Mastering: Herb Powers
- Arranger: Missy "Misdemeanor" Elliott, Nat Foster, Larry Gold, Brian Morgan,

== Charts ==
Chart (1998)	Peak position
US Billboard 200	42
US Top R&B/Hip-Hop Albums (Billboard)	19

== Release history ==
List of release dates, showing region and label
Region	Date	Label
Japan	August 20, 1998	The Goldmind; Elektra
United Kingdom	August 24, 1998	The Goldmind; Elektra
United States	August 25, 1998	The Goldmind; Elektra
Germany	September 14, 1998	The Goldmind; Elektra
