= Nicole Wray =

American singer-songwriter

- Also known as: Nicole Ray, Lady Wray
- Born: Nicole Monique Wray; May 2, 1979 (age 47); Salinas, California, U.S.
- Origin: Portsmouth, Virginia, U.S.
- Genres: R&B; soul; blues; pop
- Occupations: Singer; songwriter; music producer
- Years active: 1997–present
- Labels: Big Crown; Truth and Soul; The Goldmind Inc.; Elektra; Roc-A-Fella; Def Jam; Dame Dash Music
- Website: www.ladywray.com

Nicole Monique Wray (born May 2, 1979), also known as Lady Wray, is an American singer-songwriter and music producer.

In June 1998, Wray released her debut single "Make It Hot", which peaked in the top-five on the U.S. Billboard Hot 100. The single became certified gold after six weeks of its release. She released her debut album, Make It Hot on The Goldmind Inc. in August 1998. Following the album's release, Wray appeared on Missy Elliott's song "All N My Grill" in 1999, which earned a gold-status certification by the SNEP. In 2001, Wray departed from The Goldmind Inc. after her original second album Elektric Blue was subjected to several pushback release dates, ultimately becoming shelved.

In 2003, she signed with Roc-A-Fella Records, becoming the first female R&B act to sign to the label. She released a single titled "If I Was Girlfriend" before the label briefly dissolved. Her album Lovechild was scheduled to be released on the Dame Dash Music Group/Def Jam Records in 2005 but was shelved when the label parted with Def Jam. She formed a music duo with Terri Walker called Lady in 2012. The duo released their self-titled debut album in March 2013. The music act became known briefly as Lady, the Band in 2014.

In 2016, Wray adopted the stage name Lady Wray. She released her second album Queen Alone (2016), on Big Crown Records. Her third album, Piece of Me (2022), peaked at number 7 on the UK R&B Albums chart.

== Early life ==
Nicole Monique Wray was born in Salinas, California, to Debra Wray (née Murphy) and Kenneth Wray. Her older brother Kenny Wray is also a singer and she has younger sister Myrtis Wray. At a young age, Wray relocated to Portsmouth, Virginia. She became one of her church's star choir members and also participated in local fashion shows. During her teenage years, Wray was introduced to then-upcoming rapper Missy Elliott, who was looking for a female singer to sign to her own recording label The Goldmind Inc. Wray impressed Elliott by performing SWV's song "Weak" and became the first recording artist on Elliott's label as well as securing a distribution deal with Elektra Records.

== Career ==
=== 1997–2002: Make It Hot and split from The Goldmind Inc./Elektra ===
In 1997, Wray appeared as a featured vocalist on the song "Gettaway" for Missy Elliott's first album Supa Dupa Fly. In June 1998, Wray released her first single "Make It Hot". The single peaked in the top-five on Billboard's Hot 100, and received certified gold-status within six weeks of its release for a total of over 700,000 copies sold.

On August 25, 1998, Wray released her first album Make It Hot. The album achieved moderated success, peaking at number forty-two on Billboard Top 200 Albums and ninety-one on the UK Albums Chart. Following the issue of the album, Wray toured as the opening act and background vocalist for Elliott's concert tour. The album's follow-up singles "I Can't See" and "Eyes Better Not Wander" failed to crossover with the latter only peaking at seventy-one on the Hot R&B/Hip-Hop Songs chart in 1999. In September 1999, Missy Elliott released her single "All n My Grill", which featured Wray, Big Boi, and MC Solaar. The single achieved success in European markets and even garnered a gold-status certification by the SNEP.

In 2000, Wray began recording her original second album titled Elektric Blue. In July 2001, she released the single "I'm Lookin'" which was planned to be the lead single. Following the single's moderate performance on the R&B chart, the album Elektric Blue was subjected to several postponed dates and was ultimately shelved when Wray decided to leave The Goldmind Inc and Elektra Records in 2001. In 2002, gospel duo Pam & Dodi released "Don't Have To", a gospel and pop song written by Wray. The song was featured as the lead single of the duo's self-titled album.

=== 2003–2011: Lovechild ===
In June 2003, Wray released a single "Welcome Home" with rapper Ol' Dirty Bastard. Later that year, Wray secured a recording contract with Roc-A-Fella Records. In November 2004, Wray issued a single "If I Was Your Girlfriend", originally planned to be the lead single of her forthcoming album Lovechild. The single spent twenty weeks on R&B chart but ultimately peaked at fifty-seven. Later that year, Wray experienced a brief roster move from Roc-A Fella to Def Jam Records to ultimately the Dame Dash Music Group.The album Lovechild was scheduled to be released in April 2005 but was shelved after the Dame Dash Music Group became defunct. During her time on the Dame Dash Music Group, Wray made a cameo appearance in movie State Property 2.

In July 2005, Wray and Mike Jones released "Still Tippin' (It's a Man's World) (Remix)" on the soundtrack of American drama film Hustle & Flow. Still maintaining her work relationship with Damon Dash, Wray performed on The Black Keys rock and hip-hop fusion album titled Blakroc, released in November 2009. Wray was then enlisted to add her background vocals on The Black Keys' album, Brothers, which was published in May 2010. In June 2010, Wray released Boss Chick which featured unreleased music from years prior. A single titled "I Like It" was issued from the album. In 2011, Wray and 7 Aurelius released a compilation album Dream Factory Sessions which featured unreleased songs recorded in 2004.

=== 2012–2014: Lady and Truth & Soul Records ===
In 2012, Wray formed a retro-soul duo called Lady with Terri Walker, a singer she met in 2009. Lady became the background vocalists for American soul singer Lee Fields during his Lee Fields and The Expressions Tour in 2012. During the tour, Lady recorded their self-titled album and released it in March 2013 on Truth and Soul Records. The album spawned three singles: "Money", "Get Ready", and "Good Lovin'". Heavily influenced by 1960/70s soul music, the album was a success and allowed the duo headline their own concert tour. During their tour, Walker departed from the music act to pursue her solo career. Wray renamed the music act as "Lady, the Band" and continued on with the addition of two background singers for the conclusion of the tour. After the roster move from Truth and Soul Records to Big Crown Records, Wray adopted the stage name Lady Wray.

=== 2016–present: Queen Alone and subsequent releases ===
In June 2016, Wray released "Do It Again", the lead single of her second album Queen Alone. In July 2016, she released the second single "Guilty", a song inspired by her brother's incarceration. In September 2016, Wray issued her second album Queen Alone on Big Crown Records. The album retained a similar retro-soul sound as her earlier project with Lady. Wray continued to promote the album with the issue of the singles "Smiling" and "Underneath My Feet".

In 2019, Wray released two singles: "Piece of Me" and "Come On In". The following year, she issued another single "Storms". In mid-2021, she released another single "Games People Play". Later that year, she issued two more singles: "Under the Sun" and "Through It All". Her third solo album Piece of Me was released on January 28, 2022. The album peaked at number 7 on the UK R&B Albums chart. Following the release of the album, she headlined her first solo tour called the Piece of Me Tour in mid-2022. In 2023, she co-headlined the Lady Wray & Brainstory EU Tour in Europe.

In June 2025, Wray announced her fourth album Cover Girl to be release on September 26, 2025. The album's lead single, "You're Gonna Win", was released on June 23, 2025. In July 2025, she embarked on her Cover Girl EU/UK Tour. On 2 September 2025, she released the single "Cover Girl".

== Personal life ==
In June 2018, Wray gave birth to her daughter Melody Bacote. In April 2020, Wray married musician Dante Bacote.

== Discography ==
- Make It Hot (1998) (as "Nicole" or "Nicole Wray")
- Queen Alone (2016) (as "Lady Wray")
- Piece of Me (2022) (as "Lady Wray")
- Cover Girl (2025) (as "Lady Wray")

== Filmography ==
Films

- State Property 2 (2005)

Television

- The Wayans Bros. (1998)
