= Blu Cantrell discography =

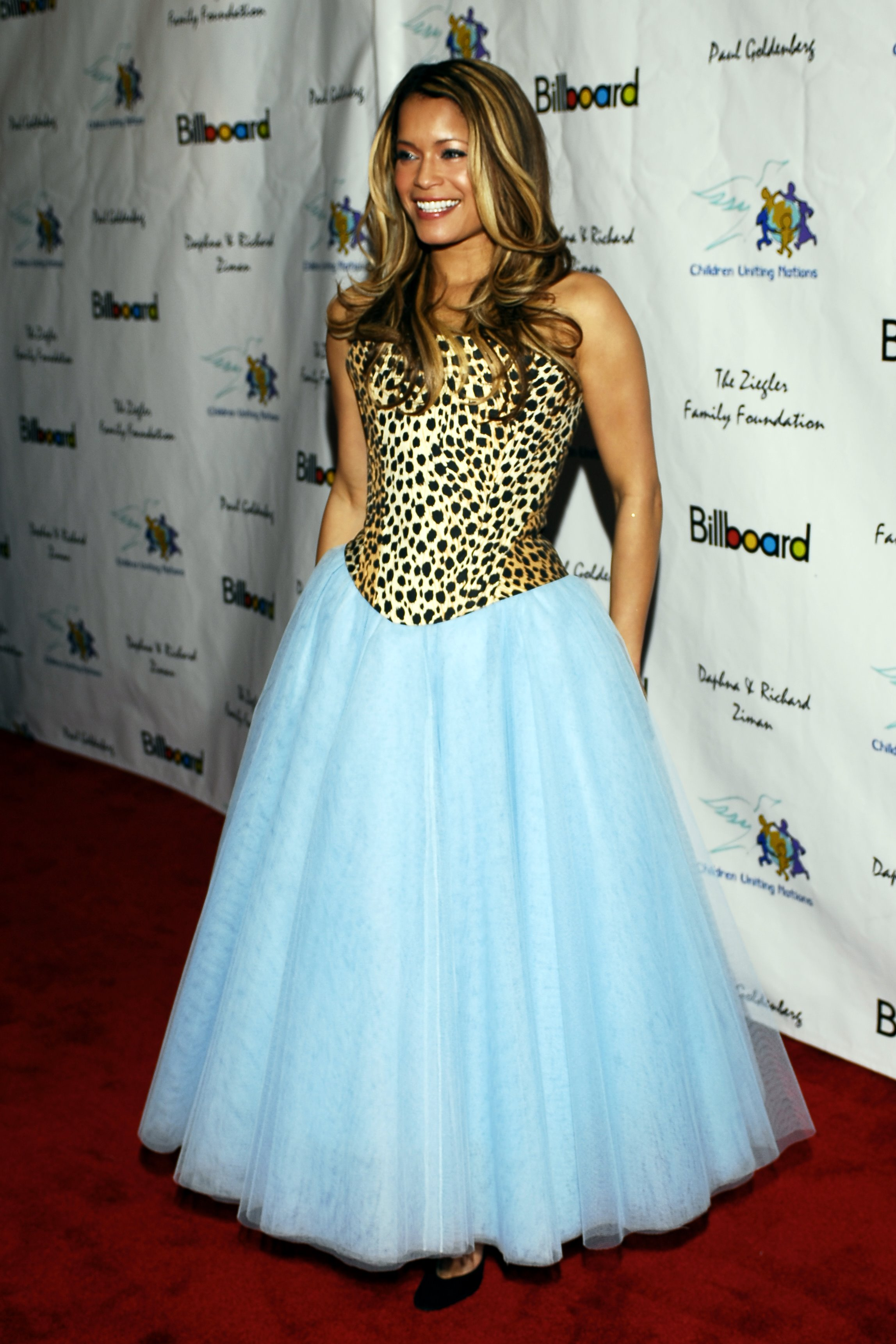
- Cantrell in 2007
- Studio albums: 2
- Compilation albums: 1
- Singles: 5
- Mixtapes: 1
- Featured singles: 1

This is the discography of American singer Blu Cantrell.

In 2001, her debut album, So Blu, was released. The record saw major success when it peaked at number eight on the Billboard 200 chart, eventually going gold in the United States. The album's hit single "Hit 'Em Up Style (Oops!)", which peaked at number two on the US Billboard Hot 100, became the number one most added record to radio in the country, breaking Elvis Presley's record for most played on all genres of radio. The song earned Cantrell Grammy Award nominations for Best Female R&B Vocal Performance and for Best R&B Song, as well as an American Music Award nomination for Favorite Soul/R&B New Artist, both in 2002.

In 2003, Cantrell released her second album, Bittersweet, which peaked at number 37 on the Billboard 200. The success of 'Bittersweet' was much greater worldwide than in the U.S. due to the number one single 'Breathe' which climbed to the top of the charts. The song became number one without the support of any major radio syndication and eventually was added to major rotation after it had already become independently worldwide. The record earned Cantrell a Grammy Award nomination for Best R&B Album and entered the Billboard Top R&B/Hip-Hop Albums chart at number eight. The album produced two hit singles, these being "Breathe" and "Make Me Wanna Scream", the former being a collaboration with Sean Paul. "Breathe" peaked at number one for four weeks in the United Kingdom and broke Madonna's song "Lucky Star" single for most played on British radio stations. It eventually became one of the most successful singles of the year in Europe, Australia, South Africa, and several other countries worldwide.

== Albums ==
=== Studio albums ===
Title	Album details	Peak chart positions							Certifications
Title	Album details	US	US R&B /HH	AUS	FRA	NLD	SWI	UK	Certifications
So Blu	Released: July 31, 2001; Label: Arista; Formats: CD, digital download, LP	8	5	87	—	—	—	—	RIAA: Gold; MC: Gold
Bittersweet	Released: June 21, 2003; Label: Arista; Formats: CD, digital download, LP	37	8	—	91	71	82	20	BPI: Gold

=== Compilation albums ===
Title	Album details
Hit 'Em Up Style: Chart and Club Hits of Blu Cantrell	Released: July 26, 2005; Label: Arista; Formats: CD, digital download, LP

=== Mixtapes ===
Title	Mixtape details
From L.A. to L.O.	Released: 2004^{[A]}; Label: Arista; Formats: CD, digital download, LP

== Singles ==
=== As lead artist ===
Title	Year	Peak chart positions										Certifications	Album
Title	Year	US	AUS	BEL	GER	IRE	NLD	NZ	SWE	SWI	UK	Certifications	Album
"Hit 'Em Up Style (Oops!)"	2001	2	3	46	60	37	10	3	35	77	12	ARIA: Gold; BPI: Gold; RMNZ: 2× Platinum	So Blu
"I'll Find a Way"	2001	—	—	—	—	—	—	—	—	—	—		So Blu
"Till I'm Gone"	2002	—	—	—	—	—	—	—	—	—	—		So Blu
"Breathe" (featuring Sean Paul)	2003	70	8	15	7	1	4	—	14	5	1	ARIA: Gold; BPI: 3× Platinum; BVMI: Gold; RMNZ: 2× Platinum	Bittersweet
"Make Me Wanna Scream" (featuring Ian Lewis)	2004	—	62	—	58	33	—	—	—	60	24		Bittersweet
"—" denotes single that did not chart or was not released in that territory.

=== As featured artist ===
Title	Year	Peak chart positions	Album
Title	Year	US R&B /HH	Album
"Round Up" (Lady May featuring Blu Cantrell)	2002	93	May Day and Bittersweet
"Song of Love for Logan" (Amandla Stenberg featuring Blu Cantrell)	2016	—	Non-album singles
"My World" (Trick Assassins featuring Blu Cantrell)	2016	—	Non-album singles
"Look What You've Done to Me" (Trick Assassins featuring Blu Cantrell)	2016	—	Non-album singles

== Soundtrack appearances ==
Year	Song	Film
2002	"It's Killing Me (In My Mind)"	Bad Company

== Guest appearances ==
Year	Song	Album
2001	"U Remind Me" (Remix) (with Usher and Method Man)	U Got It Bad
2001	"Come My Way" (with Chauncey Black)	non-album song
2004	"Take My Heart" (Kool & the Gang)	The Hits: Reloaded
2008	"They Must Not Know" (RAW & Anonymous)	Worth the Weight
2008	"Feeling Good" (RAW & Anonymous)	Worth the Weight

== Notes ==
- A From L.A. to L.O. was released in 2004 exclusively in the UK and Japan after the success of 2003's Bittersweet. Although its North American release was cancelled, the collection was heavily circulated on the internet and was mistaken as a full follow-up album to Bittersweet.
