= A Toast to Men =

2003 single by Willa Ford

Single by Willa Ford featuring Lady May
- Released: October 27, 2003
- Genre: Pop
- Length: 3:12
- Label: Lava
- Songwriters: Willa Ford; Rhonda Robinson; Toby Gad
- Producer: Toby Gad

Willa Ford singles chronology
"Santa Baby (Gimme, Gimme, Gimme)" (2001)	"A Toast to Men" (2003)

"A Toast to Men" (Note: The song was also known as "F*ck the Men (A Toast to Men)" and "A Toast to the Men (F**k the Men)", with the asterisks used as censors. Some publications used the uncensored version, "Fuck the Men (A Toast to Men)", while discussing the song.) is a song by American singer Willa Ford featuring Lady May. Toby Gad produced the pop track and co-wrote it with Ford and Rhonda Robinson. Ford's record label Lava approached Gad for the collaboration after he was struggling to replicate his success in Europe in the US. Ford wrote the song based on a chant she heard at a sorority party. The title and chorus feature a profane word, which attracted media attention. Ford said she wanted to revolutionize pop music by using the word "fuck", and was surprised her label chose it as a single because of its explicit content.

Lava Records released "A Toast to Men" on October 27, 2003, as the lead single from Ford's second studio album, SexySexObsessive, which was canceled following issues within the record company. A music video and an extended play (EP) of remixes were released to promote the single. Gay.com included the song on a 2003 sampler album, and it was featured in the 2004 film Barbershop 2: Back in Business.

"A Toast to Men" received positive reviews, and some critics praised its feminist message. Although the song's explicit lyrics attracted controversy, it was popular on radio and television. The song peaked at number 45 on the Hot Singles Sales Billboard chart and number 11 on the Dance Singles Sales Billboard chart. After SexySexObsessive was canceled, Ford ended her music career and transitioned into acting and interior design.

== Production and composition ==
"A Toast to Men"
"A Toast to Men" is a pop song with hip hop and dancehall influences. The explicit lyrics were controversial, specifically its use of the word fuck in its chorus and one of its titles.

Following the release of her debut studio album Willa Was Here in 2001, Willa Ford took two years to develop new music. She wrote "A Toast to Men" with Lady May and the song's producer Toby Gad. Ford and Lady May are credited under their legal names Amanda Williford and Rhonda Robinson, respectively. Although Gad was a successful producer in Europe, he had difficulty finding work in the US. He collaborated with Ford at the suggestion of her record label Lava and met her manager David Sonenberg, who would later become his "exclusive manager". Tom Coyne was the mastering engineer for the track.

"A Toast to Men" is a three-minute, 12-second pop song. The Gannett News Service's Elysa Gardner wrote the single had hip hop and dancehall elements. The song includes verses by Lady May, credited as the featured artist. Ford developed the chorus, "Here’s to the men we love / Here’s to the men who love us / Fuck the men, let’s drink to us", after hearing her friends chant it at a sorority party. In a 2003 interview with Rolling Stone, Ford described the lyrics as being about "a bunch of chicks dancing and getting it on in a no-boys-allowed situation". She said she purposefully used profanity to reflect an ongoing "revolution" in how pop music was perceived by the public, explaining: "I wanted it to be sexy and fierce and be OK to say the word 'fuck'."

== Release and promotion ==
On October 27, 2003, Lava Records released "A Toast to Men" to contemporary hit and rhythmic contemporary radio, and later issued it as a digital download and a promotional CD. The single shortens Lady May's name to May. An edited version of the song without the intro was also issued in October 2003, and an extended play (EP) containing four remixes was made available the following month. A music video was released to promote the track further, which Billboard's Chuck Taylor praised as "saucy (but graciously playful", writing it "adds fuel to the flamboyant raunch" of the song. Gay.com included "A Toast to Men" on their 2003 sampler album Gay.com Winter 2003 CD, which they gave as a gift to new subscribers of the website. The song featured in the 2004 film Barbershop 2: Back in Business.

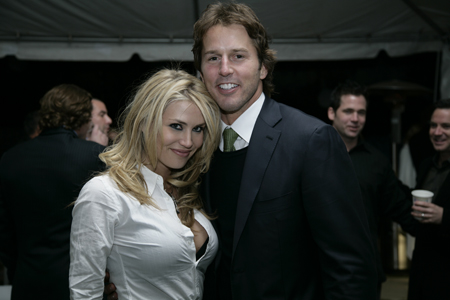
After the song's release, Willa Ford (pictured left in 2013) transitioned out of music and into acting and interior design.

"A Toast to Men" was intended as the lead single from Ford's second studio album Sexysexobsessive, which was scheduled for a 2004 release. Ford was surprised by this choice, believing Lava would not promote something "that racy". Although an edited version was sent to radio, Chuck Taylor said it did little to "hide the pre-dominant hook". The lyrics attracted controversy, and journalists compared it to Eamon's 2003 single "Fuck It (I Don't Want You Back)" since both use "fuck" in their titles. Radio personalities were uncertain how to introduce the songs on air without violating Federal Communications Commission guidelines against the use of profanity.

Despite this, "A Toast to Men" was popular on radio and television. In a 2004 Orlando Weekly interview, Ford said "A Toast to Men" was meant to only be "this club thing"; however, its popularity on radio resulted in it being promoted as a different, more radio-friendly single. "A Toast to Men" peaked at number 45 on the December 6, 2003, on the Hot Singles Sales Billboard chart, and it reached number 11 on the Dance Singles Sales Billboard chart at the same time. Paper's Michael Love Michael said the song, along with Ford's 2001 single "Did Ya' Understand That", were not as successful as her debut single "I Wanna Be Bad" (2001).

Sexysexobsessive was canceled following "record company turnovers and takeovers"; in a 2017 Billboard interview, Ford said she was put in a "no man's land", and attributed these record label issues to her decision to leave the music industry. Afterward, she pursued a career in acting in the mid-2000s, before becoming an interior designer and opening a Los Angeles design firm in 2013. Although Ford talked about music in 2017 and considered touring gay clubs, in 2019 interviews, she said she was not interested in recording new music.

== Critical reception ==
"A Toast to Men" received a positive response from critics. A Maxim contributor praised the single for showing that Ford was "still a hellcat". While interviewing Ford for AskMen, the writer said she had "decided to hit hard again" by releasing the song as her follow-up to Willa Was Here. In Orlando Weekly, Billy Manes enjoyed the "Fuck the Men" part of the title, and described the song as a "mildly trashy rewrite of the recent, angstier Aguilera". In a mixed review, Chuck Taylor described "A Toast to Men" as a "cheap thrill", criticizing its intention to shock the listener as too overt. However, he commended Ford as "one savvy vixen", and praised "the musical vision behind the vamp". In a 2012 Complex article, Tara Aquino and Julian Patterson considered Lady May's featured appearances on other artists' songs, including "A Toast to Men", as a sign that the momentum built from her 2002 single "Round Up" was diminishing.

Some publications praised "A Toast to Men" for its feminist message. Rolling Stone's Gill Kaufman wrote that Ford "transforms a salty sorority chant into a female-empowerment anthem". Michael Love Michael associated the single with feminism because the lyrics focus on "romantic and sexual agency". He commended Ford for "flipping the script for what young women in the pop mainstream could say and how they were expected to behave", writing her objectification of men separated her from other female pop singers.

== Track listings ==
Digital download
No.	Title	Length
1.	"A Toast to Men" (Edited version with Intro)	3:12

EP
No.	Title	Length
1.	"F*ck the Men (A Toast to Men)"	3:12
2.	"F*ck the Men (A Toast to Men)" (Johnny Budz Explicit Mix)	5:58
3.	"F*ck the Men (A Toast to Men)" (Suraci & Jemini Naughty Club Mix)	5:36
4.	"F*ck the Men (A Toast to Men)" (Suraci & Jemini Bad Girl Club Mix)	3:09
5.	"F*ck the Men (A Toast to Men)" (GoodandEvil Explicit Remix)	3:26

== Credits and personnel ==
Credits adapted from Tidal.

- Willa Ford – writer
- Lady May – writer
- Toby Gad – producer
- Tom Coyne – mastering engineer

== Charts ==
Weekly chart performance for "A Toast to Men"
Chart (2003–04)	Peak position
Billboard Hot Singles Sales	45
Billboard Hot Dance Singles Sales	11
US CHR/Pop (Radio & Records)	46
