= Make Me Wanna Scream =

2003 single by Blu Cantrell

- UK CD 1 and European CD single cover

Single by Blu Cantrell featuring Ian Lewis

from the album Bittersweet
- Released: October 6, 2003
- Studio: Circle House (Miami, Florida)
- Length: 3:28
- Label: Arista
- Songwriters: Rodney Richard; Tiffany Cobb; Kandi Burruss
- Producers: Don Vito; Trixter

Blu Cantrell singles chronology
"Breathe" (2002)	"Make Me Wanna Scream" (2003)

Alternative cover
- UK CD 2 cover

"Make Me Wanna Scream" is the second and final single from American R&B singer Blu Cantrell's second studio album, Bittersweet (2003). The song features Ian Lewis from Jamaican reggae band Inner Circle. There are two versions of the song: the original version featuring Ian Lewis and the version with Cantrell alone.

== Music video ==
The video for the song was directed by Hype Williams and shot in 2003. It features Cantrell walking through a city with her friends in the background and of her driving a Mercedes. In the video, she vandalizes her ex-boyfriend's car and spray-paints it, along with some of her girlfriends. The ex-boyfriend, who comes out of his house at the end of the video and notices the girls painting "pig" on his car, was believed to be Simon Webbe (from the English boy band Blue), but it was actually her then-boyfriend Tony De Nero.

== Chart performance ==
Although failing to match the success of previous single "Breathe", "Make Me Wanna Scream" still managed to chart moderately in the United Kingdom, Germany, Austria, Switzerland, Ireland, and Australia. It nonetheless reached number six in Romania.

== Track listings ==
UK CD 1

1. "Make Me Wanna Scream" (MPH remix) – 3:30
2. "Round Up" (Lady May featuring Blu Cantrell) – 4:14

UK CD 2

1. "Make Me Wanna Scream" (MPH remix) – 3:30
2. "Make Me Wanna Scream" (album version featuring Ian Lewis) – 3:32
3. "Round Up" (Lady May featuring Blu Cantrell) – 4:14
4. "Make Me Wanna Scream" (video)

European CD single

1. "Make Me Wanna Scream" (radio mix) – 3:28
2. "Make Me Wanna Scream" (MPH remix) – 3:30
3. "Make Me Wanna Scream" (Mighty House Rocker remix) – 3:29
4. "Make Me Wanna Scream" (Orange Factory remix) – 6:05

== Charts ==
=== Weekly charts ===
Chart (2003–2004)	Peak position
Australia (ARIA)	62
Australian Urban (ARIA)	22
Austria (Ö3 Austria Top 40)	68
Germany (GfK)	58
Ireland (IRMA)	33
Romania (Romanian Top 100)	6
Scotland Singles (OCC)	34
Switzerland (Schweizer Hitparade)	60
UK Singles (OCC)	24
UK Hip Hop/R&B (OCC)	10

=== Year-end charts ===
Chart (2003)	Position
UK Urban (Music Week)	32

== Release history ==
Region	Date	Format(s)	Label(s)	Ref.
United States	October 6, 2003	Rhythmic contemporary radio	Arista	
United Kingdom	December 1, 2003	CD	Arista	
