= Bittersweet (Blu Cantrell album) =

Studio album by Blu Cantrell
- Released: June 24, 2003
- Length: 48:26
- Label: Arista
- Producers: Amen-Ra; Dallas Austin; Kevin "She'kspere" Briggs; Mike City; Shep Crawford; Don Vito; Loren Hill; Jimmy Jam and Terry Lewis; Kwamé; Andrea Martin; Ivan Matias; Wirlie Morris; Troy Oliver; Mark Pitts; Precision; Rich Shelton; Soulshock & Karlin; Trixter; Kevin Veney

Blu Cantrell chronology
| So Blu (2001) | Bittersweet (2003) |

Singles from Bittersweet
- 1. "Breathe" Released: November 18, 2002; 2. "Make Me Wanna Scream" Released: October 6, 2003

Bittersweet is the second studio album by American singer Blu Cantrell, released on June 24, 2003, by Arista Records. For the project, the singer reteamed with mentor Tricky Stewart and worked with a variety of new collaborators, including Mike City, Shep Crawford, Kwamé, Ivan Matias, Troy Oliver, Mark Pitts, and Soulshock & Karlin, selecting songs that resonated with her to create Bittersweet, which she envision as an album of uptempo and relatable tracks for listeners facing relationship challenges.

The album debuted at number 37 on the US Billboard 200 chart, selling 29,000 units in its opening week, and spawned the commercially successful single "Breathe". Despite not matching the domestic success of previous album So Blu (2001), Bittersweet charted in international markets, unlike Cantrell's debut album, performing modestly in certain European nations. It was nominated for a Grammy Award for Best R&B Album at the 46th Grammy Awards, but lost to Luther Vandross' Dance with My Father.

== Background ==
In 2001, Cantrell signed with Arista Records and released her debut album, So Blu. It debuted at number eight on the US Billboard 200 chart and was certified Gold in both the United States and Canada, selling 603,000 copies domestically and featuring the number-two hit single "Hit 'Em Up Style (Oops!)," which earned Cantrell a Grammy Award nomination for Best Female R&B Vocal Performance. Despite the album's success, she acknowledged the unpredictability of the music industry, recalling that her debut was “a big surprise” and describing the business as "like a grab bag. You never know what you're going to get, so you should expect the unexpected. I have a passion and a love for what I do, and that gets me through. I love the fans and making music."

For her next project, Cantrell reteamed with frequent collaborator and producer Tricky Stewart, along with Amen-Ra, Dallas Austin, Mike City, Shep Crawford, and others. While most of the songs had been presented to her and she wrote to them on the spot, occasionally, she was given a song written by someone else that she connected with deeply, such as "Sleep in the Middle," which she felt expressed what she herself would have said. "Impatient","Let Her Go" and "Sleep in the Middle were all tested as Promo Vinyls and Cd's for Radio Markets. Although not strictly autobiographical, Bittersweet features songs that Cantrell believed would resonate with her audience. She challenged herself to make every track exceptional, incorporating more uptempo songs than on her debut. Describing the album as a chapter in a story, she said it was meant for anyone navigating challenges in their relationships. After BMG and Sony Music Entertainment merged in 2004, Reid was fired in January of that year.

== Critical reception ==
Professional ratings
Review scores
| Source | Rating |
|---|---|
| AllMusic | 4/5 stars |
| Blender | 2/5 stars |
| The Guardian | 2/5 stars |
| MTV Asia | 7/10 |
| New York Post | 2.5/4 stars |
| Rolling Stone | 2/5 stars |
| Vibe | 3.5/5 stars |
| The Village Voice | (choice cut) |
| Yahoo! Music UK | 6/10 |

AllMusic editor Tim Sendra called Bittersweet "another fine slice of contemporary R&B propelled above the ordinary by her arresting voice and the sympathetic and interesting production." He found that "the record has a melancholy tinge and Cantrell sings with a depth of emotion that many of her contemporaries can't reach [...] Cantrell is a real talent and Bittersweet is the kind of record fans of modern soul music should champion. Tough, smart, sexy, and impassioned with a sound that shows imagination, it would be a shame if it slipped through the cracks." Billboard declared the project a "perfect showcase for Cantrell's honey-dipped vocals," and cited "Breathe", "Sleep in the Middle", "Make Me Wanna Scream" and Impatient" as highlights. Dan Aquilante from The New York Post found that Cantrell was a "good proponent of [her] style, although she breaks no new ground here." He called Bittersweet a "standard, very competent album."

Writing for Yahoo! Music UK, John Mulvey noted that "Cantrell is much more conservative than her hits might suggest. A lot of the exhaustingly numerous tracks reveal the real Blu Cantrell − as one of those wounded-but-proud, jazz-influenced singers of a certain age." Vibe critic Jason King complimented Cantrell for her "formidable voice" and wrote: "Though her voice lacks distinctive personality, she bowls you over with jazzy vocal licks and a pyrotechnical intensity that's pure Holiness church." King found that the uptempo track on Bittersweet seemed "generic compared to her stunning ballads." Beccy Lindon from The Guardian found it problematic that the "laid-back jazz of Cantrell's debut has been replaced with myriad styles and a more calculated, dancefloor-friendly sound [...] You can't help but feel that this sugar-coated package is meant to attract a mainstream audience rather than develop Cantrell as an artist." Rolling Stone's Barry Walters noted that Bittersweet "still flaunts a dexterity and worldliness that set her apart from her streetbound peers. But lackluster lyrics and mediocre melodies make the poorly sequenced album's overwhelming blandness neither bitter nor sweet."

== Commercial performance ==
Originally slated for release on December 17, 2002, and then delayed to February 11, 2003, Bittersweet was ultimately released on June 24, 2003. It debuted and peaked at number 37 on the US Billboard 200 in the week ending July 12, 2003, with first week sales of 29,000 units. A considerable drop from her previous effort So Blu (2001) which had opened at number eight on the chart, it also reached number eight on the Top R&B/Hip-Hop Albums, becoming Cantrell's second top ten album. In the United Kingdom, Bittersweet peaked at number 20 in the week of August 31, 2003. It was certified silver by the British Phonographic Industry (BPI) on October 3, 2003, followed by a gold certification on July 22, 2013.

In 2004, BMG and Sony Music Entertainment merged, and L.A. Reid, head of BMG's frontline label Arista and the executive who had signed Cantrell, was dismissed in January of that year. Following the merger, Arista artists were transferred to other labels and Cantrell, whose contract was up for renewal, was overlooked in the process, resulting in her becoming a free agent. She welcomed this outcome, as she felt that the promotion of Bittersweet had been mishandled following Reid's departure, and her loyalty to him had left her inclined to leave the label regardless. Consequently, the album became her final release under her recording contract with Arista.

== Track listing ==
Bittersweet track listing
| No. | Title | Writer(s) | Producer(s) | Length |
|---|---|---|---|---|
| 1. | "I Love You" | Kevin Briggs; Blu Cantrell | Kevin "She'kspere" Briggs | 3:48 |
| 2. | "Sleep in the Middle" | Shep Crawford | Crawford | 4:34 |
| 3. | "Unhappy" | Christopher "Tricky" Stewart; Tab; Ebony Burks | Trixter | 4:08 |
| 4. | "Impatient" (featuring Lil' Kim and Fat Joe) | Larry Gates; Michelle Bell | Precision | 5:00 |
| 5. | "Breathe" (featuring Sean Paul) | Andrea Martin; Ivan Matias; Richard Bembery; Melvin Bradford; Stefan Harris; Alvin Joiner; Marshall Mathers; Charles Aznavour | Mark Pitts; Matias; Martin | 3:47 |
| 6. | "Risk It All" | Troy Oliver; Charmelle Cofield | Oliver | 4:59 |
| 7. | "Don't Wanna Say Goodbye" | Carsten Schack; Kenneth Karlin; Mischke Butler; Stevie Wonder | Soulshock & Karlin | 4:01 |
| 8. | "Happily Ever After" | Kevin Veney; Loren Hill; Rich Shelton; Eritza Laues | Hill; Veney; Shelton | 3:49 |
| 9. | "Holding On to Love" | Stewart; Wirlie Morris; Tab; Cantrell | Trixter; Morris | 3:47 |
| 10. | "Let Her Go" | Stewart; Tab; Cantrell | Trixter | 3:25 |
| 11. | "Make Me Wanna Scream" (featuring Ian Lewis of Inner Circle) | Rodney Richard; Cantrell; Kandi Burruss | Don Vito; Trixter | 3:28 |
| 12. | "No Place Like Home" | Mike City | Mike City | 3:44 |
| Total length: | | | | 48:26 |

International edition
| No. | Title | Writer(s) | Producer(s) | Length |
|---|---|---|---|---|
| 1. | "I Love You" | Briggs; Cantrell | Briggs | 3:48 |
| 2. | "Sleep in the Middle" | Crawford | Crawford | 4:34 |
| 3. | "Unhappy" | Stewart; Tab; Burks | Trixter | 4:08 |
| 4. | "Impatient" (featuring Lil' Kim and Fat Joe) | Gates; Bell | Precision | 5:00 |
| 5. | "Breathe" (featuring Sean Paul) | Martin; Matias; Bembery; Bradford; Harris; Joiner; Mathers; Aznavour | Pitts; Martin; Matias | 3:47 |
| 6. | "Hit 'Em Up Style (Oops!)" | Dallas Austin | Austin | 4:12 |
| 7. | "Risk It All" | Oliver; Cofield | Oliver | 4:59 |
| 8. | "Don't Wanna Say Goodbye" | Schack; Karlin; Butler; Wonder | Soulshock & Karlin | 4:01 |
| 9. | "All You Had to Say" | DiAndre Davis; Tab; Cantrell; O.J. Harper | Stewart | 4:24 |
| 10. | "Happily Ever After" | Veney; Hill; Shelton; Laues | Hill; Veney; Shelton | 3:49 |
| 11. | "Holding On to Love" | Stewart; Morris; Tab; Cantrell | Trixter; Morris | 3:47 |
| 12. | "Swingin'" | James Harris III; Terry Lewis; Austin; James Wright | Jimmy Jam & Terry Lewis; Dallas Awesome | 3:59 |
| 13. | "Let Her Go" | Stewart; Tab; Cantrell | Trixter | 3:25 |
| 14. | "Round Up" (Lady May featuring Blu Cantrell) | Ron Lawrence; Kym Holland; Rhonda Robinson; Jason Boyd; Arthur Smith | Ron "Amen-Ra" Lawrence; Kwamé "K-1 Mill" Holland | 4:14 |
| 15. | "Make Me Wanna Scream" (featuring Ian Lewis of Inner Circle) | Richard; Cantrell; Burruss | Don Vito; Trixter | 3:28 |
| 16. | "No Place Like Home" | City | City | 3:44 |
| Total length: | | | | 65:22 |

Sample credits

- "Breathe" contains excerpts and samples from "What's the Difference" by Dr. Dre featuring Eminem and Xzibit.
- "Don't Wanna Say Goodbye" contains excerpts and samples from "Cause We've Ended as Lovers" by Syreeta.
- "Round Up" contains replayed elements from "Dueling Banjos", written by Arthur Smith.

== Charts ==
Weekly chart performance for Bittersweet
| Chart (2003) | Peak position |
|---|---|
| Australian Hitseekers Albums (ARIA) | 14 |
| Australian Urban Albums (ARIA) | 23 |
| Dutch Albums (Album Top 100) | 71 |
| French Albums (SNEP) | 91 |
| Irish Albums (IRMA) | 73 |
| Scottish Albums (Official Charts) | 36 |
| Swiss Albums (Schweizer Hitparade) | 82 |
| UK Albums (Official Charts) | 20 |
| UK R&B Albums (Official Charts) | 5 |
| US Billboard 200 | 37 |
| US Top R&B/Hip-Hop Albums (Billboard) | 8 |

== Certifications ==
Certifications and sales for Bittersweet
| Region | Certification | Certified units/sales |
|---|---|---|
| United Kingdom (BPI) | Gold | 100,000^{*} |
^{*} Sales figures based on certification alone.

== Release history ==
Bittersweet release history
| Region | Date | Label |
|---|---|---|
| United States | June 24, 2003 | Arista |
| Germany | July 21, 2003 | BMG |
| Japan | July 23, 2003 | BMG |
| United Kingdom | July 28, 2003 | Arista |
