= Willa Ford =

American singer (born 1981)

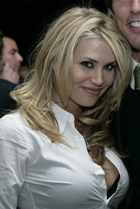
- Ford in 2013

Background information
- Born: Amanda Lee Williford; January 22, 1981 (age 45)
- Genres: Pop, dance-pop
- Occupations: Singer, songwriter, dancer, record producer, presenter, actress, interior decorator
- Years active: 1999–present
- Labels: MCA; Lava/Atlantic
- Website: https://www.iamwillaford.com

Amanda Lee Williford (born January 22, 1981), known by her stage name Willa Ford, is an American interior decorator, singer, songwriter, television personality, film actress, dancer, and model. She released her debut album, Willa Was Here, in 2001. Ford also has appeared in movies such as Friday the 13th (2009), hosted several reality television shows, posed for Playboy and competed on ABC's Dancing with the Stars.

== Early life ==
Ford was raised in Ruskin, Florida. She began singing with the Tampa Bay Children's Choir at age eight. At age 11, she started singing with the Tampa-based children's performing arts troupe, Entertainment Revue. She attended East Bay High School in Gibsonton, Florida.

== Career ==
=== Music career ===
In 1999, the 18-year-old Ford started performing under the stage name Mandah and was signed to MCA. Ford was later bought out of her deal from MCA to be signed by Lava Records and Atlantic Records. Atlantic placed one of Ford's songs, "Lullaby", on the soundtrack for Pokémon: The First Movie. Ford changed her stage name from Mandah to Willa Ford to avoid confusion with Mandy Moore.

In 2000, she was one of the opening acts on the Backstreet Boys' "Into the Millennium" tour.

In 2001, Ford signed to a new label, Lava Atlantic Records, while on a mall tour for Nautica Kids. Ford wrote most of her own lyrics and served as executive producer for most of her first album. On July 17, 2001, she released Willa Was Here. The album included the single "I Wanna Be Bad", which featured rapper Royce da 5'9". Willa Was Here reached 56 on the Billboard 200 and sold approximately 200,000 copies. Ford went on to release a second single from the album, "Did Ya' Understand That", which was released on September 11, 2001, and failed to garner much attention. She would later explain that "Everything that happened that day froze; the world stood still, as it should have. My second single didn't do well because anything that launched that day kind of got canned." "Ooh Ooh" was released as a promotional single, but also failed to find success.

Ford was a spokesperson for Pantene Pro-V's ProVoice campaign while promoting the album. She also appeared in Uncle Kracker's video for "In a Little While". Ford also went on to guest-host MTV's TRL and Say What Karaoke, which led to a hosting contract with Viacom. Ford hosted the MTV reality shows The Morning After and I Bet You Will. In 2001, Ford also co-wrote and recorded a duet with South Korean pop star Park Ji-yoon. The song, titled "Nastified", appeared on Park's fifth album, Man. She was also part of an ad campaign for Six Flags.

In 2003, Ford released a song titled "A Toast to Men". The song, which featured guest rapper Lady May, was featured in daytime promotional ads for soap operas. The single came from her unreleased second album Sexysexobsessive, which was previously titled Porn Poetry. The title track, "Sexysexobsessive", was to be the second single, but it was only released through Ford's official website.

From 2005 to 2006, she appeared as a guest doll in Pussycat Dolls' show at the club in Las Vegas. In 2010, she released her first song since 2003, "All This Time" online, a collaboration with Riley Smith. In 2011, Ford resumed her music career with a performance at The Viper Room in LA. In the performance, she revealed her first solo song since 2003, "Back Back Back". In 2014, she was featured on the song "Rock Tonight" by Eve Nelson and Ray Cervenka.

She would state that after her music did not garner as much success as hoped for, she "really took a step back because I felt like I wasn't doing what I was supposed to be at the time. I know that sounds crazy, but it was the perfect storm, and I walked away," as she would go on to try out many different careers.

After a 22-year hiatus from the music business, Ford returned on October 17, 2025, to release a new single, "Burn Burn". On December 12, she released a cover version of "O Holy Night". In 2026, she released the singles "Love4Life" on January 9, and "Carousel" on February 13, from her second album, Amanda. The album was released on March 6. To celebrate its 25th anniversary, Ford released two new versions of "I Wanna Be Bad", the orchestral version on April 26 and the "Willa's version" on July 17. In September, "I Wanna Be Bad" was used in Calvin Klein's "Feel the Fit" denim campaign starring Sadie Sink.

=== Television, film, and magazine appearances ===
In 2002, Ford appeared in an episode of the short-lived television sitcom Raising Dad, playing a bully named Edie. In 2005, Ford hosted the first season of the reality show The Ultimate Fighter on Spike TV. After the show's finale, Ford was contracted as a summer's guest doll performer for the Las Vegas shows of The Pussycat Dolls. Ford was later featured as the June celebrity on FHM's 2005 pin-up calendar.

In early 2006, Ford played as one of the four celebrity quarterbacks for the Lingerie Bowl, which was shown during the half-time of Super Bowl XL. Later that year, she was featured in a nude pictorial in the March 2006 issue of Playboy. Stuff magazine ranked her No. 48 in the 101 Sexiest Online Women supplement later that year. In fall 2006, Ford competed on the third season of Dancing with the Stars. Ford and her partner, Maksim Chmerkovskiy, were eliminated in the fifth week of competition. She talked about her experience with Maxim in its January 2007 issue.

Ford appeared on an episode of My Celebrity Home on the Style Network, which aired on January 31, 2007 She also hosted the third season of Pants-Off Dance-Off on Fuse TV. On August 23, 2007, Ford and her then-husband, NHL hockey player Mike Modano, were featured in an episode of MTV Cribs.

Ford appeared in the 2009 slasher film Friday the 13th.

Ford played Becca in the direct-to-video Universal Squadrons, which was first shown at the Comic-Con International Independent Film Festival in 2010.

Ford appeared in a 2011 episode of The Glades. In 2012, she appeared in 4 episodes of the Magic City and an episode of Leverage season five. In June 2014, it was announced that she was working on four films: Submerged, Any Day, The Nurse, and Checkmate.

Ford was also cast in the film Assassin's Fury, but was later dropped. In an interview with BZFilm.com, producer Fabio Soldani said that Ford was replaced after five days of shooting and that she was "a nightmare to be around" and "shooting was a really sad place to be for those 5 days".

She currently runs a home interior design business, WFord Interiors.

In 2019, Ford appeared on E!'s reality show Flip It Like Disick.

== Personal life ==
Ford and hockey player Mike Modano married in a small, private ceremony on August 25, 2007, in Athens, Texas. In August 2012, Ford and Modano announced that they were divorcing.

In April 2015, Ford married former NFL linebacker Ryan Nece. In March 2016, it was announced that the couple were expecting their first child. On September 7, 2016, Ford gave birth to a son. In April 2025, she welcomed a daughter via surrogacy.

== Discography ==
=== Albums ===
List of studio albums, with selected chart positions, sales, and certifications
Title	Album details	Peaks
Title	Album details	US
Willa Was Here	Released July 17, 2001; Label: Lava, Atlantic; Format: CD, digital download, streaming	56
Amanda	Release date: March 6, 2026; Label: Willa Ford Music; Format: LP, digital download, streaming	—

=== Singles ===
Year	Title	Peak chart positions							Album
Year	Title	US	US Dance	US Sales	US Pop	US Top 40	US R&R	AUS	Album
2001	"I Wanna Be Bad"	22	4	6	11	19	11	52	Willa Was Here
2001	"Did Ya' Understand That"	—	—	—	—	—	—	—	Willa Was Here
2001	"Santa Baby (Gimme, Gimme, Gimme)"	—	—	—	—	—	—	—	MTV: TRL Christmas
2003	"A Toast to Men" (featuring Lady May)	—	11	45	—	—	46	—	Non-album singles
2004	"Sexy Sex Obsessive"	—	—	—	—	—	—	—	Non-album singles
2025	"Burn Burn"	—	—	—	—	—	—	—	Amanda
2025	"O Holy Night"	—	—	—	—	—	—	—	Non-album single
2026	"Love4Life"	—	—	—	—	—	—	—	Amanda
2026	"Carousel"	—	—	—	—	—	—	—	Amanda
2026	"I Wanna Be Bad" (string orchestral version)	—	—	—	—	—	—	—	Non-album singles
2026	"I Wanna Be Bad" (Willa's version)	—	—	—	—	—	—	—	Non-album singles

== Filmography ==
=== Film ===
Year	Film	Role	Notes
2007	The Anna Nicole Smith Story	Anna Nicole Smith	
2008	Impulse	Claire Dennison	
2009	Friday the 13th	Chelsea	
2011	Universal Squadrons	Becca	
2014	The Nurse	Lynette	
2015	Any Day	Cherry	
2015	Checkmate	Sasha	
2016	A Father's Secret/Hunt for Truth	Carrie Evans	TV film Entitled Enquête sécrète in France.
2016	Submerged	Carla	

=== Television ===
Year	Title	Role	Notes
2001	The Mind of the Married Man	Popstar	
2002	I Bet You Will	Host	
2002	Raising Dad	Edie	
2002	The Morning After	Host	
2002	Miss Teen USA	Host	
2003	Jimmy Kimmel Live!	Guest appearance	
2005	The Ultimate Fighter	Host	
2006	Lingerie Bowl III	Celebrity Quarterback for the Dallas Desire	
2006	Calvin Ayre WildCard Poker	Player	
2006	Dancing with the Stars	Celebrity Dancer	
2006	Jimmy Kimmel Live!	Guest appearance	
2006	Live with Regis and Kelly	Guest appearance	
2007	Pants Off Dance Off	Host	
2007	Red Eye	Guest Appearance	
2007	MTV Cribs	Introduced her home	
2007	My Celebrity Home	Introduced her home	
2010	Chelsea Lately	Guest appearance	
2011	The Glades	Shelby Adams	Episode: "'shine"
2012	Magic City	Janice Michaels	4 episodes
2012	Leverage	Tabatha Delavega	Episode: "The Low Low Price Job"
2019	Flip It Like Disick	Herself	

=== Music videos ===
Year	Title	Artist
2001	"I Wanna Be Bad"	Herself
2001	"Did Ya' Understand That"	Herself
2001	"Santa Baby (Gimme, Gimme, Gimme)"	Herself
2002	"In a Little While"	Uncle Kracker
2003	"A Toast to Men"	Herself
2011	"Burn It Down"	Awolnation
2025	"Burn Burn"	Herself
2026	"Love4life"	Herself
2026	"Carousel"	Herself
2026	"Disassosiate"	Herself
2026	"How Do You Like Me Now"	Herself
2026	"I Wanna Be Bad - String Orchestral Version"	Herself
2026	"Flex"	Herself

=== Other ===
Television live performances

- Teensasion Hard Rock Live
- Total Request Live
- The Tonight Show with Jay Leno
- Live with Regis and Kelly
- All That
- The Today Show
- The Kelly Clarkson Show

Television commercials

- Six Flags Magic Mountain

Events

- Pantene Pro-Voice Live
- Guavaween
