= I Won't Be Home for Christmas =

1997 Christmas song by Blink-182

Single by Blink-182
- Released: October 16, 2001
- Recorded: October 1997
- Studio: Big Fish Studios (Encinitas, California)
- Genre: Pop-punk; Punk rock; alternative rock; emo; Christmas music
- Length: 3:16
- Label: MCA
- Songwriters: Mark Hoppus; Tom DeLonge; Scott Raynor
- Producer: Mark Trombino

Blink-182 singles chronology
"First Date" (2001)	"I Won't Be Home for Christmas" (2001)	"Stay Together for the Kids" (2002)

"I Won't Be Home for Christmas" is a Christmas song by the American rock band Blink-182. Written by band members Mark Hoppus, Tom DeLonge, and Scott Raynor, it was originally released as a promotional single in 1997 before being reissued commercially on October 16, 2001, via MCA Records. A parody of Bing Crosby's Christmas standard "I'll Be Home for Christmas," the song combines the band's fast-paced pop-punk sound with traditional holiday motifs, like sleigh bells. The song depicts a cynical man who rejects holiday cheer by attacking a group of Christmas carolers, ultimately spending Christmas Eve in jail. It was recorded in October 1997 at Big Fish Studios in Encinitas, California, and was produced by Mark Trombino.

Although not initially issued as a commercial single, "I Won't Be Home for Christmas" became a perennial holiday favorite through repeated appearances on Christmas compilation albums. Following its reissue as a commercial single, it reached number one on Billboard's Canadian Singles Chart, becoming Blink-182's only chart-topping single in Canada. Retrospective critics have regarded it as one of punk's most enduring Christmas songs, and it marked the first of several holiday-themed recordings by the band.

== Background and recording ==
In June 1997, Blink-182 released their second studio album, Dude Ranch. Receiving largely positive reviews from critics, the band joined the 1997 Warped Tour in support of the album. After temporarily returning to the studio in late–1997, the band conceived two new songs, "I Won't Be Home for Christmas" and "Mutt". Both songs were written by band members Mark Hoppus, Tom DeLonge, and Scott Raynor.—with Raynor being replaced with Travis Barker as the band's drummer the year after the songs were recorded. Blink-182 recorded "I Won't Be Home for Christmas" and "Mutt" with producer Mark Trombino at Big Fish Studios in Encinitas, California in October 1997, where they had previously recorded Dude Ranch. The title of "I Won't Be Home for Christmas" parodies Bing Crosby's holiday classic, "I'll Be Home for Christmas".

== Composition and lyrics ==
"I Won't Be Home for Christmas" is a pop-punk, punk rock, alternative rock, and emo song with a length of three minutes and 16 seconds. It is built around melodic guitar and bass riffs and energetic drumming. The arrangement incorporates several Christmas motifs, opening with a choral rendition of "Deck the Halls" before introducing church bells and sleigh bells, while retaining the band's aggressive, hook-driven style throughout. Hoppus performs the verses in a deadpan vocal style, while the closing chorus features both Hoppus and DeLonge singing together over driving drums and sleigh bells.

Lyrically, the song satirizes traditional Christmas songs by replacing sentimental holiday themes with dark humor. The lyrics follow a misanthropic narrator whose contempt for Christmas traditions steadily escalates throughout the song. Rejecting the cheer of Christmas carolers, gift-givers, and family obligations, he repeatedly implores visitors to "leave the presents and then leave me alone." The song's chorus reiterates this disdain: "It’s time to be nice to the people who / You can’t stand all year / I’m growing tired of this Christmas cheer." His hostility culminates in an assault on a group of carolers with a baseball bat, leading to his arrest and imprisonment on Christmas Eve.

== Release and commercial performance ==
"I Won't Be Home for Christmas" was first released as a radio promotional single in 1997. It was recorded for KROQ's Kevin & Bean for inclusion on their Santa's Swingin' Sack (1998) holiday compilation album. It has since been re-released several times as a part of various holiday compilations. At the height of the band's TRL fame, it was included on the 2001 MTV: TRL Christmas collection. In 2003, it made an appearance on A Santa Cause: It's a Punk Rock Christmas via Immortal Records. The song marked the first of several Christmas-themed recordings by Blink-182, preceding later holiday songs including "Happy Holidays, You Bastard" (2001), "Boxing Day" (2012), and "Not Another Christmas Song" (2019).

"I Won't Be Home for Christmas" was reissued as a commercial single on October 16, 2001, with a maxi single release following the next month on November 27. The song reached number one on Billboard's Canadian Singles Chart, becoming Blink-182's only chart-topping single in Canada. The single debuted at number two on the chart dated November 17, 2001, before reaching number one two weeks later on December 1. It spent six non-consecutive weeks atop the chart, alternating with U2's "Stuck in a Moment You Can't Get Out Of" and Enya's "Only Time." It also made the year-end charts of best-performing singles in the country for both 2001 and 2002. Blink-182 have rarely performed the song live, typically reserving it for holiday-themed events such as the 2011 and 2016 KROQ Almost Acoustic Christmas.

== Critical reception ==
"I Won't Be Home for Christmas" has been regarded as one of alternative rock's most enduring holiday songs. Billboard have ranked it several times among the best holiday rock songs. Writing for The A.V. Club, Leonardo Adrian Garcia described "I Won't Be Home for Christmas" as one of the genre's defining original holiday songs, observing that "Yes, it’s juvenile, filled with cartoonish violence and sophomoric prison sex humor, but it also captured the band at its effortlessly energetic, palm-muted peak, post-Dude Ranch, pre-Enema Of The State." MSN Canada called the song "a high-energy punk war on Christmas". Noisey's Alex Robert Ross credited the song with outlasting most pop-punk Christmas songs, arguing that its blend of irreverent humor, juvenile sexuality, and melodic pop-punk made it a defining entry in the genre's holiday canon. In a retrospective review, Alternative Press called "I Won't Be Home for Christmas" a "timeless pop-punk Christmas classic." Chris Coplan of the Phoenix New Times described the song as a "true classic", while of Craig Hlavaty of the Houston Press noted that despite its age "[it] still makes us smile."

== Personnel ==
Credits are adapted from the liner notes of "I Won't Be Home For Christmas".

Blink-182

- Mark Hoppus – vocals, bass guitar
- Tom DeLonge – vocals, guitar
- Scott Raynor – drums

== Charts ==
=== Weekly charts ===
Weekly chart performance for "I Won't Be Home for Christmas"
Chart (2001–2002)	Peak position
Canada (Nielsen SoundScan)	1

=== Year-end charts ===
2001 year-end chart performance for "I Won't Be Home for Christmas"
Chart (2001)	Position
Canada (Nielsen SoundScan)	3

2002 year-end chart performance for "I Won't Be Home for Christmas"
Chart (2002)	Position
Canada (Nielsen SoundScan)	41
