= Breathe (Blu Cantrell song) =

2002 single by Blu Cantrell

Single by Blu Cantrell featuring Sean Paul

from the album Bittersweet
- Released: November 18, 2002
- Studio: Sound on Sound Recording (New York City)
- Length: 3:25 (album version); 3:48 (single version)
- Label: Arista; BMG
- Songwriters: Andrea Martin; Ivan Matias; Richard Bembery; Melvin Bradford; Stephon Harris; Alvin Joiner; Marshall Mathers; Charles Aznavour
- Producers: Andrea Martin; Ivan Matias; Mark Pitts

Blu Cantrell singles chronology
"Round Up" (2002)	"Breathe" (2002)	"Make Me Wanna Scream" (2003)

Sean Paul singles chronology
"Get Busy" (2003)	"Breathe" (2003)	"Like Glue" (2003)

"Breathe" is a song by American singer Blu Cantrell from her second studio album, Bittersweet (2003). A remixed version featuring Jamaican musician Sean Paul was released as a single in February 2003, several months after the album version was released in November 2002. The album version of this song was produced and co-written by Ivan Matias and Andrea Martin. The remix featuring Sean Paul was produced by Ivan Matias, Andrea Martin, and Mark Pitts. The song peaked at 70 on the US Billboard Hot 100 and became a hit in Europe, most notably in the United Kingdom, where it topped the UK Singles Chart for four weeks in August 2003.

== Background and recording ==
"Breathe" was originally recorded for the Bittersweet album without Sean Paul, but his vocals were added for the single release. The song uses a slightly altered instrumental of Dr. Dre's 1999 song "What's the Difference" featuring Eminem and Xzibit, which in turn revolved around a sample from Charles Aznavour's 1966 song "Parce Que Tu Crois". In an interview with the Metro, when asked what it was like to work with Dre, Cantrell said, "It was a remix, so I never actually got to meet him. They were his beats, but it was actually produced by another girl, Andrea Martin, and Ivan Matias. If I had to choose, I much prefer the remix to the original."

== Chart performance ==
"Breathe" did not achieve the same level of success as Cantrell's "Hit 'Em Up Style (Oops!)" in her native US, peaking at number 70 on the Billboard Hot 100 in August 2003, but did stay on the chart for 20 weeks.

The song achieved greater success outside of the United States. In the United Kingdom, "Breathe" debuted and peaked at the top of the UK Singles Chart on August 3, 2003 – for the week ending date August 9, 2003 – becoming both Cantrell's and Paul's first chart-topping song in Britain. It spent four weeks at the summit of the chart, replacing Daniel Bedingfield's "Never Gonna Leave Your Side". "Breathe" was eventually dethroned from the top of the chart by the 2003 remix of Elton John's "Are You Ready for Love". It became Britain's eighth-biggest-selling single of 2003, with sales of 330,000, and has since sold over 410,000 copies there.

== Music video ==
The music video was directed by Hype Williams.

== Track listings ==
US 12-inch single (solo version)

A1. "Breathe" (radio mix) – 3:20
A2. "Breathe" (instrumental) – 3:19
B1. "Breathe" (radio mix) – 3:20
B2. "Breathe" (acappella) – 3:20

US 12-inch single (Sean Paul version)

A1. "Breathe" (rap version featuring Sean Paul) – 3:48
A2. "Breathe" (instrumental) – 3:45
A3. "Breathe" (rap version acappella featuring Sean Paul) – 3:48
B1. "Breathe" (rap version featuring E-40) – 3:45
B2. "Breathe" (instrumental) – 3:40
B3. "Breathe" (rap version acappella featuring E-40) – 3:43

US 7-inch single

A. "Breathe" (rap version featuring Sean Paul) – 3:48
B. "Breathe" (original version) – 3:20

European CD single

1. "Breathe" (rap version featuring Sean Paul—radio mix) – 3:49
2. "Breathe" (no rap version—radio mix) – 3:21

European and Australian maxi-CD single

1. "Breathe" (rap version featuring Sean Paul—radio mix) – 3:49
2. "Breathe" (no rap version—radio mix) – 3:21
3. "Breathe" (Andy & The Lamboy radio edit) – 3:43
4. "Breathe" (instrumental) – 3:45

UK CD single

1. "Breathe" (rap version featuring Sean Paul)
2. "Breathe" (radio mix)
3. "Breathe" (Ed Funk & D Rok Remix)

== Credits and personnel ==
Credits are taken from the UK CD single liner notes.

Studio

- Recorded and mixed at Sound on Sound Recording Studios (New York City)

Personnel

- Andrea Martin – writing, background vocals, production
- Charles Aznavour – writing
- Richard Bembery – writing
- Melvin Bradford – writing
- Stephon Harris – writing
- Alvin Joiner – writing
- Marshall Mathers – writing
- Ivan Matias – writing, production
- Blu Cantrell – vocals, background vocals
- Sean Paul – featured vocals
- Mark Pitts – production of Sean Paul version, mixing
- Brian "B" Stanley – recording
- Victor Mancusi – recording, mixing
- Rene Antelmann – mixing assistance
- Bojan Dugich – mixing assistance
- C. "Tricky" Stewart – executive production
- Antonio "LA" Reid – executive production
- Joe Mama-Nitzberg – creative direction
- Courtney Walter – art direction and design
- Adam S. Wahler – art direction and design
- Randy Jones – production coordination
- Sheryl Nields – photography

== Charts ==
=== Weekly charts ===
Weekly chart performance for "Breathe"
Chart (2003–2004)	Peak position
Australia (ARIA)	8
Australian Urban (ARIA)	3
Austria (Ö3 Austria Top 40)	11
Belgium (Ultratop 50 Flanders)	22
Belgium (Ultratop 50 Wallonia)	15
Croatia (HRT)	3
Denmark (Tracklisten)	7
Europe (European Hot 100)	1
France (SNEP)	13
Germany (GfK)	7
Hungary (Dance Top 40)	3
Hungary (Single Top 40)	8
Ireland (IRMA)	1
Italy (FIMI)	28
Netherlands (Dutch Top 40)	4
Netherlands (Single Top 100)	4
Norway (VG-lista)	6
Romania (Romanian Top 100)	1
Scotland Singles (Official Charts)	2
Sweden (Sverigetopplistan)	14
Switzerland (Schweizer Hitparade)	5
UK Singles (Official Charts)	1
UK Hip Hop/R&B (Official Charts)	1
US Billboard Hot 100	70
US Dance Club Songs (Billboard) Remixes	17
US Dance Airplay (Billboard)	22
US Hot R&B/Hip-Hop Songs (Billboard)	83
US Pop Airplay (Billboard)	36
US Rhythmic Airplay (Billboard)	23

=== Year-end charts ===
Year-end chart performance for "Breathe"
Chart (2003)	Position
Australia (ARIA)	52
Austria (Ö3 Austria Top 40)	65
Belgium (Ultratop 50 Wallonia)	85
France (SNEP)	97
Germany (Media Control GfK)	39
Ireland (IRMA)	17
Netherlands (Dutch Top 40)	45
Netherlands (Single Top 100)	57
Romania (Romanian Top 100)	99
Sweden (Hitlistan)	78
Switzerland (Schweizer Hitparade)	15
UK Singles (OCC)	8
UK Urban (Music Week)	5
US Rhythmic Top 40 (Billboard)	92

== Certifications ==
Certifications and sales for "Breathe"
Region	Certification	Certified units/sales
Australia (ARIA)	Gold	35,000^{^}
Denmark (IFPI Danmark)	Gold	45,000^{‡}
Germany (BVMI)	Gold	150,000^{‡}
New Zealand (RMNZ)	2× Platinum	60,000^{‡}
Norway (IFPI Norway)	Gold	5,000^{*}
United Kingdom (BPI)	3× Platinum	1,800,000^{‡}
^{*} Sales figures based on certification alone.^{^} Shipments figures based on certification alone.^{‡} Sales+streaming figures based on certification alone.

== Release history ==
Release dates and formats for "Breathe"
Region	Version	Date	Format(s)	Label(s)	Ref.
United States	Solo	November 18, 2002	Rhythmic contemporary; urban radio	Arista	
United States	Sean Paul	February 3, 2003	Contemporary hit radio	Arista	
United States	Solo	May 5, 2003	Contemporary hit radio	Arista	
Finland	Both	June 30, 2003	CD	Arista; BMG	
Australia	Both	July 21, 2003	CD	Arista; BMG	
United Kingdom	Sean Paul	July 28, 2003	12-inch vinyl; CD	Arista; BMG	
Denmark	Both	August 25, 2003	CD	Arista; BMG	

== See also ==
- List of Romanian Top 100 number ones of the 2000s
