= Willa Was Here =

2001 album by Willa Ford

Studio album by Willa Ford
- Released: July 17, 2001
- Recorded: 2001
- Studio: The Dojo (Jackson, NJ); Battery Studios (New York, NY); Protopia (New York, NY); 22nd Street Studios (New York, NY); Big Baby Recording (New York, NY); Milkman Studios (New Jersey); Record Plant (Los Angeles, CA); Chung King (New York, NY); The Hirsh Compound (Los Angeles, CA); Soundtracks (New York, NY)
- Genre: Pop; dance-pop
- Length: 39:12
- Label: Lava; Atlantic
- Producer: Andy Marvel; Anthony Acid; Brian & Josh; DJ Skribble; Eve Nelson; Falonte Moore; Howie Hersh; Kenny Gioia; Rob Fusari; Robbie Nevil; Shep Goodman; Tim & Bob

Singles from Willa Was Here
- 1. "I Wanna Be Bad" Released: April 24, 2001; 2. "Did Ya' Understand That" Released: September 11, 2001

Professional ratings
Review scores
Source	Rating
AllMusic	2.5/5 stars

Willa Was Here is the debut studio album by American singer Willa Ford. It was released on July 17, 2001, via Lava/Atlantic Records.

Recording sessions took place at The Dojo and Milkman Studios in New Jersey, at Battery Studios, Protopia, 22nd Street Studios, Big Baby Recording, Chung King and Soundtracks in New York City, and at Record Plant and The Hirsh Compound in Los Angeles.

Production was handled by Andy Marvel, Brian & Josh, Eve Nelson, Anthony Acid, DJ Skribble, Falonte Moore, Howie Hersh, Kenny Gioia, Rob Fusari, Robbie Nevil, Shep Goodman, and Tim & Bob, with Andy Shane, Jason Flom and Willa Ford serving as executive producers.

In the United States, the album debuted at number fifty-six on the Billboard 200 and lasted two months on the chart. Its lead single, "I Wanna Be Bad", made it to number twenty-two on the US Billboard Hot 100 chart. As of November 2003, the single sold over 250,000 copies in the US alone. The second single off of the album, "Did Ya' Understand That", was released on September 11, 2001 and failed to chart. Between the main two singles, the song "Ooh Ooh" was released as a promotional single, but failed to chart as well. The album also contained a hyperlink to the music video for "I Wanna Be Bad".

== Track listing ==
No.	Title	Writer(s)	Producer(s)	Length
1.	"I Wanna Be Bad"	Amanda Lee Williford; Joshua Michael Schwartz; Brian Kierulf	Josh; Brian	3:06
2.	"Did Ya' Understand That"	Williford; Michael Goodman; Kenny Gioia; Darius Rustam	Shep Goodman; Kenny Gioia	3:17
3.	"Ooh Ooh"	Williford; Eve Nelson	Eve Nelson	3:32
4.	"Tired"	Williford; Andrew Michael Saidenberg	Andy Marvel	3:33
5.	"Joke's on You"	Williford; Sabelle Breer; Rob Fusari; Falonte Moore	Rob Fusari; Fonz	3:16
6.	"Tender"	Tim Kelley; Bob Robinson	Tim & Bob	4:18
7.	"Don't You Wish"	Williford; Nelson	Eve Nelson	3:51
8.	"Prince Charming"	Williford; Saidenberg	Andy Marvel	4:01
9.	"Somebody Take the Pain Away"	Kierulf; Schwartz; Sheron Lee; Annie Lennox; David A. Stewart	Brian; Josh	2:53
10.	"Haunted Heart"	Williford; Howard B. Hersh; Robbie Nevil	Howie Hersh; Robbie Nevil	3:39
11.	"Dare"	Williford; Scott Ialacci; Anthony Caputo	DJ Skribble; Anthony Acid	3:46
Total length:				39:12

Australian edition bonus track
No.	Title	Writer(s)	Producer(s)	Length
12.	"All the Right Moves"	Johnny Pedersen; Karsten Dahlgaard; Michael Jay Margules	Jam & Delgado	3:26

Sample credits

- Track 9 contains an interpolation of "Here Comes the Rain Again" by Eurythmics.

Notes

- Royce da 5'9" has an uncredited rap verse on "I Wanna Be Bad".

== Personnel ==
- Amanda "Willa Ford" Williford – vocals, vocal arrangement, executive producer
- Jennifer Carr – additional background vocals (tracks: 5, 9), vocal arrangement (track 5)
- Sabelle Breer – additional background vocals & vocal arrangement (track 5)
- Joshua M. "Josh" Schwartz – additional guitar (track 1), producer & recording (tracks: 1, 9)
- Brian Kierulf – programming (track 1), producer & recording (tracks: 1, 9), string arrangement (track 9)
- Darius Rustam – keyboard programming (track 2)
- Michael "Shep" Goodman – drum programming, producer, recording & mixing (track 2)
- Kenny Gioia – drum programming, producer, recording & mixing (track 2)
- Eve Nelson – keyboards, producer, engineering & mixing (tracks: 3, 7), programming (track 3), drum programming (track 7)
- Masa Shimizu – guitar (tracks: 3, 7)
- Robin Daniels – percussion (track 3)
- Andrew Michael "Andy Marvel" Saidenberg – keyboards, programming, producer, arranger, recording & mixing (tracks: 4, 8)
- Gerry Leonard – guitar (tracks: 4, 8)
- Alan Friedman – Pro Tools (tracks: 4, 8)
- Rob Fusari – programming, producer & mixing (track 5)
- Falonte "Fonz" Moore – programming & producer (track 5)
- Tim Kelley – keyboards, bass, drums, programming, producer & engineering (track 6)
- Bob Robinson – guitar, piano, producer & engineering (track 6)
- Michael Nigro – keyboards (track 11)
- Howie Hersh – producer (track 10)
- Robbie Nevil – producer (track 10)
- Scott "DJ Skribble" Ialacci – producer (track 11)
- Anthony "Acid" Caputo – producer (track 11)
- Stephen George – recording (track 1), engineering (track 9)
- Rob Chiarelli – mixing (tracks: 1, 6, 9–11)
- Benjamin Jelen – engineering assistant (tracks: 3, 7)
- Jim Caruso – mixing (tracks: 4, 8)
- Jay Nichlas – mixing assistant (tracks: 4, 8)
- Bill Lee – mixing (track 5)
- Manolo Marroquín – mixing (track 6)
- Cynthia Daniels – vocal production effect (track 7)
- Tom Coyne – mastering
- Jason Flom – executive producer, A&R
- Andy Shane – executive producer, A&R
- Gregg Nadel – A&R
- Christina Dittmar – art direction & design
- Mark Seliger – photography

== Charts ==
Chart (2001)	Peak position
US Billboard 200	56
