= MTV: TRL Christmas =

Compilation album by Various Artists
- Released: October 30, 2001
- Recorded: October – November 2000
- Genres: Christmas; pop
- Labels: Atlantic; Lava
- Producers: Jason Flom (exec.); Gregg Nadel (exec.); Amy DeRousen (exec.); Kevin Mangini (exec.)

Singles from MTV: TRL Christmas
- 1. "Santa Baby (Gimme, Gimme, Gimme)" Released: December 4, 2001

MTV: TRL Christmas is a Christmas compilation album released by the record labels Atlantic and Lava. Released on October 30, 2001, it features singers who were promoted on the music television series Total Request Live. The album consists of sixteen songs, including covers of Christmas standards and carols, as well as original music. Music critics identified several musical genres, such as pop punk and bubblegum pop, throughout the album. Several tracks from MTV: TRL Christmas had been featured on the artists' previous projects.

MTV: TRL Christmas received mainly mixed-to-negative reviews from critics, though they chose specific performers and songs as highlights. The album's track listing was a source of criticism. The album reached number 162 on the Billboard 200 chart and number 13 on the Holiday Album Sales Billboard chart. "Santa Baby (Gimme, Gimme, Gimme), performed by American singer Willa Ford, was released as the album's lead single and was promoted through an accompanying music video. Critical response to the single was mixed; some critics praised Ford's performances while others panned the focus on consumerism in the lyrics.

== Composition and sound ==
Recorded between October 2000 and November 2000, MTV: TRL Christmas is a Christmas compilation album containing sixteen songs. Executive producers for the album are Jason Flom, Gregg Nadel, Amy DeRousen, and Kevin Mangini. The tracks are performed by singers who had been promoted on the music television series Total Request Live. It includes covers of Christmas standards and carols, as well as original music. The Deseret News' Scott Iwasaki and Carma Wadley said the album does not contain "what you might consider traditional Christmas music".

Music critics identified several musical genres throughout the album. Stephen Thomas Erlewine of AllMusic wrote that a "series of punk-pop holiday tunes" is featured on the project; he cited Weezer's version of "The Christmas Song", P.O.D.'s "Rock the Party", Smash Mouth's song "Better Do It Right", and Canadian band Simple Plan's track "My Christmas List" as examples. Agreeing the album contains pop punk material, Entertainment Weekly's Chris Willman said it includes "vocal-group bubblegum", listing Christina Aguilera's version of "Angels We Have Heard on High" and LFO's song "Red Letter Day" as representatives of this sound.

In the opening track, "Santa Baby (Gimme Gimme Gimme)", Willa Ford asks Santa for extravagant presents, such as homes in New York City and Los Angeles, attractive male servants, and men in swimming trunks. The chorus consists of Ford singing; "Gimme gimme gimme". Several critics identified the song as a parody or cover of Eartha Kitt's 1953 single "Santa Baby"; Ford's performance was compared with those of Britney Spears and Destiny's Child. For the second track "I Don't Wanna Spend One More Christmas Without You", NSYNC offers a pop interpretation of Christmas music. TLC's interpretation of "Sleigh Ride" contains elements of soul music and hip hop, while P.O.D.'s "Rock the Party" incorporates influences from industrial music. Jimmy Fallon provides a hard rock version of a Christmas song on the track "Snowball". Various music commentators noted that Sugar Ray recorded a faithful cover of The Beach Boys' 1963 single "Little Saint Nick". The album closes with a more traditional Christmas sound of Trans-Siberian Orchestra's 2001 single "Christmas Canon".

Several tracks from MTV: TRL Christmas had been featured on the artists' previous projects. Weezer's version of "The Christmas Song" was included on their 2001 self-titled album and their Christmas album. Aguilera's interpretation of "Angels We Have Heard on High" was included on her 2000 record My Kind of Christmas, and Blink-182 had previously released their single "I Won't Be Home for Christmas" in 1997. "Christmas Canon" was part of Trans-Siberian Orchestra's 1998 release The Christmas Attic.

== Release and promotion ==
MTV: TRL Christmas was released on October 30, 2001, through Atlantic and Lava, as a CD and a cassette. To promote the album, a limited quantity of copies contained tickets for a free trip to be a part of the Total Request Live studio audience in New York City. Commentators noted the record was a way to publicize the new artists from Atlantic and Lava, such as Little-T and One Track Mike, Angela Via, and Willa Ford.

"Santa Baby (Gimme Gimme Gimme)" was released as the lead single from MTV: TRL Christmas on December 4, 2001, and was promoted with an accompanying music video. Critical response to the song was mixed. A writer from The New York Times referenced the track as "a high-gloss ode to Christmas materialism", and Melinda Newman of Billboard described Ford's performance as "kittenish". The Herald News' Annie Alleman called the song "sultry", and praised the way it was paired with NSYNC's "I Don't Wanna Spend One More Christmas Without You". Other commentators were more negative about the single. Stephen Thomas Erlewine viewed it as "a truly disgusting materialistic anthem", criticizing the lyrics' reliance on commercialism and sexuality. Dan DeLuca of Knight Ridder panned the track as "shamelessly acquisitive", and a writer for the Star Tribune said its emphasis on greed was inappropriate for the holiday season. Steve Morse of The Boston Globe described the single as "depressing" and interpreted Ford's vocals as "disco-bleating". Heather Phares, writing for AllMusic, criticized Ford for removing the fun and campy attitude from its inspiration, "Santa Baby".

== Reception ==
Music critics praised certain songs on MTV: TRL Christmas; Sandi Davis of The Oklahoman recommended the album to fans of rock music. The Houston Press' Craig Hlavaty praised the album for its inclusion of Sugar Ray, Blink-182, Smash Mouth, and Simple Plan. Gary C.W. Chun of the Honolulu Star-Bulletin commended the album for its inclusion of "anti-Christmas songs", such as "I Won't Be Home for Christmas", and original material by Smash Mouth, Little T and One Track Mike, and Jimmy Fallon. While more critical of the album as a whole, other commentators chose specific tracks as highlights. The Pitch's Robert Bishop wrote that tracks by Weezer and Blink-182 were highlights but dismissed the album by writing; "the coal lumps outweigh the worthy gifts". Giving MTV: TRL Christmas a "C", Chris Willman said it contains only "a few signs of intelligent life", including tracks by Sugar Ray and Smash Mouth, but criticized most of its content as either generic bubblegum pop or pop punk music.

The selection of songs for the album was the subject of criticism. Scott Mavis wrote that the album's track listing was tolerable but that the record label should have split the pop and rock material into two separate releases. Stephen Thomas Erlewine panned the song choices for the album, writing that it was unstructured and would not appeal to its target audience of young adults. A writer from the Orlando Weekly also criticized the track listing, writing; "the record doesn't promise much more than a red-and-green-hued version of the current pop-chart promiscuity". In a more positive review, Heather Phares praised a majority of the album's songs and wrote that it "has enough good moments to make it a decent stocking stuffer".

MTV: TRL Christmas reached number 162 on the Billboard 200 chart in December 2001. It peaked at number 13 on the Holiday Album Sales Billboard chart on January 19, 2002, and remained on the chart for nine weeks.

== Track listing ==
Credits adapted from AllMusic:

No.	Title	Writer(s)	Performer	Length
1.	"Santa Baby (Gimme, Gimme, Gimme)"	Willa Ford; Eve Nelson	Willa Ford	3:43
2.	"I Don't Wanna Spend One More Christmas Without You"	Andrew Fromm	*NSYNC	4:02
3.	"Angels We Have Heard on High"	Traditional	Christina Aguilera	4:08
4.	"Sleigh Ride"	Leroy Anderson; Mitchell Parish	TLC	3:44
5.	"Little Saint Nick"	Mike Love; Brian Wilson	Sugar Ray	2:07
6.	"I Won't Be Home for Christmas"	Mark Hoppus; Tom DeLonge; Scott Raynor	blink-182	3:16
7.	"My Christmas List"	Pierre Bouvier; Chuck Comeau; Sebastien Lefebvre	Simple Plan	3:27
8.	"The Christmas Song"	Rivers Cuomo	Weezer	3:07
9.	"Rock the Party (RTP Remix)"	Noah Bernardo; Marcos Curiel; Traa Daniels; Sonny Sandoval	P.O.D.	3:58
10.	"Better Do It Right"	Greg Camp	Smash Mouth	3:09
11.	"I Saw Mommy Kissing Santa Claus"	Tommie Connor	Bif Naked	2:54
12.	"Snowball"	Gerard Bradford; Jimmy Fallon	Jimmy Fallon	2:04
13.	"Red Letter Day"	Dow Brain; Rich Cronin; Brad Young	LFO	3:47
14.	"Christmas Wish"	Angela Via	Angela Via	4:07
15.	"Snow Angel"	T. Sullivan; M. Flannery	Little-T And One Track Mike	3:45
16.	"Christmas Canon"	Robert Kinkel; Paul O'Neill; Johann Pachelbeln	Trans-Siberian Orchestra	4:18
Total length:				55:36

== Credits and personnel ==
Credits adapted from AllMusic.

- Christina Aguilera – arranger, primary artist
- Ziad Al-Hillal – engineer
- Leroy Anderson – composer
- Howard Benson – producer
- blink-182 – performer, primary artist
- Pierre Bouvier – composer
- Gerard Bradford – composer
- Dow Brain – composer, producer
- Greg Camp – composer
- Chakdaddy – drum programming
- Greg Cham – session coordinator
- Chuck Comeau – composer
- Rich Cronin – composer
- Rivers Cuomo – composer
- Eric Dawkins – assistant engineer, vocals
- Dylan Dresdow – mixing
- Ron Fair – arranger, engineer, producer, strings
- Jimmy Fallon – composer, performer, primary artist
- Willa Ford – composer, primary artist, vocal arrangement
- Andrew Fromm – composer
- Brad Haehnel – engineer
- Tal Herzberg – programming
- Ashley Ingram – guitar, percussion, programming
- Ben Jelen – engineer
- Peter Karroll – mixing, producer
- Ok Hee Kim – assistant engineer
- Robert Kinkel – composer
- Arnold Lanni – engineer
- Sebastien Lefebvre – composer
- LFO – primary artist
- Little-T and One Track Mike – performer, primary artist
- Mike Love – composer
- Steve MacMillan – engineer
- Marcos – guitar
- Myron McKinley – organ
- Peter Mokran – mixing
- NSYNC – performer, primary artist
- Bif Naked – vocals, primary artist
- Eve Nelson – composer, drum programming, keyboard programming, mixing, producer
- Paul O'Neill – composer
- Organized Noize – producer
- P.O.D. – performer, primary artist
- Johann Pachelbel – composer
- Lisa Papineau – vocals (background)
- Mitchell Parish – composer
- Pebbles – producer
- Dave Pensado – mixing
- Veit Renn – producer
- Ricky Rodriguez – percussion
- Michael C. Ross – engineer
- Simple Plan – performer, primary artist
- Smash Mouth – performer, primary artist
- Sol Survivor – engineer
- Justin Stanley – producer
- Sugar Ray – performer, primary artist
- TLC – performer, primary artist
- Traditional – composer
- Trans-Siberian Orchestra – performer, primary artist
- Eric Valentine – engineer, mixing, producer
- John VanNest – engineer, producer
- Angela Via – performer, primary artist
- Weezer – performer, primary artist
- Brian Wilson – composer
- Carnie Wilson – vocals
- Wendy Wilson – vocals
- Dave Wittman – mixing engineer
- Terri Wong – assistant engineer
- Chris Wonzer – assistant engineer
- Wuv – drums
- Brad Young – composer, producer
- Yi-Huan Zhao – violin

== Charts ==
Chart (2001–02)	Peak position
US Billboard 200	162
US Holiday Album Sales (Billboard)	13

== Release history ==
Country	Date	Format	Label	Ref.
United States	October 30, 2001	cassette; CD	Atlantic, Lava	
