= Round Up (song) =

Single by Lady May featuring Blu Cantrell

from the album May Day and Bittersweet (International Edition)
- Released: December 29, 2002
- Recorded: 2001
- Genre: Country-rap; R&B
- Length: 4:14
- Label: Arista
- Songwriter(s): Jason Boyd, Kevin Ellis, Kym Holland, Ron Lawrence, Rhonda Robinson, Arthur Smith
- Producer(s): Kwame "K-1 Mill" Holland, Ron "AMEN-RA" Lawrence

Lady May singles chronology
"Round Up" (2002)	"A Toast to Men" (2003)

Blu Cantrell singles chronology
"Till I'm Gone" (2002)	"Round Up" (2002)	"Breathe" (2002)

"Round Up" is a song by American rapper Lady May, featuring American R&B singer Blu Cantrell. Released as a single in June 2002, the song was supposed to be the lead single from May's debut album, May Day, but the album has never been released. The single performed moderately in the U.S. urban market, peaking at number ninety-three on Billboard's Hot R&B/Hip-Hop Songs the week of July 27, 2002. "Round Up" never appeared on any albums except on non-U.S. pressings of Cantrell's second studio album, Bittersweet, released in 2003.

== Music video ==
The video, directed by Director X and shot in the Mojave Desert, is a remake of the 1991 road movie Thelma & Louise, and features May and Cantrell stealing money from a gas station, sleeping in a motel, running away from police, and driving a helicopter at the end of the video to escape from the local police.

== Track listing ==
U.S. 12" single

- Side A:
1. "Round Up" (Club Mix)
2. "Round Up" (Instrumental)
- Side B:
1. "Round Up" (Radio Mix)
2. "Round Up" (Acappella)

== Charts ==
Chart (2002)	Peak position
U.S. Billboard Hot R&B/Hip-Hop Songs	93
U.S. Billboard Rhythmic	27
