= So Blu =

Studio album by Blu Cantrell
- Released: July 31, 2001
- Length: 54:57
- Label: Arista
- Producers: Dallas Austin; Jimmy Jam and Terry Lewis; Olliewood & Scrilla; Jason Rome; Tricky Stewart; Don Vito; Big Jim Wright

Blu Cantrell chronology
So Blu (2001)	Bittersweet (2003)

Singles from So Blu
- 1. "Hit 'Em Up Style (Oops!)" Released: April 23, 2001; 2. "I'll Find a Way" Released: August 7, 2001; 3. "Till I'm Gone" Released: December 10, 2001

So Blu is the debut album by American recording artist Blu Cantrell. It was released by Arista Records on July 31, 2001 in the United States. The album was primarily produced by Tricky Stewart, who oversaw the majority of the recording sessions, with additional production from Dallas Austin, Jimmy Jam and Terry Lewis, Jason Rome, Don Vito, and Olliewood & Scrilla. Cantrell herself was actively involved in the creative process, serving as a co-writer on half of the tracks in the album's final tracklist.

The album was praised for Cantrell's powerful vocals and fresh take on contemporary R&B, though critics noted some conventional material and signs of a developing musical identity. It debuted at number eight on the US Billboard 200, selling 89,000 copies in its first week, and was certified gold in both the US and Canada, with domestic sales of over 600,000 copies. So Blu's lead single "Hit 'Em Up Style (Oops!)" became a top five hit in Australia, New Zealand and the United States.

== Background ==
In the late 1990s, Cantrell built early industry experience as a professional backing vocalist. In 1999, she became a member of the girl group 8th Avenue, mentored by producer Teddy Riley. Although the group recorded multiple songs, their momentum came to a halt after Riley's departure from Blackstreet, and with their material shelved, 8th Avenue soon disbanded. Following this setback, Cantrell was introduced to producer Tricky Stewart, while staying in Atlanta. Although Stewart initially considered her for his girl group 321, a productive studio session convinced him that Cantrell was better suited for a solo career. He began developing her as an individual artist, and she moved in with Stewart while working closely on her music.

Stewart soon arranged a meeting with Arista Records executive Antonio "L.A." Reid. After Cantrell performed a song she had written and sang it for Reid and his team, she was immediately offered a recording contract. A competitive bidding war among several labels followed, but Reid’s offer prevailed, leading Cantrell to sign with Arista Records and officially launch her solo career. Apart from Stweart, Reid arranged for her to co-wrote with other musicians on material for her debut album So Blu, including Dallas Austin, Jimmy Jam and Terry Lewis, and Big Jim Wright. Largely self-taught, Cantrell developed melodies organically and added lyrics as needed, without relying on prewritten material.

== Critical reception ==
Professional ratings
Review scores
Source	Rating
AllMusic	4.5/5 stars
Entertainment Weekly	B
Robert Christgau	(2-star Honorable Mention)
USA Today	3/4 stars
Yahoo! Music UK	7/10

AllMusic editor Stephen Thomas Erlewine called the album "a wonderfully fresh recasting of contemporary soul and R&B mores." He found that the material was "conventional, but it still sounds vibrant, thanks not just to Cantrell's impassioned vocals, but how the songs and productions are wrapped in contemporary mores but delivered as if they were classic. This is a record that maintains its momentum from beginning to end." James Salmon, writing for Yahoo! Music UK, felt that while "the album is good on the whole, it has to be said that "Hit 'Em Up Style" is one of the clear standouts. The remainder of the album sees the 25 year-old fit snugly into the traditional diva mould of the tragi-heroine who has loved and lost and, to put it bluntly, been shat on by from a great height by various members of the opposite sex."

Entertainment Weekly's Cheo Tyehimba wrote: "Bluesy but modern, Cantrell belts it out with the immediacy and energy of a hard-bop trumpet player. Although at times her flashy vocal stylings obscure the songs' emotional depth, this woman has a story to tell." People found that "most of the best songs on So Blu are torchy, gut-wrenching ballads [...] On these tracks the Providence-born chanteuse, whose mother was a jazz singer, really shines." The magazine found that Cantrell lacked "the vision of Jill Scott, Mary J. Blige or Erykah Badu, [but] the 25-year-old newcomer is clearly still searching for her musical identity on routine R&B numbers ]...] But at least the jazzy, introspective title tune seems to be so Cantrell." Robert Christgau described the album as "higher-res than Res, more songful than Mary" and cited "Swingin'" and "The One" as highlights. USA Today critic Steve Jones noted that So Blu showed that Cantrell "has got soul as well as the blues," with songs marked by heartbreak and revenge, while her "throaty, emotional vocals" allow her to "swing, seduce and carry a torch," making her a strong new signing.

== Commercial performance ==
So Blu debuted and peaked at number eight on the US Billboard 200 in the week ending August 18, 2001, with first week sales of 89,000 units. On August 31, 2001, the Recording Industry Association of America (RIAA) certified the album gold for shipments in excess of 500,000 copies. By January 2003, So Blu had sold 603,000 copies. The album was also certified gold by the Canadian Recording Industry Association (CRIA) in 2001, having sold more than 50,000 copies in Canada.

== Track listing ==
So Blu track listing
No.	Title	Writer(s)	Producer(s)	Length
1.	"Waste My Time" (featuring L.O.)	Tiffany Cobb; Christopher Stewart; Thabiso "Tab" Nkhereanye; Michael Franks; Rodney Richard	Tricky Stewart	3:45
2.	"Hit 'Em Up Style (Oops!)"	Dallas Austin	Austin	4:10
3.	"Till I'm Gone"	Cobb; Stewart; Tab	Stewart	4:21
4.	"U Must B Crazy"	DiAndre Davis; Orenthal Harper; Tab	Stewart	4:07
5.	"The One"	Cobb; Traci Hale; Jason Rome	Stewart; Rome	3:31
6.	"I'll Find a Way"	Cobb; James Wright; James Harris III; Terry Lewis	Jimmy Jam and Terry Lewis; Big Jim^{[A]}	5:15
7.	"Swingin'"	Austin; Wright; Harris; Lewis	Austin; Jam; Lewis	3:58
8.	"10,000 Times"	Ciara Princess Harris; Phillip Lane Stewart; Shamora Crawford	Olliewood & Scrilla	4:25
9.	"When I Needed You"	Cobb; Davis	Stewart	3:49
10.	"All You Had to Say"	Cobb; Davis; Harper; Tab	Stewart	4:22
11.	"I Can't Believe"	Stewart; Harper; Tab	Stewart	3:37
12.	"So Blu"	Richard; Hale; Stewart; Tab	Stewart; Don Vito	4:14
13.	"Blu Is a Mood"	Wright; Harris; Lewis	Jam; Lewis; Big Jim^{[A]}	5:23
Total length:				54:57

Japanese bonus track
No.	Title	Writer(s)	Producer(s)	Length
14.	"Hit 'Em Up Style (Oops!)" (Jazze Remix)	Austin	Austin; Pha^{[A]}	4:37

Notes

- ^{^[A]} denotes co-producer

== Charts ==
=== Weekly charts ===
Weekly chart performance for So Blu
Chart (2001)	Peak position
Australian Albums (ARIA)	87
Australian Urban Albums (ARIA)	13
Canadian Albums (Nielsen SoundScan)	15
US Billboard 200	8
US Top R&B/Hip-Hop Albums (Billboard)	5

=== Year-end charts ===
Year-end chart performance for So Blu
Chart (2001)	Position
Canadian Albums (Nielsen SoundScan)	126
Canadian R&B Albums (Nielsen SoundScan)	31
US Billboard 200	175
US Top R&B/Hip-Hop Albums (Billboard)	95

== Certifications ==
Certifications and sales for So Blu
Region	Certification	Certified units/sales
Canada (Music Canada)	Gold	50,000^{^}
United States (RIAA)	Gold	603,000
^{^} Shipments figures based on certification alone.

== Release history ==
So Blu release history
Region	Date	Format	Label
United States	July 31, 2001	Digital download; CD	Arista
Japan	October 3, 2001	Digital download; CD	Arista
United Kingdom	November 26, 2001	Digital download; CD	Arista
