= I Wanna Be Bad =

2001 single by Willa Ford

Single by Willa Ford featuring Royce da 5'9"

from the album Willa Was Here
- Released: April 24, 2001
- Studio: The Dojo (Jackson, New Jersey); Battery (New York City)
- Genre: Pop; dance-pop
- Length: 3:04
- Label: Lava; Atlantic
- Songwriters: Willa Ford; Brian Kierulf; Josh Schwartz
- Producers: Josh Schwartz; Brian Kierulf

Willa Ford singles chronology
"I Wanna Be Bad" (2001)	"Did Ya' Understand That" (2001)

Royce da 5'9" singles chronology
"You Can't Touch Me" (2000)	"I Wanna Be Bad" (2001)	"Rock City" (2002)

Music video
- "I Wanna Be Bad" on YouTube

"I Wanna Be Bad" is a song by American singer Willa Ford from her first studio album, Willa Was Here (2001). The song features a guest appearance from rapper Royce da 5'9". Ford wrote it alongside Brian Kierulf and Josh Schwartz, who both handled the production, when her record label, MCA Records, told her to tone down her music. Ford refused, deciding to create a track with a rebellious message. After Jason Flom of Lava Records heard the song, he signed Ford to the label and included it on Willa Was Here. Lava and Atlantic Records released the song as Ford's debut single and the lead one from the album on April 24, 2001. A pop and dance-pop track, it has Ford explaining that she wants to be a "bad girl" because her partner makes bad behavior look so good. The lyrics contain messages of rebellion and being oneself against the influences of other people.

Several music critics compared "I Wanna Be Bad" to songs by fellow American singer Britney Spears, whom Ford was trying not to imitate with her music. Immediately picked up by American radio stations, it reached number 22 on the US Billboard Hot 100, spent 20 weeks on the chart, and entered the top 20 on three other Billboard rankings. The song also charted in Australia, where it peaked at number 52. Ford has not had another hit single, making her a one-hit wonder. Ford promoted the song in several ways, including making a music video directed by Chris Applebaum, where she causes havoc at a club and on the streets. Because of the song's themes of nonconformity and comfort with oneself, the LGBTQ+ community has embraced it and turned Ford into an icon.

== Background and composition ==
"I Wanna Be Bad"
An 18-second sample of "I Wanna Be Bad". In this segment, Ford states that she wants to be bad because her partner acts badly as well.

Before recording "I Wanna Be Bad", Willa Ford, who was signed to MCA Records at the time, had already recorded nearly a full album's worth of songs. At that point, MCA Records requested her to make more "wholesome" compositions. Ford, 21 years old at the time, did not appreciate being told what to do with her music, so she decided to write a song depicting herself as a bad person, going against the label's wishes. Her associates, Brian Kierulf and Josh Schwartz, assisted with the songwriting. When Ford presented the new track to her label, the staff liked what she had done, but they wanted a less explicit pre-chorus. However, when Lava Records president Jason Flom and Atlantic Records director Andy Shane heard the song, they decided to sign Ford to the labels and release the song, appreciating that she wrote her own material. Ford recorded the track at The Dojo in Jackson, New Jersey, and Battery Studios in New York City, and she arranged all the vocals. Kierulf plays all the instruments while Schwartz provides additional guitar, and both men produced the track.

Musically, "I Wanna Be Bad" is a pop and dance-pop song. The track's lyrics are, according to Ford, "about a girl coming into her own and becoming a woman", and she considers it her song of freedom. The opening lyrics are autotuned, with Ford saying that she wants to be bad. Her love interest prefers to behave badly, so she decides to act rebellious along with him since he does it well. The single version of the song features Royce da 5'9", while the album version has Ford singing alone, with the rap replaced by more vocoder lines; both versions of the track are three minutes and four seconds long. In a 2017 interview with Billboard, Ford stated that although she did not dislike popstars such as Britney Spears and Jessica Simpson, she was not this type of person and wanted to let people know this fact with "I Wanna Be Bad".

== Release and promotion ==
A screenshot from the song's music video. In this scene, Ford (center right) flirts with police officers while eating a doughnut. She eventually puts the officers in the backseat and commandeers their cruiser.

On April 24, 2001, Atlantic and Lava Records serviced "I Wanna Be Bad" to American contemporary hit radio (CHR) and rhythmic contemporary radio stations, as Ford wanted her debut single to "push the envelope". Radio stations enthusiastically picked up the song, appreciating the divergence from the generic mainstream pop music sound of the time, and it was the third-most-added track at CHR radio for the week of April 27. The song was then released as a CD single in the United States on May 22, 2001, and a maxi-CD was released the same year. In Australia, the track was distributed as a CD single on August 20, 2001. The song was later included as the opening track on Ford's debut studio album, Willa Was Here, which was issued in the US on July 17, 2001. Most attention to the song came from backlash after Ford ended her relationship with Backstreet Boys member Nick Carter, resulting in the creation of many websites criticizing her and the breakup. Although Ford has said that these websites initially upset her, she used the situation to her advantage to help draw attention to the song and her career.

A music video directed by Chris Applebaum was made to promote the song. In the video, Ford portrays an ill-mannered woman who flirts with a DJ at a club, seduces police officers while eating doughnuts, and steals their cruiser while they sit in the backseat. Interspersed throughout the video are clips of Ford performing with her backup dancers and Royce da 5'9"; near the end of the video, she performs alongside two pole dancers as bubbles float around her. The video received significant airplay on American television program Total Request Live (TRL). In the booklet for Willa Was Here, there is a hyperlink that leads to the video. In February 2001, Ford called the video "off the hook", but retrospectively, she said that the video was one of her reasons for distancing herself from interviews, explaining that people misinterpreted the theme and believed she was "'the hot chick,' 'the badass' or 'the bitch'" rather than a rebellious woman. Ford also promoted the song by performing it live at the Pantene Pro-Voice 2001 concert, and it was used in an advertising campaign for Six Flags amusement park.

== Reception and legacy ==
Chuck Taylor of Billboard compared "I Wanna Be Bad" to works by fellow pop singer Britney Spears, citing the "cutesy sing-along chorus" and the ribald lyrical content. Christopher Rosa, writing for Glamour, called the song a "stomping pop anthem" that made other suggestive songs such as Spears' "I'm a Slave 4 U" and Christina Aguilera's "Dirrty" seem modest. AllMusic reviewer Stephen Thomas Erlewine called the song "catchy" with "post-Britney, Max Martin flair" and noted how it is the only track on the album that is not "startlingly crass". JEDowney from Earbuddy wrote that the song was one of the three better tracks from the album and compared it to a disappointing Spears song.

Due to the song's message of rebellion, "I Wanna Be Bad" has resounded with some of the LGBTQ+ community and turned Ford into an icon. Ford said that she believed the community responded because her song is honest in its "I'm trying to figure out who I am" message, giving people the confidence to go out at night and be themselves without acknowledging other people's judgements. In 2026, the song played in a Calvin Klein campaign video titled "Feel the Fit", which stars American actress Sadie Sink.

=== Commercial performance ===
"I Wanna Be Bad" debuted at number 92 on the US Billboard Hot 100 on June 9, 2001. It entered the top 40 of the chart on July 7, 2001, and rose to a peak of number 22 four weeks later, on August 4. The song spent a total of 20 weeks on the Hot 100 and ranked in at number 84 on the chart's year-end edition. It was a top-five hit on the Billboard Maxi-Singles Sales chart, peaking at number four in September 2001, and entered the top 20 on the Billboard Mainstream Top 40 and Top 40 Tracks rankings, reaching numbers 11 and 19, respectively. As of 2007, the song has sold 250,000 copies in the US. Elsewhere, "I Wanna Be Bad charted on Australia's ARIA Singles Chart, reaching number 52 on the week of September 17, 2001. Ford's following hit, "Did Ya' Understand That", did not experience success due to being released on September 11, 2001, and she has since become a one-hit wonder.

== Track listings ==
US and UK CD single

1. "I Wanna Be Bad" – 3:04
2. "I Wanna Be Bad" (with rap and vocoder featuring Royce da 5'9") – 3:04
3. "I Wanna Be Bad" (video)

US maxi-CD single

1. "I Wanna Be Bad" (Mike Rizzo club mix) – 6:39
2. "I Wanna Be Bad" (Sal "Parm" slub mix) – 9:14
3. "I Wanna Be Bad" (Mike Rizzo Hyper vocal mix) – 6:09
4. "I Wanna Be Bad" (Sal "Parm" dub) – 7:14
5. "I Wanna Be Bad" (Sal "Parm" radio edit) – 3:59

Australian CD single

1. "I Wanna Be Bad" (no rap version) – 3:04
2. "I Wanna Be Bad" (album version with rap and vocoder) – 3:04
3. "I Wanna Be Bad" (Plasmic Honey edit) – 3:59
4. "I Wanna Be Bad" (Mike Rizzo radio edit) – 3:36
5. "I Wanna Be Bad" (Plasmic Honey club mix) – 9:55
6. "I Wanna Be Bad" (Mike Rizzo club mix) – 6:39

== Credits and personnel ==
Credits are lifted from the US CD singles liner notes and the Willa Was Here booklet.

Recording

- Recorded at The Dojo (Jackson, New Jersey) and Battery Studios (New York City)
- Mixed at the Mix Room (Burbank, California)
- Mastered at Sterling Sound (New York City)

Personnel

- Willa Ford – writing, all vocals and vocal arrangements
- Brian Kierulf – writing, instruments, programming, production, recording (Dojo)
- Josh Schwartz – writing, additional guitar, production, recording (Dojo)
- Royce da 5'9" – featured vocals
- Stephen George – recording (Battery)
- Rob Chiarelli – mixing
- Tom Coyne – mastering

== Charts ==
=== Weekly charts ===
Weekly chart performance for "I Wanna Be Bad"
Chart (2001)	Peak position
Australia (ARIA)	52
Canada CHR (Nielsen BDS)	19
US Billboard Hot 100	22
US Dance Singles Sales (Billboard)	4
US Pop Airplay (Billboard)	11
US Top 40 Tracks (Billboard)	19

=== Year-end charts ===
Year-end chart performance for "I Wanna Be Bad"
Chart (2001)	Position
US Billboard Hot 100	84
US Mainstream Top 40 (Billboard)	52

== Release history ==
Release dates and formats for "I Wanna Be Bad"
Region	Date	Format(s)	Label(s)	ID	Ref(s).
United States	April 24, 2001	Rhythmic contemporary; contemporary hit radio	Lava; Atlantic	—N/a	
United States	May 22, 2001	CD	Lava; Atlantic	85103-2	
United States	2001	Maxi-CD	Lava; Atlantic	85146-2	
Australia	August 20, 2001	CD	Lava; Atlantic	7567-85136-2	
