= Lady May (rapper) =

American rapper, singer and songwriter (Rhonda Natasha Robinson; born 1974)

- Also known as: Mae West, May
- Born: Rhonda Natasha Robinson; March 6, 1974 (age 52)
- Origin: Long Island, New York, U.S.
- Genres: Hip hop
- Occupations: Rapper, singer, songwriter
- Years active: 1998–2008
- Labels: Crazy Cat, Arista

Rhonda Natasha Robinson (born March 6, 1974), known professionally as Lady May, is an American rapper, singer and songwriter from Long Island, New York's suburbs.

== Early life ==
May is African-American and partly of Asian descent. She grew up listening to Elton John, Duran Duran and Michael Jackson. At the age of fifteen, May stopped attending high school and became a hip hop dancer in music videos for artists such as LL Cool J and Jodeci, but was left unsatisfied, eventually turning to rap music. She danced with Big Lez and became an accountant for Trackmasters.

== Career ==
She began rapping in the late 1990s under her stage name, Mae West; her rapping skills would eventually gain notice from fellow producer/rapper, Deric "D-Dot" Angelettie, who introduced her via his 2000 solo debut album, Tell 'Em Why U Madd, on the track "Shysty Broads" alongside former Timbaland protégé, Babe Blue. He later renamed her, Lady May, introduced her to Crazy Cat Productions and she eventually landed a contract deal with Arista Records in 2001.

May released her debut single in 2002, "Round Up", which featured R&B singer and former label-mate Blu Cantrell it had got slowly rotation on the radio and her and Cantrell performed it together on Soul Train. Her following planned single was "Dick & Doe"; a music video for the song was shot but in the midst of the pushbacks for May Day (first scheduled for a release in May 2002, then to July 16, 2002, then August 2002), the single and video as well as the album were altogether shelved after the poor reception gained from "Round Up" - the album eventually leaked onto P2P sites. She was also featured on former label-mate Rob Jackson's 2002 single "Boom Boom Boom", which was slated to appear on his debut album, For the People, but was eventually shelved as well. In 2003, she was featured on Willa Ford's "A Toast to Men", also appearing in its video.

The same year she appeared on DJ Kayslay's Streetsweeper Vol. 1 on the song "Seven Deadly Sins", which also featured Vita, Angie Martinez, Duchess, Amil, Sonja Blade, and Remy Ma.

May contributed on Jennifer Lopez's 2007 Brave album credited as a songwriter on several tracks.

May Day was ultimately released online on all platforms on August 30, 2023, nearly 21 years after it was ultimately shelved. It contains a few more interludes that were not present on the tracklist of the initial promotional copies that circulated physically.

== Discography ==
=== Singles ===
Year	Single	Chart positions		Album
Year	Single	U.S. R&B	U.S. dance sales	Album
2002	"Round Up" (featuring Blu Cantrell)	93	—	May Day
2002	"The Dick & The Dough"	—	—	May Day
2003	"A Toast to Men" (Willa Ford featuring Lady May)	—	11	SexySexObsessive

=== Album appearances ===
Year	Song	Album
2000	Shysty Broads (The Madd Rapper with Mae West, Babe Blue, Erika Kaine & Mashonda)	Tell 'Em Why U Madd
2001	Smash On The First Night (G. Dep feat. May)	Child of the Ghetto
2001	Get The Party Started (Pink feat. Lady May)	Get The Party Started (Remixes) - Single
2002	Put Me Down (Rap Version & Remix) (Donell Jones feat. Lady May & Styles P)	Put Me Down - Single
2002	Get Into Something (Remix) (Jené feat. Lady May & Foxy Brown)	Get Into Something (Remix) - Single
2003	Seven Deadly Sins (DJ Kay Slay (feat. Lady May, Amil, Angie Martinez, Vita, Duchess, Sonja Blade, Remy Martin	The Streetsweeper Vol. 1
2004	If You So Gangsta (Lloyd Banks (feat. May)	The Hunger For More
2007	Say Hello (Jay-Z) (background vocals)	American Gangster

== Filmography ==
Year	Title	Role
2002	Soul Train	Herself
2003	Anne B. Real	Fendi
2004	Up Against the 8 Ball	Fina
2007	Smack DVD Magazine	Herself
