= Blu Cantrell =

American R&B and soul singer (born 1976)

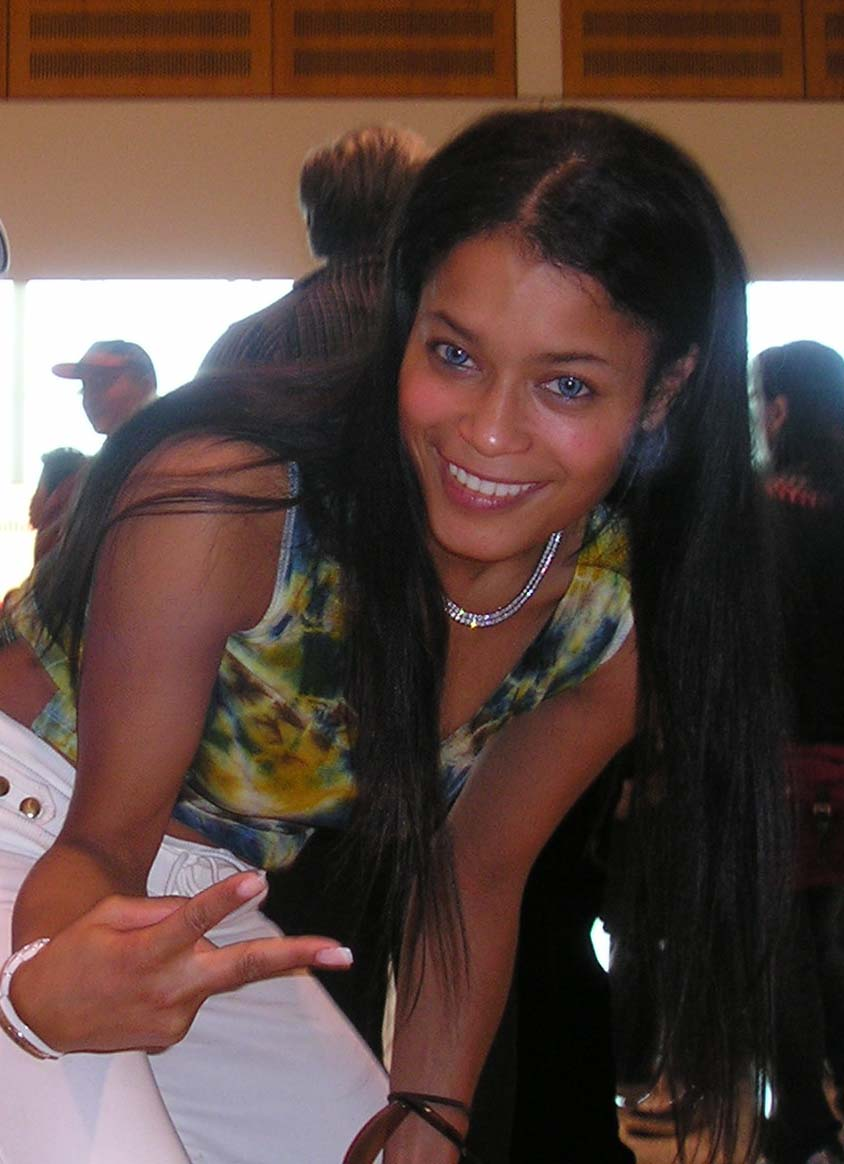
- Cantrell in 2008

Background information
- Born: Tiffany Cobb; March 16, 1976 (age 50); Providence, Rhode Island, U.S.
- Genres: R&B; soul
- Occupations: Singer; songwriter
- Years active: 1997–present
- Label: Arista
- Website: blucantrell.me

Tiffany Cobb (born March 16, 1976), known professionally as Blu Cantrell, is an American R&B and soul singer.

Cantrell rose to fame in 2001, with the release of her debut single, "Hit 'Em Up Style (Oops!)", which peaked at number two on the US Billboard Hot 100 and topped the US Mainstream Top 40 chart. The song also charted in several other countries, and appeared on her debut album, So Blu. In 2002, the song earned Cantrell a Grammy Award nomination. In 2003, Cantrell released her second album, Bittersweet, which was nominated for a Grammy Award and included the single "Breathe" (featuring Sean Paul). Written and produced by Ivan Matias, "Breathe" was a major global success in 2003, especially in the United Kingdom, where it topped the UK Singles Chart for four consecutive weeks. "Breathe" also reached the top ten of several other charts across the world, including the European Hot 100.

Blu Cantrell has cited a wide range of artists as influences, including Billie Holiday, Sade, Kim Burrell, Karen Clark, Vanessa Bell Armstrong, Sting, Prince, Aretha Franklin, and Whitney Houston.

== Early life ==
Cantrell was born Tiffany Cobb in Providence, Rhode Island. Her mother, former beauty queen Susi Franco, was an actress and jazz vocalist. According to Cantrell, she has African-American, German, and Italian ancestry. Cantrell's parents separated when she was a child, and she and her five siblings were raised by her mother.

== Career ==
=== Early career ===
In the late 1990s, Cantrell established herself as a professional backing vocalist for artists such as Sean "Puffy" Combs. In 1999, she became a member of the girl group 8th Avenue, a protégé of singer Teddy Riley. The band recorded several songs and appeared on Blackstreet's 1999 album Finally, but their material was shelved after Riley left Blackstreet to reform his previous group Guy, and Blackstreet were dropped by Interscope Records. Shortly thereafter, 8th Avenue also disbanded.

Before long, Cantrell was introduced by both a dancer friend and R&B singer Usher to music producer Tricky Stewart, the head of Red Zone Entertainment. Stewart originally wanted Cantrell to become a member of his girl group 321, but after a fruitful recording session, he offered to help develop Cantrell's solo career instead. Cantrell subsequently moved in with Stewart and his girlfriend in their house in Atlanta, and was promptly placed with Arista Records head Antonio "L.A." Reid, who offered the singer a contract with the company after hearing one song she wrote and sang in front of him and his staff. After a bidding war with several different labels, Reid's bid was the highest, prompting Cantrell to sign with them.

=== 2001–2004: So Blu and Bittersweet ===
After her signing with Arista, Cantrell went straight into recording sessions with Dallas Austin and Stewart, as well as Jimmy Jam and Terry Lewis. In July 2001, her debut album, So Blu, was released. The record earned generally favorable reviews from critics and became a commercial success, particularly in North America, where it peaked at number eight on the US Billboard 200. It was eventually certified gold by both the Recording Industry Association of America (RIAA) and Music Canada. The album's lead single "Hit 'Em Up Style (Oops!)" became a top ten hit in Australia, Canada, New Zealand, and the Netherlands and peaked at number two on the US Billboard Hot 100. The song earned Cantrell Grammy Award nominations for Best Female R&B Vocal Performance and for Best R&B Song, as well as an American Music Award nomination for Favorite New Soul/R&B Artist, both in 2002. Also in 2002, Cantrell was featured in a small cameo role in Charles Stone III's musical comedy-drama film Drumline, where she could be seen singing the American national anthem. Her song "It's Killing Me (In My Mind)" was included on the soundtrack of the 2002 action comedy film Bad Company.

In 2003, Cantrell released her second album, Bittersweet which featured production from Kevin "She'kspere" Briggs, Mike City, Soulshock & Karlin, and Shep Crawford. As with her debut, the album garnered a positive reception from critics, even earning her a Best R&B Album nomination at the 46th Grammy Awards, but was less successful in the United States, peaking at number 37 on the Billboard 200. The album was a success internationally, where sales were boosted by its hit single "Breathe", a collaboration with Sean Paul. Her highest-charting single yet, it topped the charts in Ireland, Romania, and the United Kingdom, and reached the top ten of the majority of charts it appeared on, ranking among the biggest-selling releases of the year. "Breathe" was followed by the top thirty single "Make Me Wanna Scream".

=== 2005–present ===
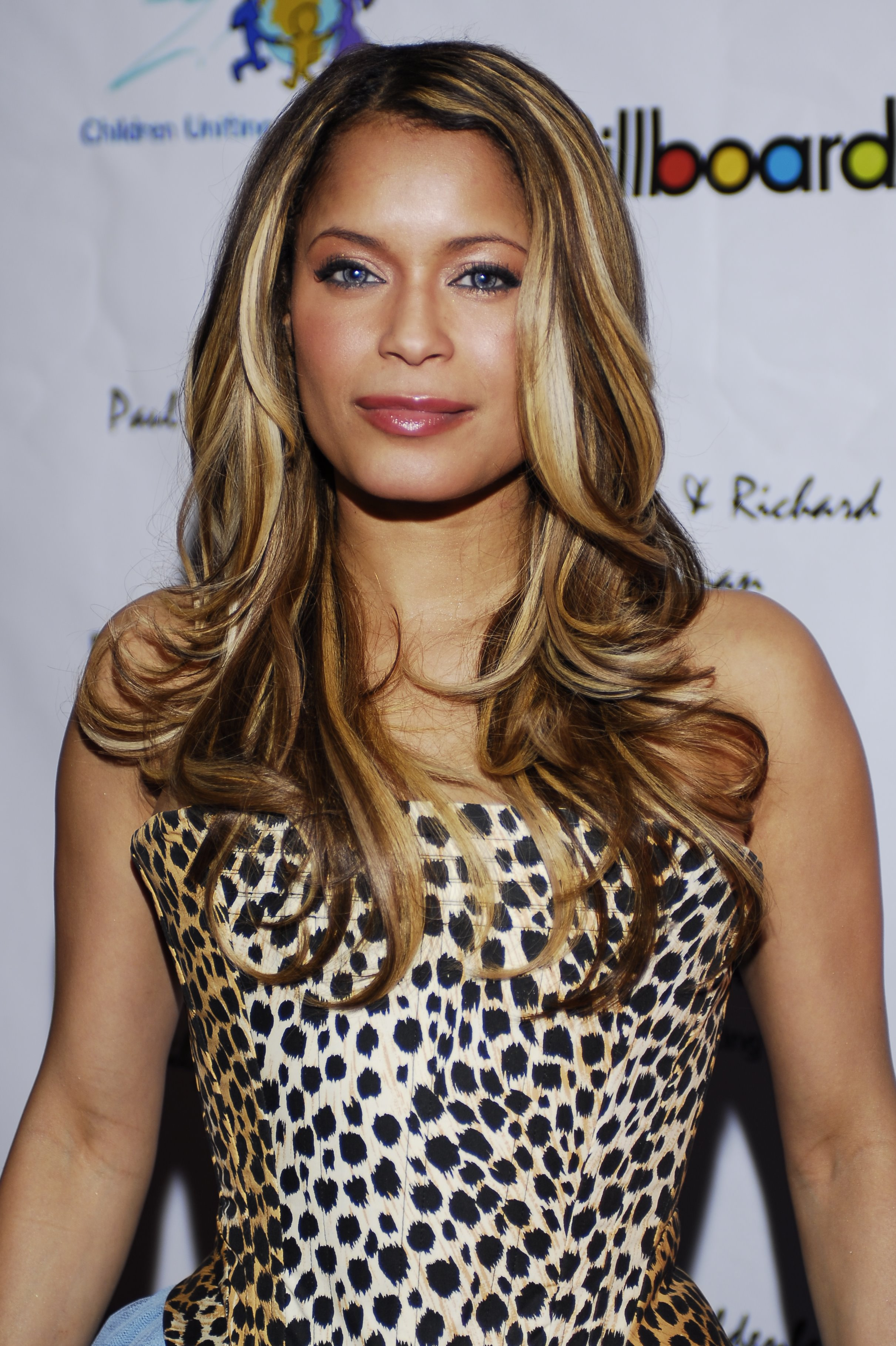
Cantrell in 2007

In 2005, following the formation of the joint venture of BMG and Sony Music Entertainment, Arista merged with J Records and began operating under the newly formed RCA Music Group. At about the same time, Cantrell's recording deal was up for renewal and though she was in a position to re-sign with the label, the singer chose to leave the company following the resignation of her mentor L.A. Reid. She then toured intensively as a free agent. Cantrell also starred alongside LisaRaye and Kenya Moore in the musical stage play Gossip, Lies and Secrets which ran from September until November in 2007. The following year, she appeared in NBC's Celebrity Circus, becoming the first celebrity to be eliminated from the show in the season's second week.

In 2013, Cantrell confirmed that she was working independently on her third studio album. In December 2016, she told Fuse that she was still working on a new album.

Despite the lack of US success after her one big hit, Cantrell continues to perform in Australia and Europe.

== Personal life ==
Cantrell was taken into custody by police for a psychological evaluation on September 3, 2014. She was seen running around the streets of Santa Monica at around 2 am, screaming that someone had "poisoned her with gas". When her "erratic" behavior failed to cease, she was taken to a nearby hospital, where she was evaluated by medics.

== Discography ==
- So Blu (2001)
- Bittersweet (2003)

== Filmography ==
Year	Title	Role	Notes
2002	Drumline	Girl singing American National Anthem	Cameo

== Awards and nominations ==
=== American Music Awards ===
Year	Nominated work	Award	Result
2002	Herself	Favorite Soul/R&B New Artist	Nominated

=== Grammy Awards ===
Year	Nominated work	Award	Result
2002	"Hit 'Em Up Style (Oops!)"	Best Female R&B Vocal Performance	Nominated
2004	Bittersweet	Best R&B Album	Nominated
