= Hit 'Em Up Style (Oops!) =

2001 single by Blu Cantrell

Single by Blu Cantrell

from the album So Blu
- Released: April 23, 2001
- Studio: D.A.R.P. (Atlanta, Georgia)
- Length: 4:10
- Label: Arista
- Songwriter: Dallas Austin
- Producer: Dallas Austin

Blu Cantrell singles chronology
"Hit 'Em Up Style (Oops!)" (2001)	"I'll Find a Way" (2001)

"Hit 'Em Up Style (Oops!)" is a song by American R&B and soul singer Blu Cantrell, written and produced by Dallas Austin and included on Cantrell's debut album, So Blu (2001). The song was released in the United States on April 23, 2001, as Cantrell's debut single. It is her most successful single in the US and her only single to enter the top 40 of the Billboard Hot 100 chart, peaking at number two for two weeks in July 2001. It experienced similar success worldwide, becoming a top-10 hit in Australia, Canada, the Netherlands, and New Zealand. Cantrell received a Grammy nomination for Best Female R&B Performance for the single.

== Composition ==
The lyrics propose that women should take revenge on cheating men by draining them of their available assets, both monetary assets and property. Cantrell has said that she did not particularly care for the song artistically, but the bitter feelings she was experiencing at the time led her to include it on the album anyway. "Hit 'Em Up Style (Oops!)" takes a small snippet sample from Frank Sinatra’s "Boys' Night Out". The song is written in the key of F minor and is written in half time with a tempo of 90 beats per minute. The song features the chords Fm and B♭m6, and Cantrell's vocals span from B♭_{3} to A♭_{5}.

== Track listings ==
The snippets from So Blu consist of "Till I'm Gone" (1:01), "I'll Find a Way" (1:03), "The One" (1:09), "U Must B Crazy" (0:59), and "Waste My Time" featuring L.O. (1:08)

US CD single

1. "Hit 'Em Up Style (Oops!)" (radio mix) – 4:02
2. "Hit 'Em Up Style (Oops!)" (instrumental) – 4:12
3. Snippets from So Blu

US 12-inch single

A1. "Hit 'Em Up Style (Oops!)" (radio mix) – 4:12
A2. "Hit 'Em Up Style (Oops!)" (instrumental) – 4:11
B1. "Hit 'Em Up Style (Oops!)" (radio mix) – 4:12
B2. "Hit 'Em Up Style (Oops!)" (a cappella) – 4:01

UK CD single

1. "Hit 'Em Up Style (Oops!)" (radio mix) – 4:02
2. "Hit 'Em Up Style (Oops!)" (remix featuring Foxy Brown) – 3:34
3. "Hit 'Em Up Style (Oops!)" (remix featuring Jazze Pha and L.O.) – 4:36

UK 12-inch single

A1. "Hit 'Em Up Style (Oops!)" (radio mix)
B1. "Hit 'Em Up Style (Oops!)" (remix)
B2. "Hit 'Em Up Style (Oops!)" (instrumental)

UK cassette single and European CD single

1. "Hit 'Em Up Style (Oops!)" (radio mix) – 4:02
2. "Hit 'Em Up Style (Oops!)" (remix featuring Foxy Brown) – 3:34 (4:12 in Europe)

Australian maxi-CD single

1. "Hit 'Em Up Style (Oops!)" (album version radio edit) – 4:02
2. "Hit 'Em Up Style (Oops!)" (remix featuring Foxy Brown) – 4:12
3. "Hit 'Em Up Style (Oops!)" (remix featuring Jazze Pha and L.O.) – 4:38
4. "Hit 'Em Up Style (Oops!)" (album version instrumental) – 4:12

== Credits and personnel ==
Credits are adapted from the US CD single liner notes.

Studios

- Recorded at D.A.R.P. Studios (Atlanta, Georgia)
- Mixed at Larrabee North Studios (Hollywood, California)

Personnel

- Blu Cantrell – vocals, background vocals
- Dallas Austin – writing, bass, keyboards, production
- Kimberly Smith – production coordination
- Carlton Lynn – recording
- Doug Harms – recording assistance
- Kevin "KD" Davis – mixing
- Rick Sheppard – MIDI and sound design
- Antonio "LA" Reid – executive production
- C. "Tricky" Stewart – executive production
- Tab Nkhereanye – co-executive production
- gravillis inc. – design
- Kwaku Alston – photography

== Charts ==
=== Weekly charts ===
Chart (2001–2002)	Peak position
Australia (ARIA)	3
Australian Urban (ARIA)	1
Belgium (Ultratop 50 Flanders)	46
Belgium (Ultratip Bubbling Under Wallonia)	12
Canada (Nielsen SoundScan)	7
Canada CHR (Nielsen BDS)	1
Denmark (Tracklisten)	16
Europe (Eurochart Hot 100)	33
France (SNEP)	47
Germany (GfK)	60
Hungary (Rádiós Top 40)	19
Ireland (IRMA)	37
Italy (FIMI)	26
Netherlands (Dutch Top 40)	8
Netherlands (Single Top 100)	10
New Zealand (Recorded Music NZ)	3
Norway (VG-lista)	12
Scottish Singles Sales (Official Charts)	19
Sweden (Sverigetopplistan)	35
Switzerland (Schweizer Hitparade)	77
UK Singles (Official Charts)	12
UK Dance (Official Charts)	7
UK Indie (Official Charts)	21
UK Hip Hop/R&B (Official Charts)	8
US Billboard Hot 100	2
US Hot R&B/Hip-Hop Songs (Billboard)	6
US Pop Airplay (Billboard)	1
US Rhythmic Airplay (Billboard)	5

=== Year-end charts ===
Chart (2001)	Position
Australia (ARIA)	54
Canada (Nielsen SoundScan)	82
Canada Radio (Nielsen BDS)	32
Netherlands (Dutch Top 40)	59
Netherlands (Single Top 100)	97
New Zealand (RIANZ)	23
UK Urban (Music Week)	38
US Billboard Hot 100	11
US Hot R&B/Hip-Hop Singles & Tracks (Billboard)	59
US Mainstream Top 40 (Billboard)	10
US Rhythmic Top 40 (Billboard)	18

== Certifications ==
Region	Certification	Certified units/sales
Australia (ARIA)	Gold	35,000^{^}
New Zealand (RMNZ)	2× Platinum	60,000^{‡}
United Kingdom (BPI)	Gold	400,000^{‡}
^{^} Shipments figures based on certification alone.^{‡} Sales+streaming figures based on certification alone.

== Release history ==
Region	Date	Format(s)	Label(s)	Ref(s).
United States	April 23, 2001	Radio	Arista	
Europe	September 1, 2001	CD	Arista	
Denmark	September 3, 2001	CD	Arista	
Finland	September 3, 2001	CD	Arista	
Australia	September 17, 2001	CD	Arista	
United Kingdom	November 12, 2001	12-inch vinyl; CD; cassette	Arista	
