= LeToya Luckett discography =

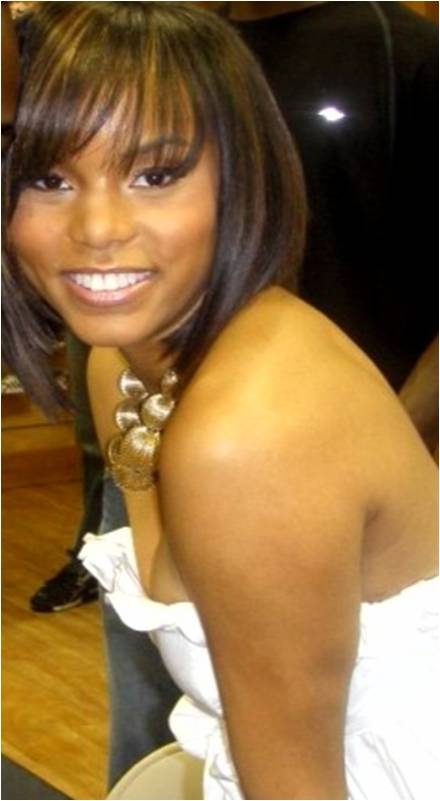
- Luckett in 2009
- Studio albums: 3
- Soundtrack albums: 5
- Singles: 16
- Music videos: 10

The discography of LeToya Luckett, an American R&B singer-songwriter consists of three studio albums, sixteen singles, seven promotional singles and ten music videos.

LeToya debuted at number one on the U.S. Billboard 200 with first week sales of 165,000 copies and at number one on the Billboard Top R&B/Hip-Hop Albums chart, becoming the second Destiny's Child member to reach that position on SoundScan Mainstream Chart as a solo artist. To date, the album has sold over 529,000 copies according to Nielsen Soundscan, and has been certified Platinum by the RIAA for shipping over a million copies. The first single from the album was "You Got What I Need", with non-commercial purpose, but "All Eyes on Me", the second single, is claimed as her "original" first single, as this is the first track that showcased her as a solo artist. "Torn", the first official single from the album which was released in March 2006 and soon became a hit having a high airplay, just missing out the top thirty on the U.S. Billboard Hot 100 charts at number thirty one, nevertheless still becoming a top 40 hit. "Torn" became a hit on the U.S. Hot R&B/Hip-Hop Songs, peaking at number two. It also entered the top twenty on the Rhythmic Top 40 and Adult R&B charts. In the same year, the song was finally released worldwide, namely the United Kingdom, New Zealand, and Australia and became a moderate worldwide hit.

In the U.S., Lady Love opened with first week sales of 32,900 copies, debuting at the top of the Billboard Top R&B/Hip-Hop Albums chart, replacing Ledisi's Turn Me Loose, on September 12, 2009, where it spent a total of thirty-two weeks and number twelve on the Billboard 200, where it spent a total of twelve weeks. Though fairly successful commercially, the album failed to match or better the sales or chart performance of its predecessor and did not chart outside of the United States. As of April 2010, the album has sold 132,000 copies to date. "Not Anymore", the lead single, was released in February 2009, and peaked at number eighteen on US Billboard Hot R&B/Hip-Hop Songs "She Ain't Got..." the album's second single, peaking at number thirty-nine on the Billboard Rhythmic Top 40 chart, while peaking at number seventy-five on the Billboard Pop 100 Airplay chart and number twenty on the Billboard Hot Dance Club Play. However, the single was most successful in Japan where it peaked at number forty-nine on the Japan Hot 100. "Regret", featuring rapper Ludacris, was released as the third single – based only on downloads and airplay – "Regret" peaked at number eight on the US Billboard Hot R&B/Hip-Hop Songs chart and debuted at number one-hundred on the Billboard Hot 100, peaking at number seventy-eight. "Good to Me", was released on February 11, 2010.

== Albums ==
=== Studio albums ===
List of albums, with selected chart positions
Title	Album details	Peak chart positions						Certifications
Title	Album details	US	US R&B /HH	US Indie	CAN	JPN	UK R&B	Certifications
LeToya	Released: July 4, 2006; Format: CD, digital download; Label: Capitol	1	1	—	66	37	39	RIAA: Platinum
Lady Love	Released: August 24, 2009; Format: CD, digital download; Label: Capitol	12	1	—	—	54	—	
Back 2 Life	Released: May 12, 2017; Format: CD, digital download; Label: eOne	91	44	4	—	—	—	

== Singles ==
=== As a lead artist ===
List of singles, with selected chart positions
Title	Year	Peak chart positions								Album
Title	Year	US	US R&B /HH	US Adult R&B	US Dance	AUS	JPN	NZ	UK	Album
"Torn"	2006	31	2	17	35	44	—	28	35	LeToya
"She Don't"	2006	— (Note: "She Don't" did not enter US Billboard Hot 100, but peaked at number 2 on the US Bubbling Under Hot 100 chart.)	17	35	—	—	—	—	—	LeToya
"Obvious"	2006	—	— (Note: "Obvious" did not enter US Billboard Hot R&B/Hip-Hop Songs chart, but peaked at number 2 on the US Bubbling Under Hot R&B/Hip-Hop Songs chart.)	—	—	—	—	—	—	LeToya
"Not Anymore"	2009	— (Note: "Not Anymore" did not enter US Billboard Hot 100, but peaked at number 7 on the US Bubbling Under Hot 100 chart.)	18	40	—	—	—	—	—	Lady Love
"She Ain't Got..."	2009	—	—	—	20	—	49	—	—	Lady Love
"Regret" (featuring Ludacris)	2009	78	8	34	—	—	—	—	—	Lady Love
"Good to Me"	2010	—	—	—	—	—	—	—	—	Lady Love
"Back 2 Life"	2016	—	—	6	—	—	—	—	—	Back 2 Life
"Used To"	2017	—	—	—	—	—	—	—	—	Back 2 Life
"In the Name"	2017	—	—	—	—	—	—	—	—	Back 2 Life
"Feeling"	2019	—	—	—	—	—	—	—	—	Non-album singles
"Love on Christmas"	2019	—	—	—	—	—	—	—	—	Non-album singles

=== As a featured artist ===
Title	Year	US R&B /HH	Album
"Almost Made Ya" (with Ali & Gipp)	2007	—	Kinfolk
"I Miss You" (with Webbie)	2008	64	Savage Life 2
"Love Rollercoaster" (with Mims)	2009	78	Guilt / Lady Love
"When I Had the Chance" (with Boney James)	2011	98	Contact

=== Promotional singles ===
Title	Year	Album
"U Got What I Need"	2004	LeToya
"All Eyes on Me"	2005	LeToya
"No More"	2006	LeToya
"Don't Make Me Wait"	2014	Non-album single
"I'm Ready"	2017	Back 2 Life
"Grey" (featuring Ludacris)	2017	Back 2 Life

== Other appearances ==
=== Album appearances ===
Title	Year	Album	Artist
"Can't Stop"¹	1997	Blood Money	Lil' O
"Just Be Straight with Me"¹	1998	Charge It 2 da Game	Silkk Tha Shocker
"She's Gone"¹	1998	Say Who	Matthew Marsden
"Woman in Me"¹	1999	Sweet Kisses	Jessica Simpson
"Baby, Baby, Baby"¹	1999	Visions (Shelved)	Kobe Bryant
"Good to Me"¹	2000	Thankful	Mary Mary
"Thug Love"¹	2000	Power of the Dollar (Shelved)	50 Cent
"Do It Again"	2000	S.D.E.	Cam'ron, Jim Jones
"My Promise"	2004	It's Already Written	Houston
"This Is My Life"	2005	Already Platinum	Slim Thug
"Pushin' Remix"	2006	B-side	Bun B, Lil Keke & Cory Mo
"Work That"	2006	Take It or Leave It	Young Collage
"Without You"	2007	Music Is My Savior	Mims
"Almost Made Ya'"	2007	Kinfolk'	Ali & Gipp
"G-Love (U Don't Love Me)"	2007	Back to the Trap House	Gucci Mane
"I Miss You"	2008	Savage Life 2	Webbie
"Diddy Rock (Remix)" (Unreleased)	2008	We Invented the Remix Vol. 2 (Shelved)	Diddy, Twista, Timbaland & Shawnna
"Hark! The Herald Angels Sing"	2008	NBC Sounds of the Season – The Holiday Collection	Nat King Cole
"Love Rollercoaster"	2009	Guilt	Mims
"P.O.V."	2009	Mr. Robinson's Neighborhood	Yung Joc
"Be with You"	2009	Pain Medicine	Max Minelli
"All a Dream"	2010	Trill OG	Bun B
"Single"	2010	The Testimony (Mixtape)	J. Valentine
"She Likes"	2010	Pleasure Principles	Pleasure P
"I Do"	2012	Love & Other Drugs	J. Valentine
"You on You"	2015	Against All Odds	Propain
Note: 1. with Destiny's Child.

=== Soundtrack appearances ===
Title	Year	Movie	Label
"Killing Time"¹	1997	Men in Black: The Album	Sony Music
"Get on the Bus"¹	1999	Why Do Fools Fall in Love	Warner
"No More Rainy Days"¹	1999	The PJ's	Hollywood Records
"Perfect Man"¹	2000	Romeo Must Die	Virgin Records
"What Love Can Do"	2005	Coach Carter	Capitol Records – EMI
Note: 1. with Destiny's Child.

== Music videos ==
=== As lead artist ===
Title	Year	Director(s)	Ref.
"Torn"	2006	Chris Robinson	
"She Don't"	2006	Chris Robinson	
"Not Anymore"	2009	Bryan Barber	
"She Ain't Got..."	2009	Bryan Barber	
"Regret" (feat. Ludacris)	2009	Parris	
"Good to Me"	2010	AJ Crimson	
"Back 2 Life"	2017	Michael Vaughn Hernandez	
"Used To"	2017	Michael Vaughn Hernandez	
"In the Name"	2017	Michael Vaughn Hernandez	
"Love on Christmas"	2019	—N/a	

=== Other appearances ===
Title	Year	Artist(s)	Director(s)	Ref.
"Where the Party At (Remix)"	2001	Jagged Edge	Laurie Ann Gibson	
"If We Had Your Eyes"	2013	Michelle Williams	Derek Blanks	
"Honest"	2013	Future	Colin Tilley	

== See also ==
- Destiny's Child discography
