= Demps =

Demps is a surname. Notable people with the surname include:

- Bennie Demps (1950–2000), American serial killer
- Cody Demps (born 1993), American basketball player
- Dell Demps (born 1970), American basketball executive and former player
- Jeff Demps (born 1990), American track and field athlete and former American football player
- Marcus Demps (born 1983), American football player
- Quintin Demps (born 1985), American football player
- Tre Demps (born 1993), American basketball player
- Will Demps (born 1979), American football player
- Murielle Ahouré-Demps (born 1987), Ivorian sprinter
