= Back 2 Life (LeToya Luckett album) =

Studio album by LeToya Luckett
- Released: May 12, 2017
- Length: 51:17
- Label: eOne
- Producers: Jo Blaq; First Born; Warryn Campbell; D'Mile; Andre Harris; ohgoshleotus; J. White Did It; Y.B.S

LeToya Luckett chronology
Lady Love (2009)	Back 2 Life (2017)

Singles from Back 2 Life
- 1. "Back 2 Life" Released: December 7, 2016; 2. "Used To" Released: April 17, 2017; 3. "In the Name" Released: July 31, 2017

Back 2 Life is the third studio album by American R&B singer LeToya Luckett. It was released by eOne Music Entertainment on May 12, 2017. Her first album in eight years, it marked Luckett's first project as an independent artist after the release of her first two solo albums LeToya (2006) and Lady Love (2009), both of which were produced under Capitol Records. Luckett consulted a variety of musicians to work with her on Back 2 Life, including Jo Blaq, Warryn Campbell, D'Mile, Andre Harris, and J. White Did It.

The album earned generally positive reviews from music critics though some found that it lacked cohesiveness. Back 2 Life debuted and peaked at number 91 on the US Billboard 200, marking Luckett's lowest charting project in the United States up to then, and reached number four on the US Independent Albums chart. The album was preceded by two singles, including "Back 2 Life" and "Used To", the former of which peaked at number six on the Adult R&B Songs chart.

== Background and promotion ==
In January 2014, Luckett announced that the title of her third studio album would be called Until Then on The Wendy Williams Show, with a planned 2016 release. "Don't Make Me Wait" was released as a promotional single on February 11, 2014, to iTunes. More than a year later a remix featuring American-rapper T.I. was released on March 10, 2015. On January 5, 2015, Luckett released the track "I'm Ready" on her YouTube channel. On January 16, 2015, Luckett released "Together" inspired to end illegal gun violence in America in recent partnership with the Caliber Foundation.

On December 7, 2016, Luckett released the lead single "Back 2 Life" to iTunes. On March 23, 2017, eOne Music released the teaser trailer to the second single "Used To", continuing from the "Back 2 Life" music video. On April 10, 2017, Luckett announced the release date and new title of her upcoming third studio album on her Twitter account: "HEY LOVES!!! Excited to announce my album #Back2Life hits the stores May 12th!!!", thus renaming it from Until Then to Back 2 Life, with the song "Don't Make Me Wait" removed, and 13 songs added. On April 17, 2017, the album was available for pre-order on iTunes.

== Singles ==
"Back 2 Life" was released as the album's lead single on December 7, 2016. The song debuted at number 26 on the US Adult R&B Airplay chart on February 4, 2017 and has since peaked at number six. The music video was released to Luckett's Vevo account on January 10, 2017. "Used To" was released as the album's second single on April 17, 2017, with the music video premiering the same day. "In The Name" was released as the album's third single on the day of release, and the music video for it was released on July 31, 2017.

== Critical reception ==
Professional ratings
Review scores
Source	Rating
AllMusic	3/5 stars
Cryptick Rock	5/5 stars
Soul in Stereo	3.5/5 stars

Cryptic Rock's Jackie Knightowl called the album "a 13 course musical medley culinary masterpiece." She felt that with Back 2 Life, Luckett "wields her fairy wand and transforms each song into a gilded masterpiece, perfectly assembled with passionate lyrics and catchy rhythmic arrangements." Delux Magazine's Shadress Denise noted that "thirteen tracks of love, heartbreak, loneliness, and questions about where her quest of love will end make up this collection of songs. Each track not only demonstrates her growth in music, but life and love as well."

AllMusic editor Andy Kellman rated the album three stars out of five. He found that Back 2 Life was "worthy of notice" and noted that the album's "moments of pain and unease do alternate with warm slow jams and assured dancefloor grooves with the singer facing new horizons." Edward Bowser from Soul in Stereo called the album a "great showcase of LeToya’s musical diversity but sometimes that comes at the price of consistency. The album too often switches gears, bouncing from retro to big band and back to sparse modern production. While all of those tracks are notable individually, collectively they don’t make for a seamless listen and it hurts the overall package."

== Commercial performance ==
In the United States, Back 2 Life debuted and peaked at number ninety-one on the Billboard 200. It also reached number forty-four on the Top R&B/Hip Hop Albums chart, number thirty on the Top Album Sales chart, number fourteen on the R&B Albums chart, and number four on the Independent Albums chart. Back 2 Life was Luckett's first album not to reach the top spot on the Top R&B/Hip Hop Albums chart.

== Track listing ==
Back 2 Life track listing
No.	Title	Writer(s)	Producer(s)	Length
1.	"I'm Ready"	LeToya Luckett; Steven Battey; Carlos Battey; Dernst Emile	D'Mile	4:01
2.	"B2L"	L. Luckett; Curtis Troy Austin; Joseph "Jo Blaq" Macklin; Dashaun Leldevonne Newby	Jo Blaq; Y.B.S	4:13
3.	"Show Me"	L. Luckett; Anthony White; Macklin; Lauren Seymour; Charmelle Cofield	Blaq	3:55
4.	"Used To"	Anthony Saunders; Eric Dawkins; Macklin; White	J. White Did It; Blaq	3:50
5.	"Middle"	L. Luckett; Breana Marin; Dave Young; Leoren Davis; Roahn Hylton	First Born; ohgoshleotus	3:59
6.	"Grey" (featuring Ludacris)	Alvin Isaacs; Andre Harris; Chris Bridges; Darryl Farris	Andre Harris; Blaq	4:31
7.	"In the Name"	L. Luckett; Adonis Shropshire; J. Bynum; Warryn Campbell	Campbell	3:47
8.	"My Love"	L. Luckett; Shropshire; Campbell	Campbell	2:50
9.	"Worlds Apart"	Harris II; Farris; Macklin; Midian Mathers	Harris; Blaq	5:01
10.	"Weekend"	Brandon Black; Conrad Rei; D. Anderson; Gavin Luckett; Macklin; Seymour	Blaq	3:32
11.	"Higher"	G. Luckett; Isaacs; Farris; Macklin; Mathers	Blaq	3:35
12.	"Loving You"	L. Luckett; Marin; Young; Davis; Hylton	First Born; ohgoshleotus	3:38
13.	"Disconnected"	L. Luckett; Gabe Roland; Jeremiah Renaldo; Macklin	Blaq	4:20
Total length:				51:17

Notes

- "Back 2 Life" samples "Back to Life" by Soul II Soul.

== Charts ==
Weekly chart performance for Back 2 Life
Chart (2017)	Peak position
US Billboard 200	91
US Independent Albums (Billboard)	4
US Top R&B/Hip-Hop Albums (Billboard)	44

== Release history ==
Release dates and formats for Back 2 Life
Country	Date	Format	Label	Ref.
United States	May 12, 2017	Digital download	eOne Music Entertainment	
United Kingdom	May 12, 2017	Digital download	eOne Music Entertainment	
France	May 12, 2017	Digital download	eOne Music Entertainment	
United Kingdom	September 15, 2017	CD	eOne Music Entertainment	
