= Lady Love (LeToya Luckett album) =

Studio album by LeToya
- Released: August 24, 2009
- Studios: Glenwood Place Recording Studios (Burbank, CA); Pac-12 Studios (Hollywood, CA); Carrington House; Groove Room; Euro South Studios (Atlanta, GA)
- Length: 58:58
- Label: Capitol
- Producers: Blac Elvis; Cory Bold; Theron Feemster; Jerry "Texx" Franklin; Da Internz; Ryan Leslie; Harold Lilly; MaddScientist; Bei Maejor; Oak; Soundz; T-Minus; Tank

LeToya chronology
LeToya (2006)	Lady Love (2009)	Back 2 Life (2017)

Singles from Lady Love
- 1. "Not Anymore" Released: February 3, 2009; 2. "She Ain't Got..." Released: June 1, 2009; 3. "Regret" Released: November 11, 2009; 4. "Good to Me" Released: February 11, 2010

Lady Love is the second studio album by American R&B singer LeToya Luckett. It was released in Europe on August 24, 2009, and in the United States by Capitol Records on August 25, 2009. Originally scheduled for release several times in 2008, the album was released after corporate restructuring at the record company. As with her solo debut, the singer worked with a wide variety of collaborators for the album, including Ne-Yo, Chris Brown, Blac Elvis, Ryan Leslie, Harold Lilly, Bei Maejor, Oak, Soundz, T-Minus, and Tank.

The album earned generally positive reviews from music critics who praised its versatility, though some found that the project was uneven. Lady Love debuted and peaked at number twelve on the US Billboard 200 chart and at number one on the Top R&B/Hip-Hop Albums chart, beocoming Luckett's second album to claim the top spot. It produced four singles, including lead single "Not Anymore" and "Regret" with rapper Ludacris, the latter of which became a top ten hit on the Hot R&B/Hip-Hop Songs chart.

== Background ==
Production for Lady Love originally began in 2007, with a release scheduled several times in 2008. However, due to the fusing of Capitol Records and Virgin Records, funding for many artists was frozen until the completion of the merger, affecting not only the release of Lady Love but also the release of "Obvious", the third single from Luckett's self-titled debut album. In early 2009, the release date for Lady Love was announced to be May 19, 2009, however it was later pushed back to June 16, 2009, before finally being set to August 24, 2009.

Luckett worked with a wide variety of collaborators for the album, including R&B singer-songwriters Ne-Yo, Chris Brown and Tank. Featured guests include Ludacris, Estelle and Mims whilst some versions of the album feature bonus track "Swagger" which features rappers Bun B, Killa Kyleon, and Slim Thug. Described as "showcasing a more laid back and comfortable LeToya," Lady Love differs stylistically from its predecessor in that it incorporates less elements of hip-hop and hip-hop soul music, instead adopting a more polished, electronic sound.

== Composition ==
Lady Love is a contemporary R&B album, which Andy Kellman of AllMusic described as '"directed toward the pop market [...] heavier on gleaming synthesizers and in-your-face production." The album begins with the "conceited but confident up-tempo" song "Lady Love," which is followed by the startingly brash," "electronically soaked" track "She Ain't Got..." on which Luckett displays a "fierce personality," through her vocals and the lyrics, one line reading "bout to put my foot down on homegirl's neck, to make her see that, she ain't got s*** on me." From this point on, the album slows into more mid-tempos and ballads, such as the Ne-Yo composition "Not Anymore," which "tells a story about a young lady who decides enough is enough and tells her no good womanizing partner to leave" and the "break-up anthem" "Over." "Regret", featuring rapper Ludacris, has been repeatedly likened to the Mary Mary hit single "God in Me," with its "rat-a-tat snare" and "alternately gliding and prodding vocal attack," while Luckett's "breathy" vocal performance on the "steamy" and "sensual" song "I Need a U" – complete with a "burning" electric guitar solo – has been likened to the style of Janet Jackson.

On the "supremely smooth" song "Take Away Love" featuring British singer Estelle, Luckett plays the part of a lover who is having difficulty getting her lover to realise that she "doesn't want a relationship with him" because she is "still in love" with her "ex" and he "doesn't understand that." While on the "sensely layered" song "Good to Me" which has been described as "serious and sexy at the same time" and likened to some of the material on R&B singer Usher's 2004 album Confessions album, Luckett names and describes the qualities she wants in her ideal man, emphasising that he must be "good to [her]." The tempo of the album "slows down towards the end" with the songs "Drained", "Tears" and the Marsha Ambrosius-penned "Matter." Shortly before closing the album, Luckett "shows off her upper vocal register" on "Don't Need You" which has been herladed as her "best recording to-date" by Timothy Michael Carson of About.com.

== Release and promotion ==
Amidst anticipation for the album release, Luckett released a five-track sampler on May 19, 2009. The sampler features first single "Not Anymore" and 1 minute 30 second snippets of "Regret", "She Ain't Got...", "Lady Love" and "Matter". The album was released on physically and digitally on August 25, 2009 in the United States and worldwide a day earlier. An explicit version of the album is also available and bears a Parental Advisory label. To celebrate the album's release, Luckett hosted an album release party at Cain in New York City on August 27, 2009.

=== Singles ===
"Not Anymore", the lead single, was produced by Bei Maejor and co-produced and written by Ne-Yo. Released in February 2009, it became the most added song at urban radio, debuting at number ninety-eight on the US Billboard Hot R&B/Hip-Hop Songs chart before peaking at number eighteen and just missing the US Billboard Hot 100 singles chart, peaking at number one-hundred-and-seven. A music video for the single was shot on February 13, 2009. Directed by Bryan Barber, the music video is set in the 1960s and is split into 3 sections/time periods – 1961, 1964 and 1968. The sets, costumes and props change accordingly in each section to show the trends, fashions and styles of those particular years. The video was released on March 10, 2009 and peaked at number three on the 106 & Park video countdown.

"She Ain't Got..." the album's second single, was produced by Cory Bold and written by LeToya, Andre Merritt, Chris Brown and Bold. Chosen by fans, it became the first LeToya single to carry a Parental Advisory label, though a "clean" version was also released. It became the most added song on rhythmic radio, thus peaking at number thirty-nine on the Billboard Rhythmic Top 40 chart, while peaking at number seventy-five on the Billboard Pop 100 Airplay chart and number twenty on the Billboard Hot Dance Club Play. However, the single was most successful in Japan where it peaked at number forty-nine on the Japan Hot 100. A music video, directed by Bryan Barber was shot on June 3, 2009 and premiered on Yahoo Music on June 30, 2009, featuring guest star Major League Baseball players Orlando Hudson and Matt Kemp of the Los Angeles Dodgers as well as Baseball Hall of Fame member Dave Winfield.

"Regret", featuring rapper Ludacris, was produced by Tank and Jerry "Texx" Franklin and written by Tank, LeToya, Franklin, K. Stephens, J. Valentine, R. Newt and C. Bridges. Released as the third single – based only on downloads and airplay – "Regret" peaked at number eight on the US Billboard Hot R&B/Hip-Hop Songs chart and debuted at number one-hundred on the Billboard Hot 100, making it LeToya's first single since her debut; "Torn", to enter the US Hot 100, peaking at number seventy-eight. It also peaked at number forty-two on the Billboard Radio Songs chart and was listed at number six on AOL Music's "Top R&B Songs of 2009" list. The music video for "Regret" was premiered on BET's 106 & Park on November 11, 2009 before being ranked at number twenty-three on BET: Notarized: Top 100 Videos of 2009 countdown.

"Good To Me", produced by Tank and Jerry "Texx" Franklin and written by Tank, Franklin, K. Stephens, R. Newt and J. Valentine, was released as the album's fourth and final single. Though the song failed to chart, a music video directed by makeup artist AJ Crimson and co-starring model-actor Keston Karter was released on February 11, 2010.

== Critical reception ==
Professional ratings
Review scores
Source	Rating
About.com	3/5 stars
AllMusic	3/5 stars

Lady Love received generally positive reviews from critics. Samantha Greaves of Examiner.com described the album as "very diverse," listing "Take Away Love" as "one of the gems on Lady Love" and praised "LeToya's ability to think out the box and to bring to R&B music something different than the vast majority." Meanwhile, Timothy Michael Carson from About.com praised Luckett's "versatility" and "soft soprano vocals," but wrote that "many of the songs tend to sound alike" and so "Lady Love can quickly become a tiresome listen." Carson commented that "LeToya's vocals are what kept [him] replaying the album over", lending particularly praise to the tracks "I Need a U" and "Don't Need U" − which he named "LeToya's best recording to-date" − before describing the album as a "great listen."

Nathan S. of DJBooth.net also gave a particularly favorable review of "I Need a U", which he described as a "breathy and burning track that should set the sheets on fire". However, he also noted that Lady Love "isn't a perfect album" and "at times it feels uninspired and overly deliberate" but wrote that "it's clearly the work of a woman coming into her own as an artist" and so promised that he is "not going to attach a “formerly of Destiny's Child” onto LeToya Luckett's name. She will finally be, simply, LeToya. She's earned it." AllMusic editor Andy Kellman gave a more mixed review however, describing the album as being "just as scattered and uneven as LeToya's self-titled debut," but noted that there are no "shortage of high points," listing; "Regret", the "pummeling, startlingly brash" "She Ain't Got..." and "the melancholy" "Take Away Love" as particular stand-outs. On the contrary, Diana Ayok of SoulCulture rated the album 3.5 out of 5, noting it as "better and stronger than [LeToya's] first self titled album" and heralded it as "a genuinely impressive album" that she "would recommend" to "any R&B lover."

== Commercial performance ==
In the United States, Lady Love opened with first week sales of 32,900 copies, debuting at the top of the Billboard Top R&B/Hip-Hop Albums chart on September 12, 2009, replacing Ledisi's Turn Me Loose. It spent a total of thirty-two weeks on the chart. Lady Love also reached number twelve on the US Billboard 200, where it remained a total of twelve weeks within the top 200.

== Track listing ==
Lady Love track listing
No.	Title	Writer(s)	Producer(s)	Length
1.	"Lady Love"	Theron Feemster; LeToya Luckett; Ke'Ana Pratt; Kayla Shelton	Feemster	3:38
2.	"She Ain't Got..."	Cory Bold; Chris Brown; Luckett; Andre Merritt	Bold; Brown^{[a]}; Merritt^{[a]}^{[b]}	3:40
3.	"Not Anymore"	Brandon Green; Shaffer Smith	Bei Maejor; Ne-Yo^{[a]}; Sauce^{[b]}	3:53
4.	"Lazy"	Crystal Nicole; Kenneth Coby	Soundz; Cri$tyle^{[b]}	4:11
5.	"Good to Me"	Durrell Babbs; Jerry "Texx" Franklin; Robert Newt; Kristina Stephens; J. Valentine	Tank; Franklin	3:53
6.	"Over"	Babbs; Joseph Bereal; Antonio Dixon; Franklin; Newt; Stephens	Tank	3:48
7.	"Regret" (featuring Ludacris)	Babbs; Christopher Bridges; Franklin; Luckett; Newt; Stephens; Valentine	Tank; Franklin	4:05
8.	"I Need a U"	Luckett; Lilly; Elvis Williams	BlacElvis; Lilly	4:15
9.	"Take Away Love" (featuring Estelle)	Ryan Leslie; Estelle Sway	Leslie; J. Valentine^{[b]}	4:16
10.	"After Party"	Frankie Storm; Warren Felder	Oak; Storm^{[b]}	3:25
11.	"Drained"	Brown; Luckett; Merritt; Tyler Williams	T-Minus; Brown^{[b]}; Merritt^{[b]}	3:21
12.	"Tears"	Storm; Felder	Oak; Storm^{[b]}	4:03
13.	"Matter"	Marsha Ambrosius; Felder	Oak; Ambrosius^{[b]}	4:10
14.	"Love Rollercoaster" (featuring Mims)	Ernest Clark; Corey Llewellyn; Erik Mendelson; Shawn Mims; Marcos Palacios	Da Internz	3:55
15.	"Don't Need U"	Luckett; Theodore Thomas; David Young	Terry "MaddScientist" Thomas	4:19
Total length:				58:58

Japanese bonus track
No.	Title	Length
16.	"Swagger" (featuring Bun B, Killa Kyleon & Slim Thug)	3:57

iTunes Store bonus track
No.	Title	Writer(s)	Producer(s)	Length
16.	"Don't Let Me Get Away"	Feemster; Luckett; Shelton	Feemster	4:18

Notes

- ^{^[a]} denotes co-producer(s)
- ^{^[b]} denotes vocal producer(s)

== Personnel ==
Credits adapted from the album's liner notes and Allmusic.com

- LeToya Luckett – lead vocals, background vocals, executive producer
- Estelle – background vocals
- Ankur Malhotra – A&R
- Leonard Brooks – A&R
- Ronette Bowie – A&R
- Darius "My Turn" Jones – A&R direction
- Damon Thompson – associate producer
- Nicole Frantz – creative director
- Terry "TR" Ross – executive producer
- Chris Hicks – executive producer
- Jeff Robinson – management
- Suzette Williams – management
- Marketing – Leota Blacknor – marketing
- Julian Peploe – design
- Mike Ruiz – photography
- Marni Senofonte – stylist
- Chris Morgan – guitar
- Andre Merritt – arranger, producer, vocal production
- Anthony Palazzole – engineer
- Brian Springer – engineer, mixing
- Danny Cheung – engineer
- Geno Regist – engineer
- John Hanes – engineer
- Kenneth "SoundZ" Coby – engineer, producer
- Ralph Cacciurri – engineer
- Richard Furch – engineer
- Ashley Stagg – engineer assistant
- Tom Roberts – engineer assistant
- Chris "The Finalizer" Bellman – mastering
- Dave Pensado – mixing
- Joshua Fowler – mixing
- Kevin "KD" Davis – mixing
- Serban Ghenea – mixing
- Bei Maejor – producer
- Cory Bold – producer
- Jay Henchman – producer
- Da Internz – producer
- Elvis "BlacK Elvis" Williams – producer
- Harold Lilly – producer
- Jerry "Texx" Franklin – producer
- Ne-Yo – producer
- Ron "Neff-U" Feemster – producer
- Ryan Leslie – producer, programming, engineer, background vocals, other instrumentation
- Tank – producer
- Terry "MaddScientist" Thomas – producer
- T-Minus – producer
- Warren "Oak" Felder – producer, vocal producer
- Chris Brown – vocal producer, arranger
- Cri$tyle – vocal producer, background vocals
- Frankie Storm - vocal producer
- Kristina Stephens - vocal producer, background vocals
- J. Valentine – vocal producer
- Marsha Ambrosius – vocal producer
- Robert Teamer – vocal producer
- Sauce – vocal producer

== Charts ==
=== Weekly charts ===
Weekly chart performance for Lady Love
Chart (2009)	Peak position
Japanese Albums (Oricon)	54
US Billboard 200	12
US Top R&B/Hip-Hop Albums (Billboard)	1

=== Year-end charts ===
Year-end chart performance for Lady Love
Chart (2009)	Position
US Top R&B/Hip-Hop Albums (Billboard)	71

== Release history ==
Release dates and formats for Lady Love
Region	Date	Format	Label
Europe	August 24, 2009	CD; digital download	Capitol Records
United States	August 25, 2009	CD; digital download	Capitol Records
