= Highland High School (Palmdale, California) =

Location
- 39055 25th Street West; Palmdale, California 93551; United States
- 34°35′32″N 118°10′35″W

Information
- Type: Public High School
- Established: 1989; 37 years ago
- NCES School ID: 060282009515
- Principal: Charles Dunn
- Teaching staff: 109.38 (on a FTE basis)
- Grades: 9-12
- Enrollment: 2,790 (2022–23)
- Student to teacher ratio: 25.51
- Colors: Cardinal and Gold
- Nickname: Bulldogs
- Yearbook: Paragon
- Website: www.highlandhs.org

Highland High School is located in Palmdale, California and is part of the Antelope Valley Union High School District.

== Demographics ==
The demographic breakdown of the approximately 2800 students enrolled in 2022–23 was:

- Male - 51.4%
- Female - 48.6%
- Asian - 3.3%
- Black - 15.7%
- Hispanic - 68.4%
- White - 8.0%
- Two of more races - 4.1%
- Other - 0.5%

== Sports ==
Sports offered as of the 2023/2024 school year include :

- Girls and Boys Tennis
- Girls and Boys Golf
- Girls and Boys Soccer
- Girls and Boys Basketball
- Girls and Boys Volleyball
- Girls and Boys Swim
- Girls and Boys Track
- Girls and Boys Wrestling
- Girls Flag Football
- Baseball
- Softball
- Football
- Cross Country
- Cheerleading
- Dance Team

== Notable alumni ==
- Kurt Caselli, motocross racer
- Matt Eskandari,Hollywood director
- Marcus Demps, NFL football player
- Will Demps, NFL football player
- Sean Franklin, MLS Soccer player
- Shauna Gambill, Miss Teen USA 1994
- Jason Kubel, Major League Baseball player
- Ryan Millar, Olympic volleyball player
- DeShawn Shead, NFL football player
- Rachel Garcia, softball pitcher
