= When I Had the Chance =

Single by Boney James featuring LeToya

from the album Contact
- Released: March 7, 2011 (United States)
- Recorded: Miami; December 2010
- Genre: Smooth jazz; R&B
- Length: 3:53
- Label: Verve; Concord

Boney James singles chronology
"Here She Comes" (2004)	"When I Had the Chance" (2011)

LeToya singles chronology
"Good to Me" (2010)	"When I Had the Chance" (2011)	"Don't Make Me Wait" (2014)

iTunes Alternative cover

"When I Had the Chance" is a song by American jazz saxophonist Boney James from his sixteenth studio album Contact (2011). The track was released as the album's second single (but the first in the urban format) and features the platinum-selling R&B singer LeToya Luckett. The song consists basically with LeToya as the vocalist and James Boney providing background saxophone instrumentals. The song's creation (along with all the other songs from the same album) feature the same background development story, a reflection about his own career. Musically, the song consists of heavy saxophone instrumentals with lyrics regarding sorrow and regret feelings. The lyrics refer to a lost opportunity of kissing someone.

Produced, arranged and co-written by James, "When I Had The Chance" is a soulful Smooth-Jazz song, with Soul influence and leaned to R&B side of instrumental music. The song was released to the U.S. radio stations on March 7, 2011 and to online digital media store on March 15, 2011.

== Background and release ==
In 2010, James was involved in a car crash while driving home from a Jazz festival in Newport Beach, California. He was standing still in traffic in Long Beach, California when a car, supposedly driven by a drunken person, struck his car on the 405 freeway. As a result of the incident he was taken hospitalized with a fractured jaw, two broken teeth, a moderated wound in his chin that needed fourteen stitches and had to cancel several forthcoming shows. After the incident he could not play sax for six weeks and even though he returned to perform on-stage, he started to reflect about his career and his possibles whereabouts. Inspired by the incident and past decisions James created the album Contact, producing and co-writing every piece of the album, including the vocal numbers, after changing management, agency and label. In an interview with Billboard, James addressed about label changes:

When you have a sax in your hands, you are immediately a jazz artist, but I've never thought of myself that way. And Verve fits me in terms of crossing over.

And in an interview with Examiner.com he talked about his inspiration for the album:

One moment, I was on my way home thinking about what I was going to have for dinner and the next moment I was in an ambulance with a fractured jaw and two missing front teeth thinking I may never play my sax again. Looking at the car, I knew I could have been killed. Months later, after healing, I was so grateful to be back on stage and back to work on the CD. The experience has actually had a positive effect on my shows and it was a great influence on the new CD, Contact.
