= Regret (LeToya Luckett song) =

Single by LeToya featuring Ludacris

from the album Lady Love
- Released: November 11, 2009
- Genre: R&B; hip hop soul
- Length: 4:05
- Label: Capitol
- Songwriters: Durrell Babbs; Christopher Bridges; Jerry "Texx" Franklin; LeToya Luckett; Kristina Stephens; J. Valentine
- Producers: Tank; Jerry "Texx" Franklin

LeToya singles chronology
"She Ain't Got..." (2009)	"Regret" (2009)	"Good to Me" (2010)

Ludacris singles chronology
"Bulletproof" (2008)	"Regret" (2009)	"How Low" (2010)

Music video
- "Regret" on YouTube

"Regret" is a song recorded by American singer LeToya Luckett, released as the third single taken from her second studio album Lady Love (2009) featuring American rapper Ludacris. It was written by Luckett, Ludacris, Tank, Jerry "Texx" Franklin, Kristina Stephens, and J. Valentine and produced by Tank and Franklin. The song was released on November 11, 2009, through Capitol Records. The Sky High Remix of "Regret" was released digitally on December 18, 2009. It contains a nearly identical instrumental to that of a previous Tank production, "Ghetto" (2007) by Kelly Rowland.

The song became her second most successful single of her solo career, behind Luckett's debut single "Torn." While a music video was not initially released to promote the single, "Regret" quickly moved up the US Hot R&B/Hip-Hop Songs chart. It eventually peaked at number 8, becoming Luckett's fourth top twenty hit on that chart. It also peaked at number 78 on the US Billboard Hot 100. A music video, directed by Parris Maritn, is set in Los Angeles and co-stars model Sean Newman.

== Chart performance ==
On October 3, 2009, "Regret" peaked at number thirty-four on the US Adult R&B Songs chart. On November 14, 2009, the song peaked at number seventy-eight on the US Billboard Hot 100 chart, number eight on the US Hot R&B/Hip-Hop Songs and US Hot R&B/Hip-Hop Airplay chart and number forty-two on the US Radio Songs chart.

== Music video ==
Capitol Records initially had no plans to produce a music video for "Regret." Backed by a public online petition, the song was eventually granted a video when it was climbing up the R&B charts. Directed by Parris Maritn, it was shot in Los Angeles, California and features model Sean Newman (who previously played Luckett's boyfriend in her “She Ain’t Got…” video). "Regret" premiered on BET's 106 & Park on November 11, 2009. It was ranked at number 23 on BET: Notarized: Top 100 Videos of 2009 countdown.

== Remixes ==
The Sky High Remix of "Regret" was released digitally on December 18, 2009. Another remix with new lyrics and production, and a feature from rapper Missy Elliott leaked to the internet on November 18, 2009.

== Track listing and formats ==
Sky High Remix
No.	Title	Producer(s)	Length
1.	"Regret" (Sky High Remix featuring Ludacris)	Tank; Jerry "Texx" Franklin; Aaron Sledge^{[a]}; Marqus Curtis^{[a]}	4:13

GL Remix
No.	Title	Producer(s)	Length
1.	"Regret" (GL Remix featuring Ludacris)	Tank; Franklin; Gavin Luckett^{[a]}; Brandon Pitre^{[a]}	4:02

== Charts ==
=== Weekly charts ===
Weekly chart performance for "Regret"
Chart (2009)	Peak position
Netherlands (Urban Top 100)	67
US Billboard Hot 100	78
US Hot R&B/Hip-Hop Songs (Billboard)	8

=== Year-end charts ===
2009 year-end chart performance for "She Don't"
Chart (2009)	Position
US Hot R&B/Hip-Hop Songs (Billboard)	74

2010 year-end chart performance for "She Don't"
Chart (2010)	Position
US Hot R&B/Hip-Hop Songs (Billboard)	88

== Release history ==
Release dates and formats for "Torn"
Region	Date	Version	Label	Ref.
United States	December 18, 2009	Sky High Remix	Capital	
United Kingdom	December 18, 2009	Sky High Remix	Capital	
United States	January 12, 2010	GL Remix	Capital	
