= Will Demps =

American football player (born 1979)

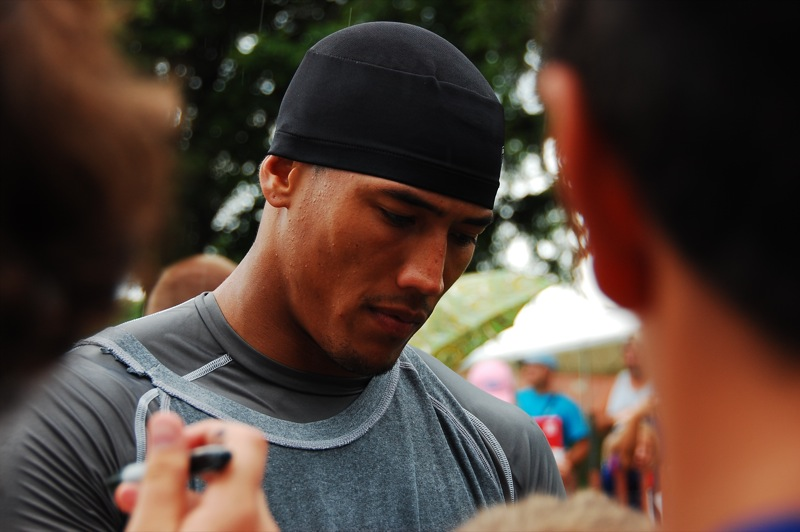
- Demps at the New York Giants 2007 training camp

No. 47
- Position: Safety

Personal information
- Born: November 7, 1979 (age 46); Charleston, South Carolina, U.S.
- Listed height: 6 ft 0 in (1.83 m)
- Listed weight: 208 lb (94 kg)

Career information
- High school: Highland (Palmdale, California)
- College: San Diego State
- NFL draft: 2002: undrafted

Career history
- Baltimore Ravens (2002–2005); New York Giants (2006); Houston Texans (2007–2008)

Awards and highlights
- 2× First-team All-MW (2000, 2001)

Career NFL statistics
- Total tackles: 426
- Sacks: 4.5
- Forced fumbles: 7
- Fumble recoveries: 8
- Interceptions: 6
- Defensive touchdowns: 1
- Stats at Pro Football Reference

William Henry Demps Jr. (born November 7, 1979) is an American former professional football player who was a safety in the National Football League (NFL). He played college football at San Diego State and was signed by the Baltimore Ravens as an undrafted free agent in 2002.

Demps also played for the New York Giants and Houston Texans. He is the older brother of former NFL safety Marcus Demps.

== Early life ==
He was born in South Carolina to a Korean mother and African American father, but moved to California. He went to Highland High School, located in Palmdale, California. As a child he also lived on Mather Air Force Base in Sacramento, California.

== College career ==
Demps was a walk-on who was a two-year starter at San Diego State University where he was also a member of Sigma Pi fraternity. He was a two-time All-Mountain West first-team selection. During his college career, Demps recorded 229 career tackles (135 solo), including 15 tackles for loss, and five interceptions.

Demps played primarily on special teams as a red-shirt freshman. He majored in Information Decision Systems.

Demps posted 140 tackles (125 solo) and one interception as a sophomore in 1999. He recorded his first career interception and returned it 73 yards for a touchdown against Wyoming. Demps also had five tackles, including one tackle for a loss against the Cowboys.

Demps started all 11 games at strong safety as a junior. He earned first-team All-Mountain West honors and finished second on the team and sixth in Mountain West with 97 tackles (51 solo). He also had two interceptions and led the team with 15 tackles for loss. He opened the season with 15 tackles (ten solo), including three tackles for a loss.

Demps started all 11 games at strong safety as a senior in 2001 and earned a second consecutive First-team All-Mountain West honors. He posted 92 tackles, including a career-high 59 solo, along with two interceptions.

== Professional career ==
=== Baltimore Ravens ===
Demps went undrafted in the 2002 NFL draft, but was signed by the Baltimore Ravens where he played from 2002 to 2005.

He played in 14 games, starting 10 after making the Ravens roster as a rookie free agent. He recorded 53 tackles, one sack, one forced fumble and a game-saving interception vs. Jacksonville.

In 2003, Demps saw action in all 16 regular season games with nine starts for Ravens and recorded 59 total tackles, two interceptions and one forced fumble. He made his first career post-season start in Baltimore's Wild Card loss to Tennessee.

In 2004, Demps started all 16 games for the first time in his career, tying for sixth on the team (Gary Baxter) with 86 tackles, including 72 solo. He also recorded 2.5 sacks, two forced fumbles, two fumble recoveries and one interception on the season. Demps notched career highs with 15 tackles, including 14 solo against the Bengals.

Demps started in all 11 games in which he played at free safety for Baltimore in 2005 before tearing his ACL and being placed on injured reserve on December 2, 2005. Before his injury, he tallied 70 tackles and two fumble recoveries, plus seven special teams tackles.

=== New York Giants ===
Demps was signed by the New York Giants in the offseason. He started all 16 games for the Giants in 2006.

=== Houston Texans ===
Demps was signed by the Houston Texans on September 11, 2007. He played in 15 games, starting the last 8 games of the season. He was named an AFC Pro Bowl alternate.

The Texans released Demps on February 25, 2009.

=== NFL statistics ===
Year	Team	Games	Combined tackles	Tackles	Assisted tackles	Sacks	Forced fumbles	Fumble recoveries	Fumble return yards	Interceptions	Interception return yards	Yards per interception return	Longest interception return	Interceptions returned for touchdown	Passes defended
2002	BAL	14	53	47	6	1.0	1	0	0	1	18	18	18	0	5
2003	BAL	16	44	35	9	0.0	1	0	0	2	57	29	54	0	5
2004	BAL	16	85	66	19	2.5	2	2	0	1	0	0	0	0	7
2005	BAL	11	52	48	4	0.0	0	2	0	0	0	0	0	0	2
2006	NYG	16	100	74	26	1.0	1	2	0	2	30	15	29	0	7
2007	HOU	15	52	41	11	0.0	2	2	0	0	0	0	0	0	4
2008	HOU	9	32	20	12	0.0	0	0	0	0	0	0	0	0	0
Career		97	418	331	87	4.5	7	8	0	6	105	18	54	0	30

== Personal life ==
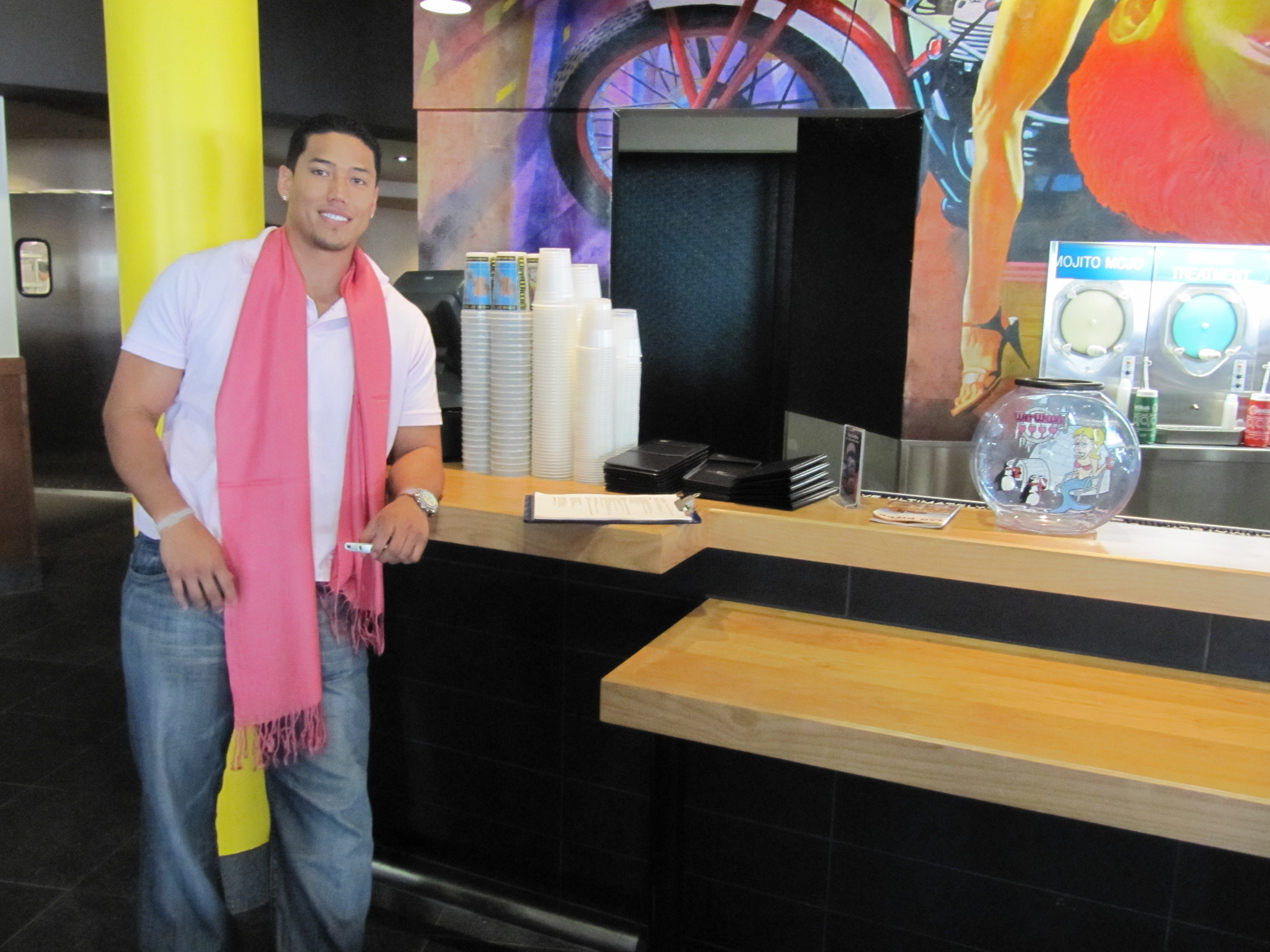
Will Demps at his Wet Willie's franchise Grand Opening, San Diego, 2010

Demps is the oldest brother of Marcus Demps. He occasionally works as a model in his spare time. He made an appearance in ex-Destiny's Child band member Letoya Luckett's first solo video "Torn".

He lived in San Diego Bay and his home was featured in on the MTV show Cribs; however, after being signed by the New York Giants he owned a home in Northern New Jersey. Demps can speak conversationally in Spanish and Korean.

Demps was also the owner of a Wet Willie's chain bar in San Diego, California, the first on the West Coast, which celebrated its Grand Opening on October 8, 2010, and featured dishes influenced by his mother's home cooking such as the Seoul tacos. Demps hired a muralist to paint the walls with San Diego landmark scenes including Unconditional Surrender that stands next to the USS Midway Museum. Several of Demps's celebrity friends attended to show their support, including Shaun Phillips and Stephen Cooper of the San Diego Chargers, Carlos Emmons (formerly with the Steelers, Eagles and Giants) and Robert Griffith of the Minnesota Vikings. Demps and his friends sported pink scarves in honor of breast cancer awareness month and a few of the slushy daiquiri drinks sported names in reference to the issue including one by the name of "Save the Tatas."
