= Good to Me =

Single by LeToya

from the album Lady Love
- Released: February 1, 2010 (U.S.)
- Genre: R&B; hip hop
- Length: 3:53
- Label: Capitol Music Group
- Songwriters: Durrell Babbs; Jerry N Franklin; Johnnie Newt; Robert Newt; Kris Stephens
- Producers: Tank; Song Dynasty

LeToya singles chronology
"Regret" (2009)	"Good to Me" (2010)	"When I Had the Chance" (2011)

Music video
- "Good To Me" on YouTube

"Good to Me" is a song recorded by American singer LeToya Luckett released as the fourth and final single taken from her second studio album Lady Love (2009). The song was written by Durrell Babbs, Jerry N Franklin, Johnnie Newt, Robert Newt, Kris Stephens and produced by Tank and Song Dynasty. The song was released on February 1, 2010, through Capitol Records.

Luckett chose to release "Good to Me" due to being a fan favorite and a personal favorite from the album.

== Critical response ==
Idolator stated "the singer notes that she wants “the kind of man that all night in bed he’s a winner,” with the “body of a gladiator” who “don’t mind cooking me dinner.” Guess the onetime Destiny’s Child member wasn’t too big on Beyoncé’s “Single Ladies”?."

== Music video ==
The song's accompanying video was shot in New York City and released to LeToya's YouTube channel on February 23, 2010. The music video starts with "I Need a U" taken from the album Lady Love, also model and actor Keston Karter appears as LeToya's love interest, and was directed and produced by LeToya's friend and makeup artist AJ Crimson, marking his directorial debut.

=== Response ===
Rap-Up stated "LeToya Luckett dedicates her latest song to all the good men. The viral video for “Good to Me,” the fourth single from her sophomore album Lady Love, was directed by makeup artist AJ Crimson and co-stars model-actor Keston Karter." Idolator stated "LeToya did an OK job by casting hunky model Keston Karter as the object of her affection in the “Good To Me” video."
