= Back 2 Life (song) =

Single by LeToya Luckett

from the album Back 2 Life
- Released: December 7, 2016
- Recorded: 2014–2015
- Genre: R&B
- Length: 4:01
- Label: eOne Music
- Songwriters: Curtis Troy Austin, LeToya Luckett, Joe Macklin, Dashaun Leldevonne Newby
- Producers: Jo Blaq, Curtis Troy Austin, Dashaun Leldevonne Newby

LeToya Luckett singles chronology
"Don't Make Me Wait" (2014)	"Back 2 Life" (2016)	"Used To" (2017)

Music video
- "Back 2 Life" on Youtube.com

"Back 2 Life" (titled "B2L" on the digital format of the album) is a song recorded by American singer LeToya Luckett, for her third studio album Back 2 Life (2017). The song was released on December 7, 2016, by eOne Music Entertainment. The song samples “Back to Life (However Do You Want Me)” (1989) by Soul II Soul.

== Background and promotion ==
Following the release of the single, Luckett posted pictures of a photo shoot and the single's artwork on her Instagram account. A teaser trailer for the music video was posted on Luckett's Instagram account on December 12, 2016.

== Critical reception ==
The song was well received by critics. Billboard stated "The end of 2016 is near, but there’s still tons of new music to look forward to before it comes to a close. LeToya Luckett will return from a musical hiatus with her long-awaited new single “Back2Life” hitting iTunes this week. The single’s exclusive artwork features Luckett sporting cropped blond hair, a black leather choker, and fierce cat-eye liner." Rap-Up stated in a review "LeToya Luckett is “Back.” Following a hiatus from music, the former Destiny’s Child songstress unleashes her new single, “Back 2 Life,” off her upcoming album Until Then. Sampling Soul II Soul’s classic “Back to Life (However Do You Want Me),” LeToya sings about a failing relationship. While the muse for the track is unknown, it could be inspired by art imitating life." Singersroom described the track as a "mid-tempo, laid-back groove," while SheBOPS noted that the song's "sombre R&B sounds sonically pinpoint the vulnerable realities of a painfully toxic relationship."

== Music video ==
=== Release ===
On December 14, 2016, a 40-second teaser trailer for the music video was posted to Luckett's YouTube account. It was directed and produced by Michael Vaughn Hernandez and executive produced by Luckett. The music video, which features actor and former American football running back Thomas Jones, was released on Luckett's VEVO account on January 10, 2017.

=== Synopsis ===
The music video, which is over eight minutes long, begins with LeToya in a perfect relationship. The plot twists when she suspects that her significant other is a little too friendly with his female best friend. The video ends with a heated argument between LeToya and her man, resulting in her leaving the relationship with a "to be continued...".

=== Reception ===
Amber McKynzie from The Boombox wrote "It’s a new year, which means it’s time to be out with the old and in with the new; or simply take some time to focus on you. At least that’s the mindset LeToya Luckett follows in her new video, 'Back 2 Life.' LeToya Luckett recounts a love story gone wrong thanks to a good “friend” named Cynthia. First in love and floating through the honeymoon stage, Luckett discovers the man she thought she knew is nothing like the man she met after meeting his childhood friend who’s a little too close for comfort." Lauren Porter from Essence commented: "Ladies, we've all been there: you're dating a great guy who wants you to meet his female friend who you suspect wants to be more than that. Well, in LeToya Luckett's new video for her song, "Back 2 Life" art truly imitates reality with a scenario we can all say we've encountered at least once or twice. With some steamy eye-candy from Being Mary Jane's former "cuddy buddy," Thomas Q. Jones, Luckett and her on-screen love serve up a true cautionary tale for what it means when he says, 'don't worry baby, she's just my friend.'"

== Chart performance ==
The song debuted at number twenty-six on the US Adult R&B Airplay chart on February 4, 2017. In its second and third week, the song charted at number twenty-two and number twenty respectively. In its twelfth week, the song peaked at number eleven. In its fourteenth week, the song peaked at number seven.

== Track listing ==
Digital download
No.	Title	Length
1.	"Back 2 Life"	4:01

== Charts ==
Chart (2017)	Peak position
US Adult R&B Songs (Billboard)	6
US R&B/Hip-Hop Airplay (Billboard)	33

== Release history ==
Region	Date	Format	Label	Ref
Various	December 7, 2016	Digital download	eOne Music	
