= Not Anymore =

Single by LeToya

from the album Lady Love
- Released: February 3, 2009 (U.S.)
- Recorded: Atlanta; November 2008
- Genre: R&B
- Length: 3:53
- Label: Capitol Music Group
- Songwriters: Ne-Yo, Bei Maejor
- Producer: Bei Maejor

LeToya singles chronology
| "I Miss You" (2008) | "Not Anymore" (2009) | ""She Ain't Got..."" (2009) |

Music video
- "Not Anymore" on YouTube

"Not Anymore" is a song recorded by American singer LeToya Luckett released as the lead single taken from her second studio album Lady Love (2009). The song was written by Ne-Yo and produced by Bei Maejor. It was digitally released on February 3, 2009 through Capitol Music Group.

== Music video ==
The video was shot in Los Angeles on February 13, 2009. The mini-movie was directed by Bryan Barber. It is set in the 1960s, but has a modern feel similar to Barber’s video for Christina Aguilera's "Ain't No Other Man."

The video begins on an old revival tour bus, travels to a backstage area, and ends on an “American Bandstand”-like stage. LeToya plays Dorothy Campbell, or "Dot", who is the newest addition to a Motown record label and is burning up the charts, eventually moving on from the man who broke her heart and reveling in the ultimate revenge — success. Her boyfriend is played by Lance Gross, who cheats on Dot with one of her background singers.

The video is split into 3 sections/time periods – 1961, 1964 and 1968. The sets, costumes and props change accordingly in each section to show the trends, fashions and styles of those particular years.

The video was released on March 10, 2009. As of May 5, 2009 the video has peaked at number three on 106 & Park.

== Chart performance ==
"Not Anymore" was the most added song at Urban radio as of February 28, 2009, and one of the top 20 gainers on Urban stations after an increase of 132 spins. The single entered the US Hot R&B/Hip-Hop Songs chart at No. 98, eventually peaking at No. 18 to become her third top 20. The song peaked at No. 7 on the US Bubbling Under Hot 100 Singles chart. On July 11, 2009, the song peaked at number eighteen on the US R&B/Hip-Hop Airplay chart, the song spent a total of twenty-two weeks on the chart. On September 26, 2009, "Not Anymore" debuted at number forty on the Adult R&B Songs chart for one week before falling out the chart.

== Charts ==
=== Weekly charts ===
Weekly chart performance for "Not Anymore"
| Chart (2009) | Peak position |
|---|---|
| US Bubbling Under Hot 100 (Billboard) | 7 |
| US Hot R&B/Hip-Hop Songs (Billboard) | 18 |
| US Adult R&B Songs (Billboard) | 40 |

=== Year-end charts ===
Year-end chart performance for "Not Anymore"
| Chart (2009) | Position |
|---|---|
| US Hot R&B/Hip-Hop Songs (Billboard) | 85 |
