= She Don't =

Single by LeToya

from the album LeToya
- Released: June 29, 2006
- Length: 4:04
- Label: Capitol
- Songwriter(s): Walter Millsap III; Candice Nelson; Yvette Davis
- Producer(s): Walter Milsap; Candice Nelson

LeToya singles chronology
"Torn" (2006)	"She Don't" (2006)	"Obvious" (2006)

"She Don't" is a song by American R&B singer LeToya Luckett. It was written and produced by Walter "Lil' Walt" Milsap III and Candice Nelson for her solo debut album LeToya (2006). The song features samples from "We Belong Together" (1973) by American rhythm and blues vocal group The Spinners. Due to the inclusion of the sample, Yvette Davis is also credited as a songwriter. "She Don't" was released as the album's second single in the summer of 2006 and peaked at nunber 17 on the US Hot R&B/Hip-Hop Songs chart.

== Background ==
"She Don't" was written and produced by Walter "Lil' Walt" Milsap III and Candice Nelson. The song samples from "We Belong Together" (1973) by American rhythm and blues vocal group The Spinners, as written by Yvette Davis. Selected as the second single to be lifted from her solo debut album LeToya (2006), Luckett explained to MTV Newsin 2006 that "She Don't" was released as "a kind of a follow-up to "Torn" since we have decided to leave him alone," referencing 'the love-him-or-leave-him story line' of "Torn." She further commented: "He's got with somebody else but he's unhappy because he realizes the new girl will never be me. She won't love him, and I was loyal. You got to deal with it."

== Chart performance ==
Released on June 29, 2006, "She Don't" debuted at number 62 on the US Hot R&B/Hip-Hop Songs chart in late July 2006. In September, over two months after the release, the song finally entered the top 20, peaking at number 17 on the chart. While the single was successful on the R&B charts, it failed to chart on the Billboard Hot 100. "She Don't," however, was able to reach number two on Billboard's Bubbling Under Hot 100 Singles.

== Music video ==
Luckett reteamed with Chris Robinson, director of the visuals for her previous single "Torn" (2006), to film a video for "She Don't" in Atlanta in the week of June 28, 2006. Rapper Slim Thug, Luckett's ex-boyfriend, appears in this video with role as her ex-boyfriend. It premiered on July 5, 2006 on BET's Access Granted and later peaked at number two on the networks's 106 & Park countdown. The video for "She Don't" was also included as an enhanced video in the Japanese Special edition of LeToya alongside "Torn".

At the start of the video Luckett arrives in a Lamborghini Gallardo. As the video progresses, Luckett direct herself away from her ex (played by Slim Thug), but then he follows her, after a brief conversation, she leaves the place, confusing his mind, then Luckett shows with dark outfit in a dark place, referring to his dreams. Then Slim Thug is seen driving a Cadillac with his current girlfriend, but it changes turning out to be Luckett. After this Luckett is shown in a bilinear gradient glass-field making sensual moves. Finally at the end of the video, all environments are shown in a lapse of time turning out to be only Slim Thug's dreams. He then gets out of bed, where his girlfriend is laying and calls up "Toya."

== Track listing ==
All tracks written by Walter "Lil' Walt" Milsap III, Candice Nelson, and Yvette Davis.

- U.S. 12-inch single
1. "She Don't" (Album version) – 4:08
2. "She Don't" (Instrumental) – 4:04
3. "She Don't" (Remix featuring Nas) – 4:05
4. "She Don't" (Remix Instrumental) – 4:05
5. "She Don't" (Remix Acapella) – 4:05
- U.S. CD promo
1. "She Don't" (Radio Edit) – 3:18
2. "She Don't" (Album version) – 4:08
3. "She Don't" (Instrumental) – 4:04

Sample credits

- "She Don't" features samples from The Spinners's "We Belong Together" (1973).

== Charts ==
=== Weekly charts ===
Weekly chart performance for "She Don't"
Chart (2006)	Peak position
US Bubbling Under Hot 100 Singles (Billboard)	2
US Hot R&B/Hip-Hop Songs (Billboard)	17
US Radio Songs (Billboard)	67

=== Year-end charts ===
Year-end chart performance for "She Don't"
Chart (2006)	Position
US Hot R&B/Hip-Hop Songs (Billboard)	99
