= Marcus Demps =

American football player (born 1983)

No. 36
- Position: Safety

Personal information
- Born: August 19, 1983 (age 43); Minot, North Dakota, U.S.
- Listed height: 6 ft 1 in (1.85 m)
- Listed weight: 198 lb (90 kg)

Career information
- High school: Highland (Palmdale, California)
- College: San Diego State
- NFL draft: 2006: undrafted

Career history
- Detroit Lions (2006)*
- * Offseason or practice squad member only

Awards and highlights
- First-team All-MW (2005)

Marcus L. Demps (born August 19, 1983) is an American former football safety who played college football at San Diego State.

He is the younger brother of safety Will Demps.

== Early life ==
Demps attended Highland High School in Palmdale, California. He was a two-year starter at strong safety. Demps was also a two-time all-Golden League selection. He was also named to the Antelope Valley Press second-team as a junior and first-team as a senior, despite missing three games with a foot injury. Demps was also selected to the all-Valley team by the Los Angeles Daily News. He earned a pair of varsity letters in track.

== College career ==
Demps attended San Diego State, where he majored in criminal justice.

=== Freshman (2001) ===
As a freshman in 2001, Demps was in the contention for playing time in the secondary before suffering a broken finger that required surgery early in the season. He ended up redshirting that season.

=== Red-shirt Freshman (2002) ===
In 2002, Demps played in nine games, primarily on special teams and at safety. He ended the season with 24 tackles, including a career-high 12 at Air Force when he had his first game his first career start against the Air Force. He had six tackles against Colorado State and two tackles against Utah.

=== Red-shirt Sophomore (2003) ===
In 2003, Demps started the season as a backup, but was promoted to the starting lineup when mononucleosis sidelined then starter Josh Dean. He however, returned to the sidelines due to an ankle injury that caused him to miss three games. For the season Demps was in the starting lineup in five games. Demps had a 13-tackle game at UTEP and eight tackles at UCLA. Despite missing three games, Demps finished fifth on the team with 39 tackles, (24 solo). He had a sack against Air Force and another tackle for a loss against UCLA. He recovered a fumble against UTEP. He was credited with a blocked punt against Eastern Washington.

=== Red-shirt Junior (2004) ===
In 2004, after two years at safety, Demps became a starting cornerback as a junior. He finished eighth on the team with 35 tackles. He broke up eight passes, caused a pair of fumbles (Idaho State and Utah) ranking him second on the team in that category. He had an interception and a pass broken up against #17 Michigan. Demps broke up three passes against Nevada. He had a season-high six tackles against Nevada and #9 Utah. Against Utah, Demps, also recorded a forced fumble. He finished 10th among Mountain West secondary players with nine passes defended. Thirty of his tackles were solo. However, he was slowed late in the year by a sprained knee but did not miss a game.

=== Red-shirt Senior (2005) ===
In 2005, Demps finished the season with 72 tackles, two sacks, four interceptions and one touchdown.

Demps opened the season with five tackles against UCLA, (three solo). The next game at Air Force, he recorded eight tackles (two solo, one for loss) and one forced fumble. During the third game of the season in Columbus, Ohio against Ohio State, Demps recorded nine tackles. In the next game, home against San Jose State he recorded two tackles (two solo, one for loss), his first interception of the season, and two passes defensed. Against BYU, Demps recorded two tackles (two solo, one for loss) and his second interceptions on the season. The next week at UNLV, he recorded six tackles (two solo, one for loss). During the next game at Utah, Demps recorded 10 tackles (four solo). The next week against New Mexico, Demps recorded a season-high of 12 tackles (10 solo). Against Texas Christian University, he recorded seven tackles (four solo, one for loss). In the game at Colorado State, Demps recorded seven tackles (three solo), one interception, and one passed defensed. In the game against Wyoming, he recorded one tackle (one solo, one for loss), one interception, and one punt return. In the season, and his college finale, against Hawaii, Demps recorded five tackles (two solo) and one pass defensed.

== Professional career ==
Demps went unselected in the 2006 NFL draft, however he was signed by the Detroit Lions as an undrafted free agent on May 8, 2006, after participating in the rookie mini-camp as a tryout player. He was released on September 2, 2006, and then signed to the Lions practice squad the next day. However, he was placed on the reserved/injury list on September 21, 2006, with a knee injury.

== Personal life ==
Demps is the son of Kye and William Demps and the younger brother of free agent safety Will Demps.
