= She Ain't Got... =

Single by LeToya

from the album Lady Love
- Released: June 1, 2009
- Length: 3:40
- Label: Capitol
- Songwriters: Cory Bold; Chris Brown; Luckett; Andre Merritt
- Producer: Cory Bold

LeToya Luckett singles chronology
"Not Anymore" (2009)	"She Ain't Got..." (2009)	"Regret" (2009)

"She Ain't Got..." is a song recorded by American singer LeToya Luckett. It was written by Luckett, Andre Merritt, Chris Brown and Cory Bold, while production was overseen by Bold. Merritt was credited as a vocal and co-producer, while Brown received a vocal producer credit. The song was released as the second single from her second studio album Lady Love (2009), on June 1, 2009, through Capitol Records.

== Chart performance ==
In the United States the song charted at number thirty-nine on the Billboard Rhythmic Top 40 chart.

On September 5, 2009, the song debuted at number forty-four on the Hot Dance Club Play charts. In its second week the song risen seven places and peaked at number thirty-seven. In its third week the song risen a further nine places and peaked at number twenty-eight. In its fourth week the song risen four places and peaked at number twenty-four. In its fifth week the song reached its peak at number twenty and remained for two consecutive weeks before falling to number twenty-four in its seventh week. The song spent a total of nine weeks on the Hot Dance Club Play before falling out of the top fifty at number forty-one on October 31, 2009.

== Music video ==
The music video was shot on June 3, 2009. It was directed by Bryan Barber. The video features guest star Major League Baseball players Orlando Hudson and Matt Kemp of the Los Angeles Dodgers and Baseball Hall of Fame member Dave Winfield. A clean version music video was released on EMI's YouTube channel on July 13, 2009 under the title "She Ain't Got... (Swing Batta, Batta)". She is seen accidentally finding out through a short text message in her love interest's (played by Sean Newman) cell phone that he is cheating on her. Then, she is shown involved in a heated argument with him at a crowded nightclub where she is tapped to make a performance. The video is particularly notable because it is the first music video by LeToya which features such a prominent dance routine.

== Track listing and formats ==
Explicit digital download
No.	Title	Length
1.	"She Ain't Got..."	3:43

Clean digital download
No.	Title	Length
1.	"She Ain't Got..."	3:42

Dance Remixes (EP)
No.	Title	Length
1.	"She Ain't Got... (Jason Nevins Radio Edit)"	3:26
2.	"She Ain't Got... (Dave Aude Club)"	7:38
3.	"She Ain't Got... (Dr. No vs. Mr. FU Club Edit)"	7:11
4.	"She Ain't Got... (Ruanne Emmenes Dirty Giraffe)"	7:15

Dave Audé Radio Edit
No.	Title	Length
1.	"She Ain't Got... (Dave Audé Radio Edit)"	3:52

== Charts ==
Chart performance for "She Ain't Got..."
Chart (2009)	Peak position
Japan (Japan Hot 100)	49
Netherlands (Urban Top 100)	12
US Dance Club Songs (Billboard)	20
US Pop 100 Airplay (Billboard)	75
US Rhythmic Airplay (Billboard)	39

== Release history ==
Release dates and formats for "She Ain't Got..."
Region	Date	Format	Version	Label	Ref.
United States	June 1, 2009	Digital download	Explicit	Capitol	
United Kingdom	June 1, 2009	Digital download	Explicit	Capitol	
United States	June 9, 2009	Mainstream radio / Rhythmic Crossover radio	Clean	Capitol	
United States	August 7, 2009	Dance Remixes - EP	Explicit	Capitol	
United Kingdom	August 7, 2009	Dance Remixes - EP	Explicit	Capitol	
United States	August 11, 2009	Dave Audé Radio Edit	Clean	Capitol	
United Kingdom	August 11, 2009	Dave Audé Radio Edit	Clean	Capitol	
