= Don't Make Me Wait (LeToya Luckett song) =

2014 song by LeToya Luckett

Promotional single by LeToya Luckett
- Released: February 11, 2014
- Genre: R&B
- Length: 2:07
- Label: eOne Music
- Songwriters: Andre Harris; LeToya Luckett; Joseph Edward Macklin; Darryl Farris; Louis John Macklin; Zaiki Morris; Juan Moore

LeToya Luckett chronology
"When I Had the Chance" (2011)	"Don't Make Me Wait" (2014)	"Back 2 Life" (2016)

"Don't Make Me Wait" is a song recorded by American singer LeToya Luckett. The song was written by Andre Harris, LeToya Luckett, Joseph Edward Macklin, Darryl Farris, Louis John Macklin, Zaiki Morris and Juan Moore. The song was released on February 11, 2014, by eOne Music Entertainment.

The song was included on the soundtrack for the film Lucky Girl which starred Luckett.

== Background ==
Luckett announced on her official website LeToya Online on February 4, 2014, "The wait is almost over! “Don’t Make Me Wait”, LeToya's new record inspired by the hit VH1 series, Single Ladies, will be featured on the February 10th episode of the show and available for download on February 11 via eOne Music!". In an interview Luckett spoke about the song stating "'Don't Make Me Wait’ is a song that I did with Single Ladies in mind. It's all about the chase! I'm excited to release my first single from my forthcoming album in a little bit, and until then, I wanted to give fans a taste of what I’ve been working on. Enjoy!"

== Critical reception ==
VH1 stated "You may know LeToya Luckett as an original member of Destiny’s Child, but she’s a multi-faceted star in her own right. The talented singer, actress and business owner joined the Single Ladies cast this season, bringing life to the fierce breed of music executives she knows all too well. In addition to playing Felicia Price, LeToya is contributing new music to the show’s third season while working on her third solo album. New single “Don’t Make Me Wait” (featured in the clip above) debuts on tonight's all-new episode.." Rap-Up stated "While she records her new album, LeToya Luckett holds fans over with “Don’t Make Me Wait.” The former Destiny's Child member tells her man to come and get it on the two-minute track, which was inspired by her role on VH1’s 'Single Ladies'." Rated RnB stated "After a four year hiatus, LeToya Luckett is back with new music. The original Destiny’s Child member has released her new song called “Don’t Make Me Wait” to hold fans over until she releases an official single." Vibe magazine stated "Letoya Luckett is taking it back to the mic. After a long musical hiatus, the “Single Ladies” star has returned with her new single, “Don’t Make Me Wait.” The subdued, laid-back track is a cut off her forthcoming Until Then album.".

Centric stated "It has been over five years since LeToya Luckett released her 2009 sophomore album, Lady Love, and in the years since she has been laying low---musically, of course---opting to focus on her acting career (aren't you loving her on VH1's Single Ladies?). Now, she's back to the business of music with the release of "Don't Make Me Wait"---oh, she got jokes. The song is meant has a "hold-over" track of sorts for fans that are still waiting on her third album, Until Then. Again, more jokes."

== Track listing ==
Digital download
No.	Title	Length
1.	"Don't Make Me Wait"	2:07

== Release history ==
Region	Date	Format	Label	Ref
Worldwide	February 11, 2014	Digital Download	eOne Music	

== Remix version ==
"Don't Make Me Wait (Remix)"

Promotional single by LeToya Luckett featuring T.I.
- Released: March 10, 2015
- Genre: R&B; hip hop
- Length: 3:58
- Label: eOne Music
- Songwriters: Andre Harris; LeToya Luckett; Joseph Edward Macklin; Darryl Farris; Louis John Macklin; Zaiki Morris; Juan Moore

LeToya Luckett chronology
"When I Had the Chance" (2011)	"Don't Make Me Wait (Remix)" (2015)	"Back 2 Life" (2016)

T.I. chronology
Private Show (2015)	Don't Make Me Wait (2015)	Project Steps (2015)

"Don't Make Me Wait" was remixed with a rap verse from American rapper T.I. and is an extended version of the original solo version of the song that was released (2014). The remix was released to iTunes worldwide on March 10, 2015.

=== Background ===
On March 6, 2015, the song was released to Entertainment One Music's SoundCloud. On March 18, Luckett announced on her website "LeToya has released the official remix to her Single Ladies inspired record, “Don’t Make Me Wait”! Featuring “The King” T.I., the song serves as a preview to her upcoming album Until Then set for release later this year! You can download the song NOW on iTunes, Google Play, and Amazon!" The audio video was also released on her YouTube channel.

=== Critical reception ===
Rap-Up praised T.I.'s contribution to the track "T.I. reigns on a remix to LeToya Luckett’s 'Don’t Make Me Wait.' On his opening verse, the King caters to his lady with some rapid-fire rhymes. The original song surfaced last February and was inspired by LeToya’s role as Felicia Price on VH1’s 'Single Ladies'." Singersroom described the song as a "shy girl's dating anthem".

The Boombox stated "Former Destiny’s Child member LeToya Luckett warns the fellas not to keep her waiting on the remix to her club-ready single, 'Don’t Make Me Wait'. Initially released in February of 2014, Luckett decided to give the track a new sheen by adding T.I. to the mix, resulting in a battle of the sexes-style banger. T.I. shines as he usually does on R&B collabos, lending his southern charm with lines like “‘Cause straight to the chase, know the king don’t play / And you the baddest thing that I seen all day / Got the itty-bitty waist and the face that I say / You’ll grace the front of a magazine one day.” Luckett provides her sultry vocals, purring, “You better come and get it, don’t make me wait.”

=== Track listing ===
Digital download
No.	Title	Length
1.	"Don't Make Me Wait" (featuring T.I.)	3:58

=== Release history ===
Region	Date	Format	Label	Ref
Various	March 10, 2015	Digital Download	eOne Music	
