= LeToya (album) =

Studio album by LeToya
- Released: July 25, 2006
- Length: 52:18
- Label: Capitol
- Producers: Terry "T. A." Allen; B-Don; Teddy Bishop; The CornaBoyz; Bryan-Michael Cox; Jermaine Dupri; Flash Technology; Gavo; Just Blaze; Lil Walt; Candice Nelson; Jazze Pha; J. R. Rotem; Scott Storch; Wine-O

LeToya chronology
LeToya (2006)	Lady Love (2009)

Singles from LeToya
- 1. "Torn" Released: March 21, 2006; 2. "She Don't" Released: June 29, 2006; 3. "Obvious" Released: November 21, 2006

Alternative cover
- Special edition cover

LeToya is the debut solo studio album by American R&B singer LeToya Luckett. It was released by Capitol Records on July 25, 2006. Luckett, who co-wrote nine of the album's 16 songs, worked with a variety of producers on the album, including Teddy Bishop, The CornaBoyz, Bryan-Michael Cox, Jermaine Dupri, Just Blaze, Lil Walt, Candice Nelson, Jazze Pha, J. R. Rotem, and Scott Storch. It marked her first solo project after her departure from girl groups Destiny's Child and Anjel.

The album garnered mostly positive reception from music critics, who found that it showed Luckett's individuality, while some called the project disjointed and generic. LeToya debuted at number one on the US Billboard 200, becoming the second Destiny's Child member after Beyoncé to debut at the top spot with her debut album, and was eventually certified Platinum by the RIAA in December 2006. The album spawned three singles: "Torn", "She Don't" and "Obvious". Besides the officially released singles, Luckett's debut album also includes the promo singles, "U Got What I Need" and "All Eyes On Me".

== Background ==
Luckett rose to fame in the late 1990s as a founding member of the R&B girl group Destiny's Child, one of the world's best-selling girl groups of all time. As a band member, she achieved four US Top 10 hit singles and won two Grammy Awards. In March 2000, she and former fellow group member LaTavia Roberson were ousted from the group after conflicts with the band's manager, Mathew Knowles. Luckett and Roberson subsequently filed lawsuits against their former manager and bandmates for breach of contract and defamation, which were settled out of court in 2002. After a prospective partnership with Roberson in a new girl group called Anjel fell through, Luckett and her mother established Lady Elle, a clothing and accessory boutique in Houston.

During a six-month stay in Los Angeles, Luckett visited modeling and acting agencies while recording demos that eventually secured her a recording deal with Capitol Records, under which Luckett began work on her solo debut album in 2004. Luckett worked with producers Scott Storch, Jazze Pha, Just Blaze and Jermaine Dupri on material for LeToya, while co-writing nine of the album's 16 songs.

== Promotion ==
The first promotional single from the album was "U Got What I Need", released with non-commercial purpose in 2004, while "All Eyes on Me", issued in 2005, served as another promotional single prior to the album's release. Selected as the album's "right urban lead single", "Torn" was released as the lead single from LeToya in October 2005. Released to strong airplay, it peaked at number 31 on the US Billboard Hot 100 chart, and became a hit on the US Hot R&B/Hip-Hop Songs chart, peaking at number two. It also entered the top twenty on the Rhythmic Top 40 and Adult R&B Songs charts. Second single "She Don't", produced by Walter Milsap III and Candice Nelson, was issued on February 21, 2006. Less successful, it became a top 20 hit on the Hot R&B/Hip-Hop Songs chart.

== Critical reception ==
Professional ratings
Review scores
Source	Rating
AllMusic	3.5/5 stars
The Guardian	3/5 stars
Now	2/5 Ns
Prefix	7/10 stars
Rolling Stone	2/5 stars
The Skinny	2/5 stars
SPIN	4/5 stars
Stylus Magazine	C−
The Phoenix	3/4 stars
Vibe	3/5 stars

The album garnered mostly positive reception from music critics. Prefix's Norman Mayers called LeToya an "excellent debut from an artist who was destined to become a footnote. The album is a classy affair of quality soul as well as a statement of Letoya's own individuality." Entertainment Weekly's Raymond Fiore found that "on her solo debut, the 25-year-old Houston native forgoes musical risk and lets hitmakers like Jermaine Dupri, Just Blaze, and Scott Storch ensure that almost every urban-radio formula – from a Southern club-rattler to a Mariah-like midtempo love jam – is represented on the self-titled Letoya. LeToya lacks Beyoncé-caliber pipes, but she’s got enough memorable tunes to make a surprisingly solid bid for solo stardom." AllMusic editor Anthony Tognazzini felt that the album's "polished, hip-hop-inflected R&B sound recalls Destiny's Child. LeToya gives the singer's former bandmate Beyoncé a run for her money." The Guardian's Caroline Sullivan noted that "there's almost nothing to dislike, such is its smartly coiffed cheeriness. This album has a voice of its own, nipping and tucking club tracks and slouchy love songs into a cohesive whole that reminds you Destiny's Child was a long time ago."

Michael Freedberg from The Phoenix found that "LeToya’s debut CD [...] has it all. Great songs, funky sexy songs, romantic songs, intense songs, gangsta-girl songs, fun and exotic songs, sexy dance music, a soulful version of regggaetón, and songs reminiscent of 1970s Philly soul. LeToya can sing; her voice hasn’t the luminescent high notes of Beyoncé, but she can riff a melody almost as forcefully as Mary J. Blige." On the contrary, Evan Serpick from Rolling Stone, wrote: "Unfortunately, on the disc her voice is lost in a sea of tepid R&B; arrangements and hip-hop hybrids. On about half the tracks, LeToya tries to position herself as a passionate emoter in the mold of Mary J. Blige [...] But LeToya's voice has neither the grit nor the exuberance to fill those shoes. On the album's other half, LeToya proves her hometown pride but loses the vibe by collaborating [...] on a series of underbaked, disjointed club tracks." Vibe editor Tiffany McGee felt that "at times so-so songwriting overstates monotonous find-love/lose-love plotlines, and the production occasionally overwhelms her feisty, yet not forceful falsetto. But Mike Jones, Slim Thug, and Paul Wall liven up the set as LeToya finally fulfills her destiny as a solo songbird." Now critic Jason Richards called LeToya a "really boring solo disc" as well as "a wellspring of clichés", while Wendy Martin from The Skinny summed the project as a "slickly produced album [with] good backing singers, and a selection of male rappers. The result? Twelve tracks that all sound the same."

== Commercial performance ==
Initially scheduled for a 2005 release, LeToya was released on July 19, 2006, in Japan and on July 25, 2006, in the United States. The album debuted at number one on the US Billboard 200 and the Billboard Top R&B/Hip-Hop Albums chart, with first week sales of 165,000 copies. On August 31, 2006, it was certified Gold by the Recording Industry Association of America (RIAA) and Platinum on December 11, 2006. By November 2008, the album had sold 529,000 copies in the US.

== Track listing ==
LeToya track listing
No.	Title	Writer(s)	Producer(s)	Length
1.	"Intro"	Gavin Luckett; Brandon Pitre	Gavo; B-Don	0:56
2.	"U Got What I Need"	LeToya Luckett; Justin Smith; David Young; Barry White	Just Blaze	3:45
3.	"So Special"	L. Luckett; Teddy Bishop; Tamara Savage; Young	Bishop	3:30
4.	"Torn"	L. Luckett; Bishop; Young; Thom Bell; Linda Epstein	Bishop	4:22
5.	"What Love Can Do"	Keri Hilson; Pierre Medor; Dwayne Nesmith; Patrick "J. Que" Smith	The CornaBoyz	3:47
6.	"She Don't"	Walter "Lil' Walt" Milsap III; Candice Nelson; Yvette Davis	Milsap; Nelson	4:04
7.	"Tear da Club Up (H-Town Version)" (featuring Bun B & Jazze Pha)	L. Luckett; Phalon Alexander; Bernard Freeman; Kayla Shelton; Young	Wine-O; Jazze Pha^{[a]}	3:49
8.	"All Eyes on Me" (featuring Paul Wall)	L. Luckett; Jonathan Rotem; Paul Slayton; Young	J. R. Rotem	3:34
9.	"Hey Fella" (featuring Slim Thug)	H. Lang Jr.; Stayve Thomas; Young	Flash Technology	3:53
10.	"Gangsta Grillz" (featuring Mike Jones & Killa Kyleon)	L. Luckett; Terry "T. A." Allen; Shannon Graham; Jones; Kyle Riley; Shelton	Allen	3:50
11.	"Obvious"	L. Luckett; Bryan Michael Cox; Young	Cox; Young^{[b]}	3:55
12.	"I'm Good"	L. Luckett; Makeba Riddick; Scott Storch; Robert Waller	Storch	3:24
13.	"This Song"	Cox; Jermaine Dupri; Johnta Austin	Dupri; Cox^{[c]}	3:16
14.	"Outro"	L. Luckett; Gregory G. Curtis; G. Luckett; Luckett; Pitre	Gavo; B-Don	1:37
15.	"Torn (So So Def Remix)" (featuring Mike Jones & Rick Ross) (bonus track)	L. Luckett; Bishop; Young; Bell; Epstein; Jones; William Roberts	Dupri; LRoc^{[c]}	4:35

iTunes Store bonus track and Target bonus download
No.	Title	Writer(s)	Producer(s)	Length
16.	"No More"	L. Luckett; Millsap; Nelson	Millsap; Nelson	4:06

Enhanced CD bonus content (North America and Europe)
No.	Title	Length
16.	"A Day in the Life of LeToya" (enhanced video)
17.	"Torn" (music video)	4:43

Japan Special Edition enhanced bonus content
No.	Title	Length
16.	"Torn" (music video)	4:43
17.	"She Don't" (music video)	4:27
18.	"LeToya in Japan" (special footage)	7:00

Notes

- ^{^[a]} denotes original producer(s)
- ^{^[b]} denotes additional vocal producer(s)
- ^{^[c]} denotes co-producer(s)

Sample credits

- "U Got What I Need" contains a sample of Love Unlimited's "Walkin' in the Rain with the One I Love" (1972).
- "Torn" contains elements of The Stylistics's "You Are Everything" (1971).
- "She Don't" features samples from The Spinners's "We Belong Together" (1973).
- "Outro" contains elements of "Just a Prayer" (1991) by Yolanda Adams.

== Personnel ==
- Executive producers: LeToya Luckett; Carl "Mister C" Cole; Terry Ross
- Mixing: Manny Marroquin (tracks 1, 6, 8–12, 14); Dave Russell (5); Kevin "KD" Davis (7); Jean-Marie Horvat (2, 3, 4); Jermaine Dupri (13, 15); Phil Tan (13, 15); Josh Houghkirk (assistant – 15)
- Recording Engineers: Phil Tan (track 15); Jermaine Dupri (15); Danny Cheung (1, 3, 4, 7, 8, 9, 14, additional music – 2, 11, 12), Walter Millsap (additional music – 6), Dave Lopez (6); Terrence Cash (10), Dave Ashton (8); Ryan West (2), Tadd Mingo (assistant – 15); Pierre Medor of Tha Corna Boys (5); Sam Thomas (11); Leslie Brathwaite (7); John Horesco IV (13, 15); Conrad Golding (12)
- Additional vocals from: Candice Nelson (additional background vocals- 6); Dave Young (additional vocals- 11)
- Art directions: Eric Roinestad
- Design: Eric Roinestad
- Photography: Dusan Reljin

== Charts ==
=== Weekly charts ===
Weekly chart performance for LeToya
Chart (2006)	Peak position
Japanese Albums (Oricon)	37
UK R&B Albums (Official Charts)	39
US Billboard 200	1
US Top R&B/Hip-Hop Albums (Billboard)	1

=== Year-end charts ===
Year-end chart performance for LeToya
Chart (2006)	Position
US Billboard 200	138
US Top R&B/Hip-Hop Albums (Billboard)	26

== Certifications ==
Certifications for LeToya
Region	Certification	Certified units/sales
United States (RIAA)	Platinum	1,000,000^{^}
^{^} Shipments figures based on certification alone.

== Release history ==
Release dates and formats for LeToya
Region	Date	Edition(s)	Format(s)	Label
Japan	July 19, 2006	Standard	CD; digital download	EMI Japan
United States	July 25, 2006	Standard	CD; digital download	Capitol
Canada	August 15, 2006	Standard	CD; digital download	EMI Music
Australia	September 16, 2006	Standard	CD; digital download	EMI Music
Europe	October 2, 2006	Standard	CD; digital download	EMI Music
Puerto Rico	December 24, 2006	Standard	CD; digital download	EMI Music
Japan	February 7, 2007	Special	CD; digital download	EMI Japan
