= LeToya Luckett =

American singer and actress (born 1981)

- Luckett in 2024
- Born: LeToya Nicole Luckett; March 11, 1981 (age 45); Houston, Texas, U.S.
- Other name: LeToya Luckett-Walker
- Occupations: Singer; actress
- Years active: 1993–present
- Spouses: Rob Hill Sr (m. 2016; div. 2016) Tommicus Walker (m. 2017; div. 2021) Taleo Coles (m. 2024)
- Children: 2
- Musical career
- Genre: R&B
- Labels: Columbia; Capitol; eOne Music
- Formerly of: Destiny's Child

LeToya Nicole Luckett-Coles (nee; Luckett, born March 11, 1981) is an American R&B singer and actress. She rose to fame in the late 1990s as a founding member of the R&B girl group Destiny's Child, one of the world's best-selling girl groups of all time. As a member of Destiny's Child, she achieved four US Top 10 hit singles, "No, No, No", "Bills, Bills, Bills", "Jumpin', Jumpin'", and "Say My Name", sold over 25 million records, and won two Grammy Awards. In the 2000s, she began her solo career after leaving the group and signing a record deal with Capitol Records.

Her solo debut album, LeToya (2006), debuted at number-one on the U.S. Billboard 200 chart, and was certified platinum by the RIAA, that same year. The lead single, "Torn", reached the Top 40 in the U.S., and set records on BET's top ten countdown show 106 & Park. Luckett was awarded Top Songwriter at the 2006 ASCAP Rhythm and Soul Awards. Luckett's second solo album, Lady Love (2009), debuted at number-one on the U.S. Top R&B/Hip-Hop Albums chart. The album included the Tank co-penned single "Regret" featuring rapper Ludacris. She returned to music in 2017, releasing her third studio album, Back 2 Life, which entered the Billboard 200 and marked her first independent release.

As an actress, Luckett made an appearance in the 2010 feature film Killers. That same year, she portrayed Angie in the film Preacher's Kid. She later acted alongside Taraji P. Henson in the independent film From the Rough (2011), while subsequently appearing on the second season of the HBO drama series Treme (2011–2012). Luckett has starred in several television series, including the VH1 comedy-drama Single Ladies (2014–2015), the OWN drama Greenleaf (2017–2020), and the Starz crime drama Power Book III: Raising Kanan (2022). She also executive-produced and starred in the BET+ drama series Divorced Sistas (2025-Present) by Tyler Perry.

== Early life ==
LeToya Nicole Luckett was born on March 11, 1981, in Houston, Texas, to Pamela and Darrell Luckett. She is the older of two children, with a younger brother named Gavin. She grew up singing in her local Brentwood Baptist Church. She also took vocal lessons to become an opera singer. Her father, who was also a singer, was very proud of his daughter's vocal talents and tried to get her in the music business. Luckett was given the chance to sing her first solo at the age of five. "The lady just gave me the mic one Sunday and I sang," she recalled. Shortly thereafter, she joined the children's choir and began performing in plays at her elementary school. One day, she walked to her desk in class to find a girl sitting there. Luckett asked her teacher to remove the girl, Beyoncé Knowles, from her assigned seat. They later became friends and Luckett was invited to join Beyoncé's singing group Girl's Tyme, which later became Destiny's Child.

== Career ==
=== 1993–2000: Destiny's Child and departure ===
In 1993, Luckett joined Beyoncé Knowles, LaTavia Roberson, and Kelly Rowland to complete the Houston-based R&B group, Destiny's Child. The roles of the group consisted of Knowles as lead vocalist, Rowland as second-lead vocalist alongside Roberson and Luckett as background vocalists with Roberson as alto (and spokesperson) adding the low notes and Luckett as the soprano adding the high notes to the group's harmony, with occasional leads too. After being signed and later dropped by Elektra Records in 1995, the group began working with D'wayne Wiggins and eventually signed with Columbia Records in 1997, but not before signing with group manager Mathew Knowles, Beyoncé's father. According to the E! Television Special, Boulevard of Broken Dreams, Mathew forced the girls to sign management agreements with him before they could sign with the label. Luckett's mother requested the contracts be reviewed by an attorney, but Mathew denied this request. However, Luckett eventually signed with him and joined the group. After graduating from the Houston club scene, the group opened for established acts such as Dru Hill, SWV, and Immature, was included on the Men in Black movie soundtrack, and released their 1998 self-titled debut album Destiny's Child. The album spawned two singles: the platinum "No, No, No Part II" (featuring Wyclef Jean) and "With Me". Subsequently, the group made it on the soundtrack album of the romantic drama Why Do Fools Fall in Love with the song "Get on the Bus" (featuring Timbaland), and later toured as an opening act on TLC's "Fanmail Tour".

In 1999, the group released their second album, The Writing's on the Wall. The album became one of the biggest selling albums released by a female group, and was certified eight times platinum in the USA. As opposed to the first album, Luckett had more contribution to the second album in terms of co-writing. The album spawned four hit singles: "Bills, Bills, Bills", "Bug a Boo", "Say My Name", and "Jumpin' Jumpin'". The two singles "Bills, Bills, Bills" and "Say My Name" were also nominated for Grammy awards, which "Say My Name" won in two different categories. The album had also been released in a "Houston Special Edition" which included a bonus track, where Luckett sung lead along with the other members, titled "Can't Help Myself".

In late 1999, in the midst of the group's success and rise, Luckett and Roberson asserted that they wanted their own manager because of the increasing lack of communication with manager Mathew Knowles. The pair said they never wanted to fire Knowles, but wanted to secure outside management to represent them. Soon after, Luckett and Roberson found themselves ostracized by the Knowles family and the group's management. When the music video for "Say My Name" debuted in February 2000, they were replaced by two new members, Michelle Williams and Farrah Franklin. Luckett and Roberson filed a lawsuit against Mathew, Beyoncé, and Kelly, charging them with breach of partnership and fiduciary duties, and sought unspecified damages. Luckett and Roberson withdrew the case against Beyoncé and Kelly, but continued to sue Mathew. The case was eventually settled, with Luckett and Roberson receiving royalties for their contributions as founding members of the group. Shortly following the release of Destiny's Child's Survivor, Luckett and Roberson filed another lawsuit against the group in March 2002. They claimed that the album's lead single, "Survivor", violated their previous settlement due to its lyrics. The case was again settled out of court.

=== 2001–2008: Solo debut, LeToya ===
After several months of media speculation, it was announced via the MTV News website that Luckett and Roberson had created a new group called Anjel. After several auditions, Naty Quinones and Tiffany Beaudoin were selected as members. The group recorded a 22-song demo in Atlanta, Georgia, with the help of R&B group Jagged Edge. The group also appeared in Jagged Edge's video for "Where the Party At (Remix)". However, the production company (581 Entertainment) which handled the group collapsed and all the members of Anjel went on to pursue solo projects. The recorded tracks were later leaked onto the Internet.

After the Anjel project fell through, Luckett joined with Noontime, an Atlanta-based management/production company. Along with Noontime, she recorded a five-song demo and eventually signed with Capitol Records in 2003. Soon after, she began working on her debut solo album. The first promotional song, "You Got What I Need", was released in 2004, followed next year by "All Eyes on Me". She was featured on "My Promise" with her label mate Houston on his debut album It's Already Written, "What Love Can Do" on the Coach Carter soundtrack, and on "This Is My Life" with former boyfriend and rapper Slim Thug on his album Already Platinum. LeToya's self-titled debut album was released in July 2006 and debuted at number one on the U.S. Billboard 200 and Top R&B/Hip-Hop Albums charts. LeToya was certified gold after one month and by December 2006, the album had been certified platinum. Luckett and Beyoncé Knowles are the only members of Destiny's Child to have an album debut at number one on the Billboard 200 and achieve platinum status in the U.S.

The album is a hip-hop inspired R&B production. Producers included Jermaine Dupri, Scott Storch, Teddy Bishop, B. Cox, and musical guests Slim Thug, Mike Jones, Paul Wall, and Bun B. "All Eyes on Me" was originally chosen as Luckett's debut single, but "Torn" was ultimately selected instead. The ballad (produced by Teddy Bishop) was released in March 2006 and became an R&B hit. The song climbed the Billboard charts, peaking at number two on the Hot R&B/Hip-Hop Songs.

"Torn" (2006)
LeToya's most successful single to date.

Although Torn was still receiving airplay, her second single, "She Don't" was released to radio, and the video premiered on BET's Access Granted in July 2006, featuring Slim Thug. The single received moderate success, reaching number 17 on the Hot R&B/Hip-Hop chart. In November 2006, "Obvious" was selected as the third single. According to Billboard, the song had a 94% chance of becoming a hit, but due to the merger of Capitol Records and Virgin Records, all promotional money was frozen, therefore the single was never officially released. Luckett was also named "One of the Best New Artists of 2006" by AOL Music, number two on Rap-Up magazines' "Top 5 Breakthrough Artists of 2006," and received multiple nominations from the NAACP, the Soul Train Music Awards, and the Teen Choice Awards. BET promoted Luckett on 106 & Park, The Center, The Black Carpet, and with a three-part reality series special called The H-Town Chick which aired from May to July 2006. The series chronicled Luckett's experiences during her summer promotional tour and insight about her life since Destiny's Child. BET also hosted a contest that gave fans the opportunity to decide the final outcome of the "Torn" video. Cingular hosted a lip-sync contest that awarded those who best performed "Torn" in an online submitted video. In addition to a nationwide radio tour, club performances, a brief European and Asian appearances, Luckett participated in the 2006 "Pantene Total You" Tour, the "Cingular Live in Concert" series, and was invited by Mary J. Blige to join her summer tour, The Breakthrough Experience Tour, as her opening act.

In July 2006, while opening for a Mary J. Blige concert, Luckett announced that her upcoming album would be titled Lady Love; she then introduced and performed two new songs "Lady Love" and "Don't Let Me Get Away". On December 10, 2007, a buzz track, Swagger, that features rappers such as Slim Thug, Killa Kyleon and Bun B leaked onto the Internet. In 2008, Luckett was featured on Webbie's single "I Miss You" which was a moderate success.

=== 2009–2013: Lady Love ===
Luckett's second solo studio album was released on August 25, 2009. Production for Lady Love originally began in 2007, with a release scheduled several times in 2008. This was postponed due to lack of funding related to the Capitol Records and Virgin Records merger that had earlier affected the release of her third single "Obvious". In early 2009, the release date for Lady Love was announced to be May 19, 2009, then pushed to June 16, and finally set to August 25, 2009. Amidst much anticipation for the album release, Luckett released a five-track sampler on May 19, 2009. The sampler features first single "Not Anymore" and 1 minute 30-second snippets of "Regret", "She Ain't Got...", "Lady Love" and "Matter". The album was released to CD and music download on August 25, 2009, in the US and worldwide a day earlier. An explicit version of the album (bearing a Parental Advisory label) was also made available. To celebrate the album's release, LeToya hosted an album-release party at Cain in New York City on August 27, 2009. "Not Anymore", the lead single, was produced by Bei Maejor and co-produced and written by Ne-Yo. Released in February 2009, it became the most added song at urban radio, debuting at number ninety-eight on the US Billboard Hot R&B/Hip-Hop Songs chart before peaking at number eighteen and just missing the US Billboard Hot 100 singles chart, peaking at number 107. A music video for the single was shot on February 13, 2009. Directed by Bryan Barber, the music video is set in the 1960s and is split into three sections/time periods – 1961, 1964 and 1968. The sets, costumes and props change accordingly in each section to show the trends, fashions and styles of those particular years.

The video was released on March 10, 2009, and peaked at number three on the 106 & Park video countdown. "She Ain't Got..." the album's second single, was produced by Cory Bold and written by LeToya, Andre Merritt, Chris Brown and Bold. Chosen by fans, it became the first LeToya single to carry a Parental Advisory label, though a "clean" version was also released. It became the most added song on rhythmic radio, peaking at number thirty-nine on the Billboard Rhythmic Top 40 chart, while peaking at number seventy-five on the Billboard Pop 100 Airplay chart and number twenty on the Billboard Hot Dance Club Play. However, the single was most successful in Japan where it peaked at number forty-nine on the Japan Hot 100. A music video, directed by Bryan Barber, was shot on June 3, 2009 and premiered on Yahoo Music on June 30, 2009, featuring guest star Major League Baseball players Orlando Hudson and Matt Kemp of the Los Angeles Dodgers, as well as Baseball Hall of Fame member Dave Winfield. "Regret", featuring rapper Ludacris, was produced by Tank and Jerry "Texx" Franklin and written by Tank, LeToya, Franklin, K. Stephens, J. Valentine, R. Newt and C. Bridges. Released as the third single – based only on downloads and airplay – "Regret" peaked at number eight on the US Billboard Hot R&B/Hip-Hop Songs chart and debuted at number one-hundred on the Billboard Hot 100, making it LeToya's first single since her debut; "Torn", to enter the US Hot 100, peaking at number seventy-eight. It also peaked at number forty-two on the Billboard Radio Songs chart and was listed at number six on AOL Music's "Top R&B Songs of 2009" list. The music video for "Regret" was premiered on BET's 106 & Park on November 11, 2009, before later being ranked at number twenty-three on their BET: Notarized: Top 100 Videos of 2009 countdown. "Good To Me", produced by Tank and Jerry "Texx" Franklin and written by Tank, Franklin, K. Stephens, R. Newt and J. Valentine, was released as the album's fourth and final single on February 1, 2010. Though the song failed to chart, a music video directed by makeup artist AJ Crimson and co-starring model-actor Keston Karter was released on February 11, 2010.

=== 2014–present: Back 2 Life and planned fourth studio album ===
In January 2014, Luckett announced the title of her third studio album Until Then on The Wendy Williams Show, with a planned 2016 release.

On February 11, 2014, she released the promotional single "Don't Make Me Wait". A remix featuring rapper T.I. was released on March 10, 2015. On January 5, 2015, Luckett released a track "I'm Ready" on her YouTube channel. On January 16, 2015, Luckett, inspired to end illegal gun violence in America, released "Together" in partnership with the Caliber Foundation.

On December 7, 2016, she released the single "Back 2 Life", with an accompanying music video released on January 10, 2017. On April 10, 2017, Luckett posted on her Twitter page that her third studio album would be released on May 12, 2017, with the album title changing from Until Then to Back 2 Life. On April 17, 2017, "Used To", a second single from the album, was released.

== Acting career ==
Luckett's first role on television was on the WB show Smart Guy in 1998 with Destiny's Child. She also had an appearance in the 1999 movie Beverly Hood. She has been a student at Tasha Smith's acting workshop. Since 2008, Luckett has been acting in plays, television and movies. She was cast in JD Lawrence's stage play Rumors, as the character Michelle, and hit the road from January 31, 2008, to March 2, 2008. Luckett was also the star of the movie Preacher's Kid, released in January 2010.

Luckett appeared in the movie Killers, released on June 4, 2010, along with Ashton Kutcher, Katherine Heigl, Tom Selleck and Usher. She then finished shooting the 2011 movie From the Rough, alongside Taraji P. Henson and Tom Felton. For the second season, Luckett was cast in the HBO drama series Treme. In 2013, Luckett landed a recurring role on the VH1 television series Single Ladies. In 2015, she was cast in the first season of the HBO series Ballers, before landing a recurring role in the second season of Rosewood the next year. In 2017, Luckett began playing a recurring role on the OWN TV series Greenleaf.

In June 2021, Luckett was cast as Leah Franklin Dupont on the short-lived Fox series Our Kind of People; the role was later recast prior to the show airing. In 2022 and 2023, she starred in television movies for OWN, Lifetime and BET, respectively: The Great Holiday Bake War, Line Sisters and A Miracle Before Christmas. In 2022, she was also cast as Kenya Pierce (Jukebox's mother and Marvin's ex who left the family to make it as a professional singer in Los Angeles) in the second season of Power Book III: Raising Kanan.

In 2024, she starred in the BET thriller One Night Stay. On May 5, 2025, it was announced that Luckett would star as Rasheda in the BET+ ordered Divorced Sistas (a spin-off series from Sistas), which follows five close friends as they navigate life, love and the challenges that come with divorce, marriage and dating.

== Webisodes ==
Luckett has had two web series of herself on YouTube. In 2006, she did H-Town Chick; and in 2012, she did Life, Love & Music.

=== 2006: H-Town Chick ===
A three-episode series on YouTube featuring the singer explaining her role in Destiny's Child and discussing her first self-titled album LeToya.

=== 2012: Life, Love and Music ===
A six-episode series on YouTube giving an inside look at the singer's life and the recording process of her third album.

== Personal life ==
=== Relationships ===
In 2015, Luckett and motivational speaker Rob Hill Sr. got engaged, after a year of dating, and secretly wed in January 2016. They divorced after two months of marriage.

In August 2017, Luckett announced her engagement to entrepreneur Tommicus Walker. They were married in a lavish ceremony at Villa Antonia in Austin, Texas, on December 10, 2017. They have two children together, a daughter and a son. On January 11, 2021, the couple announced their divorce. Luckett confirmed that she and Walker were no longer married in July 2021.

In 2022, Luckett began dating entrepreneur Taleo Coles, whom she married on July 27, 2024, in Houston, Texas.

=== Endorsements ===
In 2010, Luckett became the new face of Luster's Hair Care replacing Karyn White. She appeared on the product line's boxes, billboards and commercials.

=== Lady Elle Boutique ===
In 2003, Luckett became the owner of Lady Elle Boutique, an upscale women's boutique. She originally opened this clothing boutique in the Uptown Park shopping center in her hometown of Houston, Texas as Lady L Boutique but later renamed it to Lady Elle Boutique. In 2008, the singer opened the store's second location in The Galleria in Houston.

=== Philanthropy ===
After the release of her first solo album, Luckett became involved in philanthropic activity. She has participated in various events like the "Women in Entertainment Empowerment Summit". She was also part of the national tour of the "Hip-Hop Summit Action Network 'Get Your Money Right' a Financial Empowerment Summit."

She visits schools to motivate and encourage children to study and to further their education after graduation. She also speaks on the subject of violence and domestic abuse.

== Discography ==
- LeToya (2006)
- Lady Love (2009)
- Back 2 Life (2017)

== Filmography ==
=== Film ===
Year	Title	Role	Notes
1999	Beverly Hood	Girl #3	
2010	Preacher's Kid	Angie King	
2010	Killers	Amanda	
2012	Note to Self	Paula Whittaker	
2014	From the Rough	Stacey	
2014	Where's the Love?	Rose	TV movie
2014	Heavenly Match	Reverend LaRonda "Ronnie" Mason	TV movie
2014	Drumline: A New Beat	Dr. Nia Phillips	TV movie
2014	Seasons of Love	Kyla Morris	TV movie
2015	Love Is a Four-Letter Word	Tandi	TV movie
2015	Lucky Girl	Selena Jackson	
2016	Addicted to You	Indigo Brown	TV movie
2018	Down For Whatever	Tracy	TV movie
2018	Rosalind	Phoebe	Short
2019	All the Way with You	Andrea	
2020	Until We Meet Again	Tiffany	
2021	Lust: A Seven Deadly Sins Story	-	TV movie
2022	Line Sisters	Valerie	TV movie
2022	The Great Holiday Bake War	Brianna	TV movie
2022	A Miracle Before Christmas	Mercedes Wright	TV movie
2023	Renaissance: A Film by Beyoncé	Herself	Cameo
2024	One Night Stay	Milan	TV Movie
2024	I Thought My Husband's Wife Was Dead	Vikki	TV Movie
2026	The Millwood Murders: Buried Truth	Shenae Griffiths	TV Movie
TBA	Dionne	Dionne Warwick	

=== Television ===
Year	Title	Role	Notes
1998	Smart Guy	Herself	Episode: "A Date With Destiny"
1999	Pacific Blue	Herself	Episode: "Ghost Town"
2004	Liquid Assets	Herself	Episode: "Beyonce's Millions"
2006	Soul Train	Herself	Episode: "Donell Jones/Le Toya Luckett"
2007	Blvd. of Broken Dreams	Herself	Episode: "Destiny's Child/Jonathan Brandis"
2011–12	Treme	Alison Myers	Recurring Cast: Seasons 2–3
2012–13	For Richer or Poorer	Kya Wilson	Main Cast
2013	Second Generation Wayans	Rochelle	Recurring Cast
2013	Regular Show	Jennifer	Episode: "The Thanksgiving Special"
2014–15	Single Ladies	Felicia Price	Main Cast: Seasons 3–4
2015	Ballers	Tina	Recurring Cast: Season 1
2015	Truth Be Told	Charlene	Episode: "The Wedding"
2016	Here We Go Again	Maddy Walker	Main Cast
2016	Real Husbands of Hollywood	Herself	Episode: "Fifty Shades of Brown"
2016–17	Rosewood	Tawnya	Recurring Cast: Season 2
2017	Hip Hop Squares	Herself/Contestant	Episode: "Jazmyn Simon vs LeToya Luckett"
2017	Face Value	Herself	Episode: "Loni Love Vs. LeToya Luckett"
2017–19	Black Music Honors	Herself/Co-Host	Main Co-Host
2017–20	Greenleaf	Rochelle Cross	Recurring Cast: Seasons 2 & 5, Main Cast: Season 3
2018	Unsolved	Sharitha Golden	Episode: "Wherever It Leads"
2018–21	T.I. & Tiny: Friends & Family Hustle	Herself	Main Cast: Seasons 1–3
2019	Black Love	Herself	Recurring Cast: Season 3
2021	Celebrity Stash	Herself	Episode: "LeToya Luckett Takes Us on A Trip Down Memory Lane"
2022	Power Book III: Raising Kanan	Kenya Pierce	Recurring Cast: Season 2
2022–23	Black Music Honors	Herself/Co-Host	Main Co-Host
2025–present	Divorced Sistas	Rasheda	Main Cast (Also An Exec. Producer)
