= Torn (LeToya song) =

Single by LeToya

from the album LeToya
- Released: March 21, 2006
- Recorded: November 30, 2005
- Length: 4:22
- Label: Capitol
- Songwriters: LeToya Luckett; Teddy Bishop; Dave Young; Thom Bell; Linda Epstein
- Producer: Teddy Bishop

LeToya singles chronology
"All Eyes on Me" (2005)	"Torn" (2006)	"She Don't" (2006)

"Torn" a song by American R&B singer LeToya Luckett. It was written by Luckett, Teddy Bishop, and Dave Young for her solo debut album LeToya (2006), while production was helmed by Bishop. The song contains elements and features samples from The Stylistics' "You Are Everything" (1971). Due to the inclusion of the sample, Thom Bell and Linda Epstein received credit as songwriters. Lyrically, "Torn" is about the protagonist being "torn" between staying with or leaving her lover.

Released as the album's lead single in March 2006, "Torn" became a hit on the US Hot R&B/Hip-Hop Songs chart, peaking at number two, and reached the top twenty on both the Rhythmic Top 40 and Adult R&B Songs charts. Aside from peaking at number 31 on the US Billboard Hot 100, it reached top forty in New Zealand and the United Kingdom. A music video for "Torn" was directed by Chris Robinson and co-stars American football safety Will Demps as Luckett's love interest.

== Background ==
"Torn" was written by Luckett, Teddy Bishop, and Dave Young. Commenting on the creation process of the song, Bishop said in 2012: "That song just kind of came about where LeToya had called me and asked me to put together some tracks for her. I went in the studio and I started coming up with different tracks. I had ideas of her doing something a little bit older. I dug in my crates and pulled out an old Stylistics record. Now Mary J. Blige had already did that particular sample previously, so I just did some different things to it. I flipped it and played live music and piano across it and gave it a different feel."

== Music video ==
A music video for "Torn" was directed by Chris Robinson and debuted on BET Access Granted on July 5, 2006. American football safety Will Demps co-stars as Luckett's love interest. The clip had one of its biggest successes on the network's music video countdown show 106 & Park where it reached number one in eleven days and stayed there for twenty-five days straight, eventually remaining on the countdown for sixty-five days. The visuals are featured as an enhanced video on the European edition and the Japanese special edition of the LeToya album.

== Remixes ==
Producer Jermaine Dupri and frequent collaborator LRoc were consulted to produce a remix for "Torn." Their "So So Def Remix" features guest appearances from rappers Mike Jones and Rick Ross. The album version is also slightly different from the single version and there is also a version with rapper Short Dogg and Dave Young, co-writer of "Torn," singing along with Luckett.

== Track listing ==
- U.S. 12-inch single
1. "Torn" (Album version)
2. "Torn" (Instrumental)
3. "Torn" (A Cappella)
4. "Tear Da Club Up" (Album version)
5. "Tear Da Club Up" (Wine-O Mix)
6. "Tear Da Club Up" (Instrumental)
7. "Tear Da Club Up" (Wine-O Mix instrumental)
- U.S. 12-inch single (Remix)
1. "Torn" (So So Def remix)
2. "Torn" (So So Def remix) (Instrumental)
3. "Torn" (So So Def remix)
4. "Torn" (So So Def remix) (Instrumental)
- Australia CD single
1. "Torn" (Radio edit) – 4:11
2. "Torn" (So So Def remix) – 4:36
3. "Torn" (Instrumental) – 4:21
- U.K. CD single 1
1. "Torn" (Radio edit) – 4:11
2. "Torn" (So So Def remix) – 4:36
- U.K. CD single 2 (Enhanced)
1. "Torn" (Radio edit) – 4:11
2. "Torn" (So So Def remix) – 4:36
3. "All Eyes On Me" – 3:34
4. "No More" – 4:08
5. "Torn" (Enhanced music video) – 4:37

NOTE: The So So Def remix features Mike Jones and Rick Ross.

== Charts ==
=== Weekly charts ===
Weekly chart performance for "Torn"
Chart (2006)	Peak position
Australia (ARIA)	44
Australian Urban (ARIA)	13
New Zealand (Recorded Music NZ)	28
Scotland Singles (OCC)	16
UK Singles (OCC)	35
UK Hip Hop/R&B (OCC)	12
US Billboard Hot 100	31
US Hot R&B/Hip-Hop Songs (Billboard)	2
US Pop 100 (Billboard)	90
US Rhythmic Airplay (Billboard)	15

=== Year-end charts ===
Year-end chart performance for "Torn"
Chart (2006)	Position
US Hot R&B/Hip-Hop Songs (Billboard)	12

== Release history ==
Release dates and formats for "Torn"
Region	Date	Format(s)	Label
United States	March 21, 2006	CD single; download	Capitol
Canada	April 15, 2006	CD single; download	Capitol
United States	July 18, 2006	Contemporary hit radio	Capitol
Australia	September 2, 2006	CD single; download	Capitol
United Kingdom	September 25, 2006	CD single; download	Capitol
