= Deborah Cox discography =

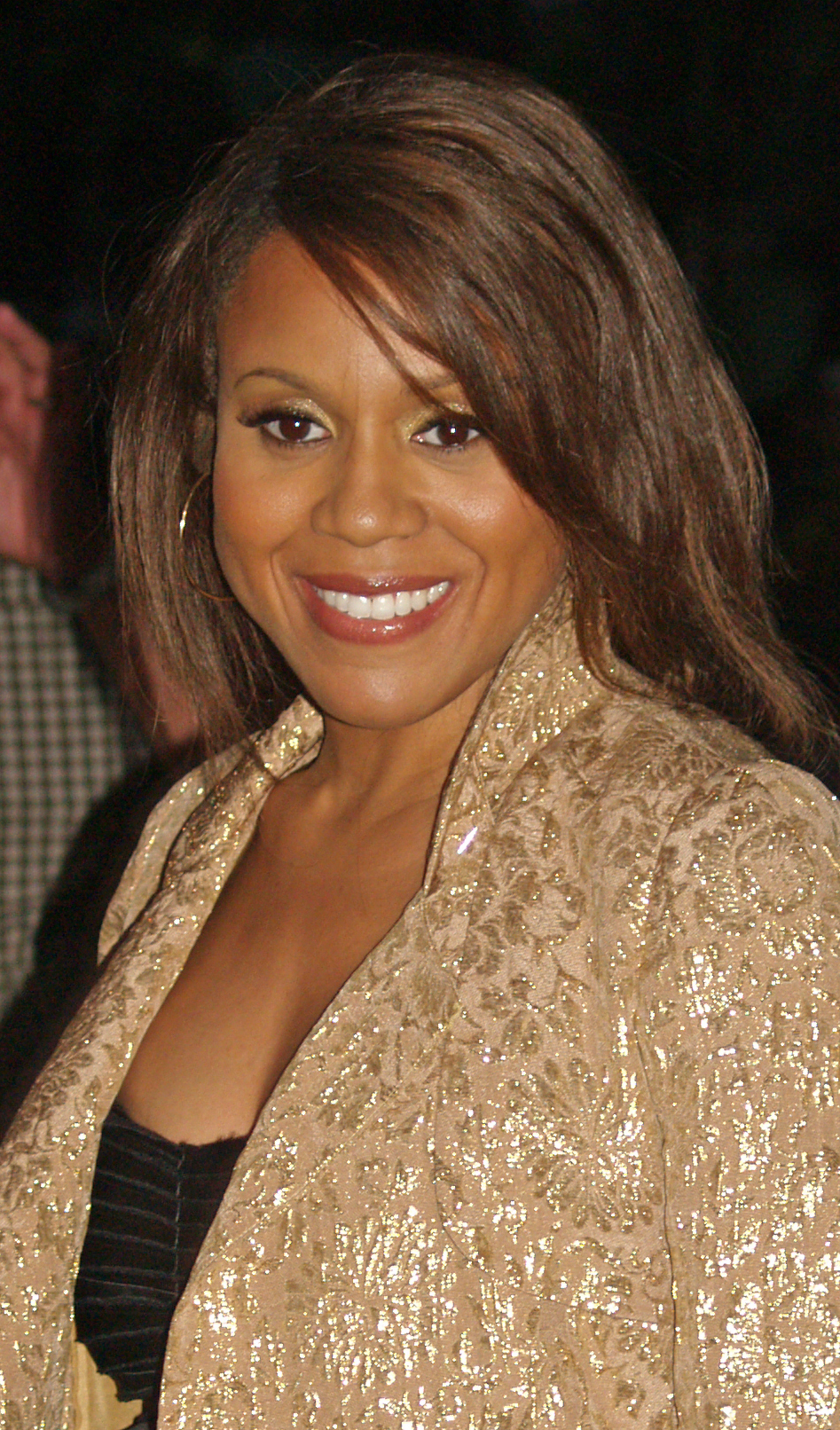
- Cox at the 2011 Mercedes-Benz Fashion Week Miami
- Studio albums: 5
- Extended plays: 1
- Compilation albums: 3
- Singles: 27
- Remix albums: 1

Canadian singer and songwriter Deborah Cox has released ten albums (including five studio albums, three compilation albums, one remix album, and one extended play), and more than three dozen singles (including seven as a featured artist). She began her career in 1994 as a protégé of music executive Clive Davis, who signed her with Arista Records. Her self-titled debut album, a blend of R&B, soul and hip hop soul, was released in September 1995 and peaked at number 25 on the US Billboard Top R&B/Hip-Hop Albums. A steady seller, it was eventually certified Gold by the Recording Industry Association of America (RIAA) for sales of over 500,000 units. Lead single "Sentimental" became a top thirty success on the US Billboard Hot 100, while second single "Who Do U Love" fared even better on the charts, peaking at number 17 on the Hot 100, while becoming her first number-one hit on the Dance Club Songs.

One Wish, Cox's second album with Arista, was released in September 1998. It peaked at number 72 on the US Billboard 200 and earned a Platinum certification from the RIAA, while reaching gold status in Canada. The album capitalized on the crossover success of lead single "Nobody's Supposed to Be Here," which became Cox's biggest-charting single yet, reaching number two on the US Billboard Hot 100. The song also reached number one on the Hot R&B/Hip-Hop Songs, spending a then record-breaking 14 weeks at number one, while follow-up singles "It's Over Now", "We Can't Be Friends" and "I Never Knew" becoming chart-toppers on the Hot R&B/Hip-Hop Songs or the Dance Club Songs chart.

Following her transition to J Records, Cox released her third studio album The Morning After in November 2002. It became her biggest-charting album on the US Billboard 200 yet, debuting and peaking at number 38, but – with US sales of 200,000 copies – the album was commercially less successful than her previous two albums. The Morning After generated four singles, including "Mr. Lonely" and "Play Your Part," both of which topped the US Dance Club Songs chart. In July 2003, J Records released the club/house-heavy remix album Remixed. "Something Happened on the Way to Heaven," the album's solo single, became the first song to spend eleven weeks atop the US Hot Dance Airplay chart.

Following a longer hiatus during which she recorded several standalone singles, Cox released her fourth studio album Destination Moon in June 2007. A tribute album to jazz singer Dinah Washington, the album debuted and peaked at number three on the Billboard Top Jazz Albums. The following year, Image Entertainment and the Deco Recording Group released her fifth album The Promise. A return to her R&B sounds, it reached number 14 on the US Top R&B/Hip-Hop Albums. Lead single "Beautiful U R," another number-one hit on the US Dance Club Songs chart, became her biggest-selling single in years, reaching the top ten on the Canadian Hot 100, while also going Platinum in Canada. "If It Wasn't for Love" (2011) and "Higher" (2013), two further standalone singles, became her tenth and twelfth chart topper on the US Dance Club Songs chart.

In 2015, the singer provided vocals for the made for television biographical film Whitney, based on American recording artist Whitney Houston. The same year, she released the deep house-influenced "Kinda Miss You", as well as the ballad "More Than I Knew" as singles. Both were set to appear on her sixth album Work of Art, though, after several delays, the album was left unreleased. In support of the musical The Bodyguard, Cox released the 2016 EP I Will Always Love You on Deco and Broadway Records, containing cover versions of seven Whitney Houston originals as well as Houston's cover of Dolly Parton's "I Will Always Love You." In June 2017, she released an uptempo dance single "Let the World Be Ours Tonight" during LGBTQ pride season on Radikal Records and Galactic Media. It marked her 13th single to top Billboard's Dance Club Songs.

== Albums ==
=== Studio albums ===
List of studio albums, with selected chart positions and certifications
Title	Album details	Peak chart positions									Certifications
Title	Album details	CAN	CAN R&B	AUS	NZ	US	US R&B	US Heat.	US Jazz	US Indie	Certifications
Deborah Cox	Released: September 12, 1995; Label: Arista; Format: LP, cassette, CD	55	—	66	49	102	25	1	—	—	MC: Platinum; RIAA: Gold
One Wish	Released: September 29, 1998; Label: Arista; Format: LP, cassette, CD	—	—	—	—	72	14	1	—	—	MC: Gold; RIAA: Platinum
The Morning After	Released: November 5, 2002; Label: J; Format: CD, digital download	—	—	—	—	38	7	—	—	—	
Destination Moon	Released: June 19, 2007; Label: Decca; Format: CD, digital download	—	30	—	—	175	24	—	3	—	
The Promise	Released: November 11, 2008; Label: Deco; Format: CD, digital download	95	9	—	—	106	14	—	—	8	

=== Remix albums ===
List of remix albums, with selected chart positions
Title	Album details	Peak chart positions
Title	Album details	US R&B
Remixed	Released: July 22, 2003; Label: J; Format: LP, Cassette, CD	85

=== Compilation albums ===
List of compilation albums
Title	Album details
Ultimate Deborah Cox	Released: May 18, 2004; Label: BMG Heritage; Format: CD, digital download
S.O.U.L.	Released: February 22, 2011; Label: Sony; Format: CD, digital download
Playlist: The Very Best of Deborah Cox	Released: October 15, 2013; Label: Legacy; Format: CD, digital download

== EPs ==
List of extended plays
Title	EP details
I Will Always Love You	Released: March 31, 2017; Label: Deco, Broadway; Format: CD, digital download

== Singles ==
=== As lead artist ===
List of singles as lead artist, with selected chart positions and certifications, showing year released and album name
Title	Year	Peak chart positions							Certifications (sales thresholds)	Album
Title	Year	CAN	AUS	NZ	UK	US	US R&B	US Dance	Certifications (sales thresholds)	Album
"Sentimental"	1995	31	49	46	34	27	4	33		Deborah Cox
"Who Do U Love"	1996	15	11	2	31	17	12	1	ARIA: Gold	Deborah Cox
"Where Do We Go from Here"	1996	37	—	20	—	48	28	23		Deborah Cox
"The Sound of My Tears"	1996	—	—	—	—	97	51	—		Deborah Cox
"It Could've Been You"	1996	—	—	—	—	—	—	—		Deborah Cox
"Just Be Good to Me"	1996	—	—	—	—	—	—	8		Deborah Cox
"Things Just Ain't the Same"	1997	29	—	—	—	56	22	1		Money Talks soundtrack / One Wish
"Nobody's Supposed to Be Here"	1998	8	62	—	55	2	1	1	RIAA: Platinum	One Wish
"It's Over Now"	1999	—	—	—	49	70	20	1		One Wish
"We Can't Be Friends" (with R. L. Huggar)	1999	—	—	—	—	8	1	—	RIAA: Gold	One Wish
"September"	2000	—	—	—	—	—	—	—		One Wish
"I Never Knew"	2000	—	—	—	—	—	—	1		One Wish
"Same Script, Different Cast" (with Whitney Houston)	2000	—	—	—	—	70	14	4		Whitney: The Greatest Hits
"Absolutely Not"	2001	—	—	—	—	—	—	1		Dr. Dolittle 2 soundtrack
"Up & Down (In & Out)"	2002	—	—	—	—	—	58	—		The Morning After
"Mr. Lonely"	2002	—	62	—	—	—	—	1		The Morning After
"Play Your Part"	2003	—	—	—	—	—	—	1		The Morning After
"The Morning After"	2003	—	—	—	—	—	63	—		The Morning After
"Something Happened on the Way to Heaven"	2003	—	—	—	—	95	—	1		Remixed
"Easy as Life"	2004	—	—	—	—	—	—	24		Non-album singles
"House Is Not a Home"	2005	—	—	—	—	—	—	1		Non-album singles
"Everybody Dance (Clap Your Hands)"	2007	—	—	—	—	—	—	17		Non-album singles
"Did You Ever Love Me"	2008	—	—	—	—	—	69	—		The Promise
"Beautiful U R"	2008	10	—	—	—	—	—	1	MC: Platinum	The Promise
"Saying Goodbye"	2009	—	—	—	—	—	109	—		The Promise
"If It Wasn't for Love"	2011	—	—	—	—	—	—	1		Non-album singles
"No Labels Anthem"	2012	—	—	—	—	—	—	—		Non-album singles
"Higher" (featuring Paige)	2013	—	—	—	—	—	—	1		Non-album singles
"Kinda Miss You"	2015	—	—	—	—	—	—	29		Non-album singles
"More Than I Knew"	2015	—	—	—	—	—	— (Note: "More Than I Knew" did not enter the Billboard R&B/Hip-Hop Hotsongs, but peaked at No. 16 on the Adult R&B Songs chart.)	—		Non-album singles
"Let the World Be Ours Tonight"	2017	—	—	—	—	—	—	1		Non-album singles
"Easy Way"	2019	—	—	—	—	—	—	—		Non-album singles
"Gimme Gimme Gimme Some Christmas"	2019	—	—	—	—	—	—	—		Non-album singles
"I Really Don’t Want Much for Christmas"	2020	—	—	—	—	—	—	—		Non-album singles
"Santa Baby"	2020	—	—	—	—	—	—	—		Non-album singles
"—" denotes releases that did not chart

=== Featured singles ===
List of singles as featured artist, with selected chart positions, showing year released and album name
Title	Year	Peak chart positions		Album
Title	Year	SWE	US Dance	Album
"Stupid Like U" (Fanatic featuring Deborah Cox)	2005	—	—	Eye Want Sum Strange
"Leave the World Behind" (Axwell, Ingrosso, Angello, & Laidback Luke featuring Deborah Cox)	2009	39	40	Until One
"Remember Me (From the Ghetto)" (George Vector featuring Deborah Cox)	2012	—	—	Non-album singles
"Everywhere" (MYNC & Mario Fischetti featuring Deborah Cox)	2015	—	8	Non-album singles
"The Girl From Ipanema" (DJ Ana Paula with Deborah Cox)	2016	—	13	Non-album singles
"My Air" (Offer Nissim featuring Deborah Cox)	2016	—	—	Non-album singles
"Nothin But Luv, Pt. II" (Picasso featuring Deborah Cox)	2020	—	—	Non-album singles
"Summer of Love" (Offer Nissim featuring Deborah Cox)	2021	—	—	Non-album singles
"Love Is Love" (Sun-El Musician X Deborah Cox)	2026	—	—	Non-album singles
"—" denotes releases that did not chart
