= Destination Moon =

Destination Moon may refer to:

- Destination Moon (film), a 1950 American science fiction film
- Destination Moon (short story), a 1950 short story by Robert Heinlein, based on the film
- Destination Moon (comics), the sixteenth volume of The Adventures of Tintin by Hergé
- Destination Moon, a 1951 song composed by Marvin Fisher with lyrics by Roy Alfred, performed by the Ames Brothers, Deborah Cox, and others
- Destination Moon, a 1958 album by the Ames Brothers
- Destination: Moon / Angelica's Birthday, a 1994 episode of the animated TV series Rugrats
- Destination Moon, a song by They Might Be Giants from the 1994 album John Henry
- Destination Moon (1989), book by astronaut James Irwin - a 2004 version is called Destination Moon: The Spiritual and Scientific Voyage of the Eighth Man to Walk on the Moon
- Destination Moon (album), a 2007 album by Deborah Cox
- Destination Moon, a 2013 album by Deana Martin
