= The Sound of My Tears =

Single by Deborah Cox

from the album Deborah Cox
- Released: 1996
- Genre: R&B
- Length: 4:48
- Label: Arista
- Songwriters: Keith Crouch; Kipper Jones
- Producer: Keith Crouch

Deborah Cox singles chronology
"Where Do We Go from Here" (1996)	"The Sound of My Tears" (1996)	"It Could've Been You" (1996)

"The Sound of My Tears" is a song by Canadian singer Deborah Cox. It was written by Keith Crouch and Kipper Jones for her self-titled debut studio album (1995), while production was helmed by Crouch. The song was released as the album's fourth single along with "It Could've Been You".

== Critical reception ==
Larry Flick from Billboard magazine wrote, "With this quietly percussive ballad, Cox offers her most engaging single since her debut hit, 'Sentimental'. Producer Keith Crouch keeps the instrumentation simple, surrounding the singer with light acoustic guitar lines, mild organs, and the occasional horn flourish. The result of such an arrangement is a vocal performance with maximum soul. The true success of this single is that it hints at how potent the artist will become as she matures—and she is already fairly far along in her journey there."

== Charts ==
Chart (1996)	Peak position
US Billboard Hot 100	97
US Hot R&B/Hip-Hop Songs (Billboard)	51
