= Remixed =

Remixed may refer to:

- Remix, a piece of media altered from its original state
- Remix album, an album collecting remixed songs
- Remixed Records, a record label associated with Cheiron Studios in Stockholm, Sweden

== Albums ==
- Remixed (Alicia Keys album), 2008
- Remixed (Amber album), 2000
- Remixed (Boom Boom Satellites album), 2012
- Remixed (Deborah Cox album), 2003
- Remixed (Sarah McLachlan album), 2001
- Remixed: The Definitive Collection, by Delerium, 2010
- B in the Mix: The Remixes (working title Remixed), by Britney Spears, 2005
- Bond Remixed, 2003
- Remixed, by Faunts, 2008
- Remixed, by Múm, 2001
- Remixed, by Shpongle, 2003
- Remixed, by Smilers, 2002

== EPs ==
- Remixed (EP), by Elton John, 2003
- Remixed! (Scissor Sisters EP), 2004
- Remixd, by Capital Kings, 2014
- Remixed, by Le Car, 2000

== See also ==
- Category:Remix
- Category:Remix albums
