= Did You Ever Love Me =

Did You Ever Love Me may refer to:

- "Did You Ever Love Me" (Deborah Cox song)
- "Did You Ever Love Me" (Fleetwood Mac song)
