= Up & Down (In & Out) =

Single by Deborah Cox

from the album The Morning After
- Released: 2002
- Length: 5:01
- Label: J
- Songwriters: Alex Richbourg; Deborah Cox; James Wright; Jimmy Jam; Terry Lewis
- Producers: Jimmy Jam & Terry Lewis; James "Big Jim" Wright (ass.); Godson (ass.)

Deborah Cox singles chronology
| "Absolutely Not" (2001) | "Up & Down (In & Out)" (2002) | "Mr. Lonely" (2002) |

"Up & Down (In & Out)" is a song by Canadian singer Deborah Cox. It was written by Cox, Alex Richbourg, James Wright, Jimmy Jam, and Terry Lewis for her third studio album The Morning After (2002), with production helmed by Jam, Lewis, Wright and Godson. The song, along with a slightly remixed version featuring additional vocals from rapper Jadakiss, was released as the album's lead single in 2002, reaching number 23 on the Billboard Adult R&B Songs chart.

== Critical reception ==
Vibe editor Sony Askew felt that "Up & Down (In & Out)" showcased "Deborah's warm and mellow yet classically trained voice." Billboard found that the song recalled Toni Braxton and Whitney Houston.

== Music video ==
A music video for the Allstar Remix of "Up & Down (In & Out)" was directed by Kevin Bray. Rapper Jadakiss appears alongside Cox in the clip.

== Track listings ==
All tracks produced by Jimmy Jam and Terry Lewis, with additional production by James "Big Jim" Wright and Alex Richbourg.

CD single
| No. | Title | Length |
|---|---|---|
| 1. | "Up & Down (In & Out)" (Radio Edit) | 3:58 |
| 2. | "Up & Down (In & Out)" (Instrumental) | 3:58 |
| 3. | "Up & Down (In & Out)" (Call Out Hook) | 0:10 |

== Credits and personnel ==
Credits lifted from the liner notes of The Morning After.

- Deborah Cox – background vocalist, lead vocalist, writer
- Steve Hodge – mixing engineer
- Jimmy Jam – producer, writer
- Terry Lewis – producer, writer
- Herb Powers, Jr. – mastering engineer
- Alex "Godson" Richbourg – associate producer, writer
- Prof. T – background vocalist
- James "Big Jim" Wright – associate producer, writer

== Charts ==
| Chart (2002–2003) | Peak position |
|---|---|
| Canada (Nielsen SoundScan) | 54 |
| US Adult R&B Songs (Billboard) | 23 |
| US Hot R&B/Hip-Hop Songs (Billboard) | 58 |
