= Higher (Deborah Cox song) =

Single by Deborah Cox
- Released: March 18, 2013
- Genre: Dance; house; EDM
- Length: 3:58
- Label: Electronic Kingdom Records
- Songwriters: Tony Coluccio; Deborah Cox; Hasim Robert Gureli; John Anthony Paige; Michelle Millano; Antony Mirabella III; Lascelles Stephens; Vincent Andrew Villani
- Producers: Lascelles Stephens; Paige

Deborah Cox singles chronology
"If It Wasn't for Love" (2011)	"Higher" (2013)	"Kinda Miss You" (2015)

"Higher" is a song by Canadian singer Deborah Cox featuring Paige. The song written by Cox, Paige, Tony Coluccio, Hasim Robert Guerli, Michelle Millano, Anthony Mirabella, Lascelles Stephens, Vincent Andrew Villani and produced by Stephens and Paige. It was released as a single on March 18, 2013 by Electronic Kingdom Records. A six-track remix EP of the song was released on October 25, 2013. The track became Cox's twelfth number one hit on Billboard's US Dance Club Songs chart.

== Track listings ==
Digital single
No.	Title	Length
1.	"Higher" (Radio Version)	3:58
2.	"Higher" (Extended Version)	6:38

Remix single
No.	Title	Length
1.	"Higher" (DJ Escape & Tony Coluccio Mix)	8:15
2.	"Higher" (DJ Escape & Tony Coluccio Dub)	6:52
3.	"Higher" (Paige Resurrection Mix)	6:45
4.	"Higher" (Dave Rose & Dimitri Tee Mix)	7:08
5.	"Higher" (Chris Staropoli Mix)	8:38
6.	"Higher" (Carlos Melange Mix)	6:00

== Charts ==
=== Weekly charts ===
Chart (2013–2014)	Peak position
US Dance Club Songs (Billboard)	1
US Hot Dance/Electronic Songs (Billboard)	23

=== Year-end charts ===
Chart (2014)	Position
US Dance Club Songs (Billboard)	49
US Hot Dance/Electronic Songs (Billboard)	100

== See also ==
- List of number-one dance singles of 2014 (U.S.)
