= Mr. Lonely (Deborah Cox song) =

Single by Deborah Cox

from the album The Morning After
- Released: 2002
- Length: 4:08
- Label: J
- Songwriter(s): Ahmad Russell; Christopher Jennings; Eric Johnson; Eric Jones; Takia Jennings; Terry Johnson
- Producer(s): Christopher Jennings; Eric Johnson; William Lockwood

Deborah Cox singles chronology
"Up & Down (In & Out)" (2002)	"Mr. Lonely" (2002)	"Play Your Part" (2003)

"Mr. Lonely" is a song by Canadian singer Deborah Cox. It was written by Ahmad Russell, Christopher Jennings, Eric Johnson, Eric Jones, Takia Jennings, and Terry Johnson for her third studio album The Morning After (2002), with production helmed by Jennings and Johnson along with William Lockwood. The song, along with several remix versions, was released as the album's second single in fall 2002 and reached number one the US Billboard Dance Club Songs.

== Track listing ==
CD single
No.	Title	Writer(s)	Producer(s)	Length
1.	"Mr. Lonely" (Radio Edit)	Ahmad Russell; Christopher Jennings; Eric Johnson; Eric Jones; Takia Jennings; Terry Johnson	Jennings; Johnson; William Lockwood	3:58
2.	"Mr. Lonely" (Hex Hector/Mac Quayle Main Mix)	Russell; Jennings; Johnson; Jones; Jennings; Johnson	Jennings; Johnson; Lockwood; Hex Hector^{[a]}; Mac Quayle^{[a]}	10:04
3.	"Mr. Lonely" (Junior Vasquez Club Lonely Mix)	Russell; Jennings; Johnson; Jones; Jennings; Johnson	Jennings; Johnson; Lockwood; Junior Vasquez^{[a]}	10:46
4.	"Mr. Lonely" (Widelife Mixshow)	Russell; Jennings; Johnson; Jones; Jennings; Johnson	Jennings; Johnson; Lockwood; Widelife Rachid^{[a]}; Ian J^{[a]}	6:38
5.	"Absolutely Not" (Chanel Club Mix)	Deborah Cox; Johnson; Jennings; Russel; Tiffany Palmer; Jones; Glasco	Jennings; Johnson; Lockwood^{[b]}; Hector^{[a]}; Quayle^{[a]}	10:02

Notes

- ^{^[a]} denotes additional producer
- ^{^[b]} denotes co-producer

== Credits and personnel ==
Credits taken from the liner notes of The Morning After.

- Deborah Cox – background vocalist, lead vocalist
- Christopher Jennings – producer, writer
- Takia Jennings – writer
- Eric Johnson – producer, writer
- Terry Johnson – writer
- Eric Jones – writer
- William Lockwood – producer
- J. Mai – background vocalist
- Tiffany Palmer – background vocalist
- Ahmad Russell – writer

== Charts ==
Chart performance for "Mr. Lonely"
Chart (2002)	Peak position
Australia (ARIA)	62
US Dance Club Songs (Billboard)	1
