= More Than I Knew =

Single by Deborah Cox
- Released: April 14, 2015
- Length: 3:56
- Label: Deco
- Songwriter(s): Deborah Cox; Samantha Nelson-Gums; Thaddeus Dixon; Jeremy Gritter
- Producer(s): Thaddeus Dixon

Deborah Cox singles chronology
"Kinda Miss You" (2015)	"More Than I Knew" (2015)	"Let the World Be Ours Tonight" (2017)

"More Than I Knew" is a song by Canadian singer Deborah Cox. It was written by Cox along with Thaddeus Dixon, Samantha Nelson-Gums, and Jeremy Gritter for her unreleased sixth studio album Work of Art, initially announced for an August 2015 release through Deco and Primary Wave Music. The song was released as the album's second single on April 14, 2015 and peaked at number 16 on the US Billboard Adult R&B Songs.

== Track listing ==
Digital download
No.	Title	Length
1.	"More Than I Knew"	3:56

== Charts ==
Chart (2015)	Peak position
US Adult R&B Songs (Billboard)	16

== Release history ==
Region	Date	Format	Label	Ref.
Worldwide	April 14, 2015	digital download; streaming	Deco	
