= Play Your Part =

Single by Deborah Cox

from the album The Morning After
- Released: June 2003
- Genre: R&B
- Length: 3:48
- Label: J
- Songwriter(s): Shep Crawford
- Producer(s): Shep Crawford

Deborah Cox singles chronology
| "Mr. Lonely" (2002) | "Play Your Part" (2003) | "The Morning After" (2003) |

"Play Your Part" is a song by Canadian singer Deborah Cox. It was written and produced by frequent collaborator Shep Crawford for her third studio album The Morning After (2002). Released as the album's third single, it became her eighth number one hit on Billboard's US Dance Club Songs chart and received heavy airplays on Urban AC stations such as WAMO in Pittsburgh, WHUR in Washington D.C, E93 in Savannah, and WDAS in Philadelphia.

== Track listings ==
CD single
| No. | Title | Length |
|---|---|---|
| 1. | "Play Your Part" (Radio Edit) | 3:47 |
| 2. | "Play Your Part" (Instrumental) | 3:49 |
| 3. | "Play Your Part" (Call Out Hook) | 0:10 |

== Charts ==
| Chart (2003) | Peak position |
|---|---|
| US Adult R&B Songs (Billboard) | 38 |
| US Dance Club Songs (Billboard) | 1 |
