= Kinda Miss You =

Single by Deborah Cox
- Released: February 3, 2015
- Genre: Dance-pop; R&B
- Length: 3:43
- Label: Deco
- Songwriters: Jessica Ashley; Leon Thomas III; Khris Riddick-Tynes
- Producer: The Rascals

Deborah Cox singles chronology
"Higher" (2013)	"Kinda Miss You" (2015)	"More Than I Knew" (2015)

"Kinda Miss You" is a song by Canadian singer Deborah Cox. It was written by Jessica Ashley, Leon Thomas III, and Khris Riddick-Tynes for her unreleased sixth studio album Work of Art, initially announced for an August 2015 release through Deco and Primary Wave Music, with production helmed by Thomas and Riddick-Tynes under their production moniker The Rascals. The song was released as the album's first single on February 3, 2015.

== Track listing ==
Digital download
No.	Title	Length
1.	"Kinda Miss You"	3:17

== Charts ==
Chart (2018)	Peak position
US Dance Club Songs (Billboard)	29
