= Beautiful U R =

Single by Deborah Cox

from the album The Promise
- Released: September 2008
- Genre: R&B
- Length: 4:10 (album version); 4:17 (radio edit)
- Label: Deco
- Songwriters: Deborah Cox; Bobby Ross Avila; Issiah J. Avila; Johnny Najera; Sam Salter; Rick Thomson; James Q. Wright
- Producers: The Avila Brothers; Big Jim

Deborah Cox singles chronology
"Did You Ever Love Me" (2008)	"Beautiful U R" (2008)	"Saying Goodbye" (2009)

"Beautiful U R" is a song by Canadian singer Deborah Cox. It was written by Cox along with Bobby Ross Avila, Issiah J. Avila, Johnny Najera, Sam Salter, Rick Thomson, and James "Big Jim" Wright for her fifth studio album The Promise (2008), while production was helmed by The Avila Brothers and Big Jim. The song was released as the album's second single in September 2008 and peaked at number 10 on the Canadian Hot 100.

== Track listings ==
Digital download
No.	Title	Length
1.	"Beautiful U R"	4:10

== Charts ==
=== Weekly charts ===
Chart (2008–09)	Peak position
Canada Hot 100 (Billboard)	10
US Dance Club Songs (Billboard)	1

=== Year-end charts ===
Chart (2009)	Position
Canada (Canadian Hot 100)	39
US Dance Club Songs (Billboard)	3

== Certifications ==
Region	Certification	Certified units/sales
Canada (Music Canada)	Platinum	40,000^{*}
^{*} Sales figures based on certification alone.
