= If It Wasn't for Love =

Single by Deborah Cox
- Released: November 26, 2011
- Genre: Dance-pop; house
- Length: 4:08
- Label: Deco
- Songwriter(s): Deborah Cox; Janice Robinson; Lascelles Stephens; Marc Stout

Deborah Cox singles chronology
| "Saying Goodbye" (2009) | "If It Wasn't for Love" (2011) | "No Labels Anthem" (2013) |

"If It Wasn't for Love" is a song recorded and written by Canadian singer Deborah Cox. Released as a standalone single on November 26, 2011, the track became her 11th number one hit on Billboard's US Dance Club Songs.

== Track listings ==
Digital single
| No. | Title | Length |
|---|---|---|
| 1. | "If It Wasn't for Love" (Mixin Marc & Tony Svejda Original Edit) | 4:08 |
| 2. | "If It Wasn't for Love" (Mixin Marc & Tony Svejda Remix Edit) | 4:06 |
| 3. | "If It Wasn't for Love" (Young Collective Radio Edit) | 4:02 |
| 4. | "If It Wasn't for Love" (Razor Guido Skribble Radio Edit) | 4:28 |
| 5. | "If It Wasn't for Love" (Papercha$er Mix) | 6:18 |
| 6. | "If It Wasn't for Love" (Mixin Marc & Tony Svejda Original Mix) | 7:46 |
| 7. | "If It Wasn't for Love" (Mixin Marc & Tony Svejda Remix) | 8:09 |
| 8. | "If It Wasn't for Love" (Young Collective Mixshow) | 6:40 |
| 9. | "If It Wasn't for Love" (Razor Guido Skribble Mixshow) | 6:58 |

== Charts ==
=== Weekly charts ===
| Chart (2011) | Peak position |
|---|---|
| US Dance Club Songs (Billboard) | 1 |

=== Year-end charts ===
| Chart (2012) | Position |
|---|---|
| US Dance Club Songs (Billboard) | 50 |
