= The Promise (Deborah Cox album) =

Studio album by Deborah Cox
- Released: November 11, 2008
- Genre: R&B
- Length: 43:47
- Labels: Deco; Image
- Producers: The Avila Brothers; Tom Craskey; Shep Crawford; Jimmy Jam; Terry Lewis; John Legend; Big Jim; Davix; Professa Funk; Phillip "P3" Scott; Devo Springsteen; Rob Torres

Deborah Cox chronology
Destination Moon (2007)	The Promise (2008)

The Promise is the fifth studio album by Canadian R&B singer Deborah Cox. It was released on November 11, 2008, worldwide and marked her debut with Image Entertainment and Deco Recording Group. While her 2007 album Destination Moon was a jazz tribute, this one marks her return to R&B music six years after The Morning After (2002). The album received a generally good critical reception.

The Promise debuted at number 106 on the US Billboard 200, number 14 on the Top R&B/Hip-Hop Albums, and number 95 on the Canadian Albums Chart. The album was nominated for R&B/Soul Recording of the Year at the 2009 Juno Awards. It also features Cox's tenth number hit on the Dance Club Songs chart, "Beautiful U R".

== Critical reception ==
Professional ratings
Review scores
Source	Rating
Allmusic	3.5/5 stars
Okayplayer	(75/100)
Toronto Star	)
People	3/4 stars

People magazine critic Ivory Jeff rated The Promise three out of four stars. He found that with The Promise "Cox makes a winning return to the pop-friendly soul with which she began her career. Her powerful yet sensitive delivery is showcased on smooth grooves and ballads like the John Legend-assisted title track." Jon Pareles from The New York Times wrote that "tears lurk just behind Deborah Cox's tremulous voice, and the closer they get to the surface the better she sounds on her fourth R&B studio album [...] While echoes of Ms. Houston haven't completely disappeared, and there's a hint of Ms. Jackson in some songs, the album reveals much more of Ms. Cox's tangy, sympathetic voice [...] Whether she's aching or pulling herself together, she now sounds like her own woman." Toronto Star critic Ashante Infantry remarked that while "Cox's rich pipes are as vibrant as ever, there's not a single song taking them to their 1998 "Nobody's Supposed to Be Here" zenith."

AllMusic editor Pemberton Roach rated The Promise three and a half out of five stars and noted that Cox "delivers a set of eminently smooth yet impassioned music which alternates between hip-hop-style jams ("Saying Goodbye") and neo-soul fare ("You Know Where My Heart Is")." Peggy Oliver from online magazine SoulTracks called the album "a mixed bag [...] Cox's voice is still worthy, cutting like a knife and arousing emotions. Yet somehow she still needs to gather more ammunition in gaining her groove back that captured both Davis's initial interest and sophisticated R&B audiences initial attention." In a negative review, Associated Press wrote that "Cox should think twice about making promises she can't keep [...] The Promise is mediocre at best and features overused lyrics and average production." The news agency found that "the new CD shows that Cox has not grown musically in the last six years."

== Chart performance ==
In the United States, The Promise debuted and peaked at number 106 on the US Billboard 200 and number 14 on the Top R&B/Hip-Hop Albums. It marked Cox's lowest opening for a non-specialty album up to then and was a considerable decline from her previous major label effort The Morning After (2002), which had entered the top ten of the Top R&B/Hip-Hop Albums chart. On the Independent Albums, The Promise became Cox's first album to chart, peaking at number eight.

== Track listing ==
The Promise track listing
No.	Title	Writer(s)	Producer(s)	Length
1.	"Love Is Not Made in Words"	Deborah Cox; James Harris III; Terry Lewis; James Q. Wright	Jimmy Jam & Terry Lewis; Big Jim	4:11
2.	"You Know Where My Heart Is"	Cox; Tom Craskey; DeVon Harris; Estelle Swaray	Devo Springsteen; Craskey^{[a]}	3:55
3.	"Did You Ever Love Me"	Cox; J. Harris; Lewis; Wright	Jam; Lewis; Big Jim	3:37
4.	"Saying Goodbye"	Shep Crawford; Shalonda Crawford	Rob Torres; Phillip "P3" Scott	4:20
5.	"Beautiful U R"	Cox; Bobby Ross Avila; Issiah J. Avila; Johnny Najera; Sam Salter; Rick Thomson; Wright	The Avila Brothers; Big Jim	4:10
6.	"The Promise"	Harris; John Stephens	Springsteen; John Legend^{[a]}	3:31
7.	"All Over Me"	Cox; J. Harris; Lewis; Lascelles Stephens; Wright	Jam; Lewis; Big Jim	3:36
8.	"All Hearts Aren't Shaped the Same"	J. Harris; Lewis; Wright	Jam; Lewis; Big Jim	3:40
9.	"Down 4 U"	B. Avila; I. Avila; Cox; Najera; Salter; Wright	The Avila Brothers; Big Jim	4:08
10.	"Where Do We Go 2"	Shep Crawford; Onitsha Shaw; Isaiah Thomas	Crawford; Davix; Professa Funk	3:39
Total length:				43:47

Notes

- ^{^[a]} signifies co-producer

== Charts ==
=== Weekly charts ===
Weekly chart performance for The Promise
Chart (2008)	Peak position
Canadian Albums (Billboard)	95
US Billboard 200	106
US Independent Albums (Billboard)	8
US Top R&B/Hip-Hop Albums (Billboard)	14

=== Year-end charts ===
Year-end chart performance for The Promise
Chart (2009)	Position
US Top R&B/Hip-Hop Albums (Billboard)	99

== Release history ==
The Promise release history
Region	Date	Format	Label	Ref(s)
Various	November 11, 2008	CD; Digital download	Deco; Image	
