= Where Do We Go from Here (Deborah Cox song) =

1996 single by Deborah Cox

Single by Deborah Cox

from the album Deborah Cox
- Released: June 4, 1996
- Length: 4:17
- Label: Arista
- Songwriters: Larry "Rock" Campbell; Lascelles Stephens
- Producer: Vincent Herbert

Deborah Cox singles chronology
"Who Do U Love" (1996)	"Where Do We Go from Here" (1996)	"Just Be Good to Me" (1996)

"Where Do We Go from Here" is a song by Canadian singer Deborah Cox. It was written by Larry "Rock" Campbell and Lascelles Stephens for her self-titled debut studio album (1995), while production was helmed by Vincent Herbert. Released as the album's third single by Arista Records, it peaked at number 20 in New Zealand, number 48 in the United States, and number 66 in Canada.

== Critical reception ==
Peter Miro from Cash Box wrote, "Ms. Cox submits a cleanly mastered, radio-friendly ballad, with old school, gospel-tinged flavor. The buildup to this tune is reminiscent of the classic crescendos in 'Remember What I Told You To Forget' by Tavares, but straddles a pop/soul borderline."

== Track listings ==
CD single
No.	Title	Length
1.	"Where Do We Go from Here"	4:19
2.	"Call Me"	4:46

== Charts ==
Chart (1996)	Peak position
Canada Top Singles (RPM)	66
New Zealand (Recorded Music NZ)	20
US Billboard Hot 100	48
US Dance Singles Sales (Billboard) with "Just Be Good to Me"	23
US Hot R&B/Hip-Hop Songs (Billboard)	28
US Cash Box Top 100	44
