= Let the World Be Ours Tonight =

Single by Deborah Cox
- Released: June 30, 2017
- Recorded: 2017
- Genre: Dance-pop; house
- Length: 3:43
- Label: Galactic; Radikal
- Songwriter(s): Deborah Cox; Jenna Mary Donnelly; Jurgen Kordulestch; Warren David Meyers
- Producer(s): Soulshaker

Deborah Cox singles chronology
"More Than I Knew" (2017)	"Let the World Be Ours Tonight" (2017)	"Easy Way" (2019)

"Let the World Be Ours Tonight" is a song recorded by Canadian singer-songwriter Deborah Cox. The song was written by Cox, Jenna Mary Donnelly, Jurgen Kordulestch, and Warren David Meyers, and produced by Soulshaker. It was released as a single on June 30, 2017 by Radikal Records. The track became her 13th number one hit on Billboard's Dance Club Songs chart in its September 16, 2017 issue.

== Track listings ==
Digital single
No.	Title	Length
1.	"Let the World Be Ours Tonight" (StoneBridge & Damien Hall Radio Edit)	3:22
2.	"Let the World Be Ours Tonight" (StoneBridge & Damien Hall Club Mix)	5:22
3.	"Let the World Be Ours Tonight" (StoneBridge & Damien Hall Epic Dub)	5:22
4.	"Let the World Be Ours Tonight" (Soulshaker Original Radio Edit)	3:43
5.	"Let the World Be Ours Tonight" (Soulshaker Original Club Mix)	6:12
6.	"Let the World Be Ours Tonight" (Diamm Remix)	6:07
7.	"Let the World Be Ours Tonight" (Diamm Remix Dub)	6:07
8.	"Let the World Be Ours Tonight" (JKGD BiB Mix)	3:32
9.	"Let the World Be Ours Tonight" (JKGD BiB Extended Mix)	4:35
10.	"Let the World Be Ours Tonight" (Silver Bluff Remix)	5:55

Remix single
No.	Title	Length
1.	"Let the World Be Ours Tonight" (Tony Moran & Warren Rigg Piano Anthem Radio Edit)	3:48
2.	"Let the World Be Ours Tonight" (Tony Moran & Warren Rigg Piano Anthem Club Mix)	5:40
3.	"Let the World Be Ours Tonight" (Tony Moran & Deep Influence Mix)	6:09
4.	"Let the World Be Ours Tonight" (Bimbo Jones Radio Edit)	4:01
5.	"Let the World Be Ours Tonight" (Bimbo Jones Remix)	5:53
6.	"Let the World Be Ours Tonight" (DASCO Radio Edit)	2:51
7.	"Let the World Be Ours Tonight" (DASCO Remix)	6:06
8.	"Let the World Be Ours Tonight" (Mixmaster & Ezio Centanni Classic Anthem Remix)	5:24
9.	"Let the World Be Ours Tonight" (So Cool Network Remix)	5:39
10.	"Let the World Be Ours Tonight" (Al-Faris Massive Remix)	5:17

Candlelight Mix
No.	Title	Length
1.	"Let the World Be Ours Tonight" (Candlelight Mix)	3:22

== Charts ==
=== Weekly charts ===
Chart (2017)	Peak position
US Dance Club Songs (Billboard)	1

=== Year-end charts ===
Chart (2017)	Position
US Dance Club Songs (Billboard)	4

== See also ==
- List of number-one dance singles of 2017 (U.S.)
