= Did You Ever Love Me (Deborah Cox song) =

Single by Deborah Cox

from the album The Promise
- Released: September 2008
- Genre: R&B
- Length: 3:37
- Label: Deco
- Songwriter(s): Deborah Cox; James Harris III; Terry Lewis; James "Big Jim" Wright
- Producer(s): Jimmy Jam & Terry Lewis; Big Jim

Deborah Cox singles chronology
"Everybody Dance (Clap Your Hands)" (2007)	"Did You Ever Love Me" (2008)	"Beautiful U R" (2008)

"Did You Ever Love Me" is a song by Canadian singer Deborah Cox. It was written by Cox along with Big Jim and Jimmy Jam and Terry Lewis for her fifth studio album The Promise (2008), while production was helmed by Jim, Jam and Lewis. The ballad was released as the album's lead single in September 2008 and peaked at number 22 on the US Billboard Adult R&B Songs.

== Track listings ==
Digital download
No.	Title	Length
1.	"Did You Ever Love Me"	3:37

== Charts ==
Chart (2008)	Peak position
US Adult R&B Songs (Billboard)	22
US Hot R&B/Hip-Hop Songs (Billboard)	69
