= The Morning After (Deborah Cox album) =

Studio album by Deborah Cox
- Released: November 5, 2002
- Genres: Pop; hip-hop; R&B
- Length: 54:15
- Label: J
- Producers: Allstar; Battlecat; Warryn Campbell; Shep Crawford; LaShawn Daniels; Jermaine Dupri; Harold Lilly; D. Christopher Jennings; Rodney Jerkins; Eric Johnson; Jimmy Jam & Terry Lewis; William Lockwood; Big Jim Wright

Deborah Cox chronology
One Wish (1998)	The Morning After (2002)	Remixed (2003)

Singles from The Morning After
- 1. "Up & Down (In & Out)" Released: 2002; 2. "Mr. Lonely" Released: 2002; 3. "Play Your Part" Released: 2003; 4. "The Morning After" Released: 2003

The Morning After is the third album by Canadian singer-songwriter Deborah Cox. It was released on November 5, 2002 in the United States. The Morning After marked the Cox's first record under Clive Davis's J Records roster, with Davis once more serving as executive producer. Keen to build on the success of her previous album One Wish (1998), he enlisted the help of renowned producers such as Jimmy Jam and Terry Lewis, Jermaine Dupri, Rodney "Darkchild" Jerkins, and Shep Crawford as well as up-and-coming producers Warryn Campbell, Johntá Austin and Alex Richbourg, among others.

The album contains a blend of urban R&B and adult contemporary songs with additional dance/house tracks being include. It became her biggest-charting album on the US Billboard 200 yet, debuting and peaking at number 38, and remains her highest-charting album as of 2018. Commercially, the album was less successful than her previous album however. The Morning After album generated four singles, including "Mr. Lonely" and "Play Your Part". A 2-CD limited-edition version of the album was released with additional dance remixes.

== Background ==
In 1995, Deborah Cox was signed by label executive Clive Davis to Arista Records and released her self-titled debut album the same year. A middling commercial and critical success, the album peaked at number 102 on US Billboard 200 but emerged as a steady seller, eventually receiving a gold certification by the Recording Industry Association of America (RIAA), while going platinum in Canada. In 2000, Davis left Arista and started J Records, an independent label with financial backing from Arista parent Bertelsmann Music Group. Following a frustratingly long departure from Arista, Cox's signed with J Records and began work on her third studio album, with Davis, once more serving as executive producer. Keen to build on the success of her previous album One Wish, he enlisted the help of producers such as Jimmy Jam and Terry Lewis, Jermaine Dupri, Rodney "Darkchild" Jerkins, and Shep Crawford as well as up-and-coming producers Warryn Campbell, Johntá Austin and Alex Richbourg to work with Cox.

== Critical reception ==
Professional ratings
Review scores
Source	Rating
AllMusic	3/5 stars
Blender	3/5 stars
Entertainment Weekly	B−
USA Today	2.5/4 stars

The Morning After earned mixed reviews from music critics. AllMusic rated the album three out of five stars and wrote: "Blessed with a voice that makes her sound like a fusion of Gladys Knight and Whitney Houston, Cox's impressive range is a big reason why she's been touted as one of pop music's brighter lights. When she isn't busy working the club side of the coin [...] the petite diva is easing into slow jams like "Play Your Part" and the title cut along with the groove-laden "2 Good 2 Be True"." Entertainment Weekly noted that "the key to Cox's appeal on R&B radio and in gay discos is her melodramatic flair. On her third album, she infuses the best tunes with a fun combo of camp and conviction [...] but too often the bloodless sentiments fail her. She's a scenery-chewing actress without enough meaty roles."

People wrote: "Alternating between light hip hop (with guest turns by rappers Kurupt and Jadakiss) and R&B-pop; ballads in the vein of her 1998 chart-topper "Nobody's Supposed to Be Here," the disc is more for chilling out the morning after a night on the town." The magazine concluded: "The result is nothing that Mary J, Toni and Brandy haven't done before – and done better. Still, the cool mid-tempo groove of "Up & Down (In & Out)" will surely soothe any hangover." Billboard editor Gail Mitchell noted that "Cox's strong suit still remains soaring ballads in the "Nobody's" vein [...] but Cox's more uptempo efforts yield mixed results." She found that her "current single “"Up & Down (In & Out)" and "Oh My Gosh" call to mind Toni Braxton and Whitney Houston rather than Cox, while her teaming with rapper Kurupt on "Just a Dance" is formulaic. Exceptions are Dupri's "2 Good 2 Be True" and Allen "Allstar" Gordon's sassy "Givin' It Up"."

== Commercial performance ==
The Morning After debuted and peaked at number 38 on the US Billboard 200 and number seven on the Top R&B/Hip-Hop Albums chart. It was Cox's highest-charting album yet as well as her first top ten album on the latter chart. By November 2005, The Morning After had sold 200,000 in the United States, according to Nielsen SoundScan.

== Track listing ==
The Morning After track listing
No.	Title	Writer(s)	Producer(s)	Length
1.	"Up & Down (In & Out)"	Alex Richbourg; Deborah Cox; James Wright; Jimmy Jam; Terry Lewis	Jimmy Jam & Terry Lewis; James "Big Jim" Wright^{[a]}; Godson^{[a]}	5:01
2.	"2 Good 2 Be True"	Jermaine Dupri; Harold Lilly	Dupri; Lilly	4:06
3.	"Play Your Part"	Anthony "Shep" Crawford	Crawford	3:48
4.	"Like I Did"	Rodney Jerkins; Fred Jerkins III; LaShawn Daniels; Cox	R. Jerkins; Daniels	3:31
5.	"Hurt So Much"	Wright; Jam; Lewis; Cox	Wright; Jam; Lewis	5:07
6.	"Just a Dance" (featuring Kurupt)	Battlecat; Lilly; Cox	Battlecat	3:42
7.	"The Morning After"	Warryn Campbell; Kenny Bereal; Charlie Bereal; Johntá Austin; Cox; Ethan Farmer	Campbell	4:24
8.	"Givin' It Up"	Allen Gordon; Teron Beal; Joel Campbell; Cox	Allstar; Joel Campbell^{[b]}	3:38
9.	"Up & Down (In & Out)" (Allstar Remix featuring Jadakiss)	Cox; Wright; Jam; Lewis	Jam; Lewis; Wright^{[a]}; Godson^{[a]}; Allstar^{[b]}	4:26
10.	"Oh My Gosh"	John "Jubu" Smith; Campbell; Austin	Campbell	3:57
11.	"Starting with You"	Crawford	Crawford	4:26
12.	"Mr. Lonely" (Hex/Mac Mix Edit)	Ahmad Russell; Christopher Jennings; Eric Johnson; Eric Jones; Takia Jennings; Terry Johnson	Jennings; Johnson; William Lockwood; Hex Hector & Mac Quayle^{[b]}	4:03
13.	"Absolutely Not" (Chanel Mix Edit)	Russell; Jennings; Johnson; Jones; James Glasco; Tiffany Palmer	Jennings; Johnson; Lockwood; Hex Hector & Mac Quayle^{[b]}	4:06
Total length:				54:15

The Morning After – Limited edition bonus disc
No.	Title	Producer(s)	Length
1.	"Mr. Lonely" (Hex Hector/Mac Quayle Main Club Mix)	Hex Hector & Mac Quayle	10:04
2.	"Mr. Lonely" (Hex Hector/Mac Quayle Dub Mix)	Hex Hector & Mac Quayle	7:53
3.	"Mr. Lonely" (Junior Vasquez Club Lonely Mix)	Junior Vasquez	10:46
4.	"Mr. Lonely" (Widelife Radio Mix)	Widelife	4:00
5.	"Mr. Lonely" (Widelife Club Mix)	Widelife	11:26
6.	"Mr. Lonely" (Johnny Vicious Retro Disco Mix)	Johnny Vicious	8:42
7.	"Up & Down (In & Out)" (Godson Remix)	Godson, Xavier "X-Man" Smith	4:50
8.	"Up & Down (In & Out)" (Hex Hector/Mac Quayle Analog Club Mix)	Hex Hector & Mac Quayle	6:38

Notes

- ^a signifies a co-producer
- ^b signifies an additional producer

== Charts ==
Chart performance for The Morning After
Chart (2002)	Peak position
US Billboard 200	38
US Top R&B/Hip-Hop Albums (Billboard)	7
