= Who Do U Love =

1996 single by Deborah Cox

Single by Deborah Cox

from the album Deborah Cox
- Released: January 15, 1996
- Studio: Palm Tree (North Hollywood, California, US); Battery (New York City)
- Length: 4:47
- Label: Arista
- Songwriters: Vassal Benford; Larry "Rock" Campbell
- Producer: Larry "Rock" Campbell

Deborah Cox singles chronology
"Sentimental" (1995)	"Who Do U Love" (1996)	"Where Do We Go from Here" (1996)

Music video
- "Who Do U Love" on YouTube

"Who Do U Love" is a song by Canadian singer Deborah Cox from her self-titled debut studio album (1995). It was written by Larry "Rock" Campbell and Vassal Benford and produced by Campbell, while Benford provided additional production. Arista Records issued the song as the second album's single in January 1996. "Who Do U Love" peaked at number 17 on the US Billboard Hot 100 and was Cox's first number-one hit on the Billboard Dance Club Play chart. Internationally, the single reached number two in New Zealand, number nine in Israel, number 11 in Australia, number 15 in Canada, and number 31 in the United Kingdom. Brett Ratner directed the accompanying music video. The song is certified platinum in New Zealand and gold in Australia.

== Critical reception ==
Larry Flick from Billboard magazine wrote, "Cox comes on with another winning single that coasts on the fuel of a sleek jeep funk groove and a sing-along chorus. Comparisons to labelmate Whitney Houston may continue, but Cox goes a long way toward proving that she has her own special style that stands alone. Over the course of the single's four nicely varied versions, she displays different parts of her personality and vocal palette. Most notably, she shows a sassy edge on Chucky Thompson's spare hip-hop mix, then forceful diva potential on David Morales' splashy pop/house interpretation. Pick a version of this cutie and slam it over and over." Pan-European magazine Music & Media stated, "Another protegee of Arista president Clive Davis, this is a sure fire, future R&B star. Although way too long for radio (8:42), the Morales Classic Club Mix has that fast, perky Eurobeat which is much appreciated this side of the Atlantic."

== Music video ==
The official music video for the song was directed by Brett Ratner and was filmed on the Paramount Studios lot in Los Angeles. It consists of Cox confronting her boyfriend (portrayed by Flex Alexander) for being unfaithful. It begins with Cox in her apartment, being confronted by her friends, who claim that Cox's boyfriend ("Flex") was out and cheating on her the night before. Cox denies it at first, until she hears her boyfriend outside her apartment with his friends. She tries to confront him, but he quickly gets defensive, so Cox's replies "Forget You". Walking down the fire escape with her friends, Cox begins to sing and dance in sync with her friends, as she walks away from Flex. Throughout, he keeps trying to win her back, but in the end, Cox refuses Flex's hand and walks away. The video ends with Flex miming "Damn!".

The dancing in the music video was choreographered by Tina Landon. The video features Nikki Pantenburg, Tish Oliver, Shawnette Heard, and Kelly Konno, all of whom were dancers for Janet Jackson during her janet. era. Landon, herself, who also was Jackson's choreographer at the time, is amongst the background dancers in the video, and can be seen in the last dance sequence of the video.

== Track listings ==
- US CD and cassette single
1. "Who Do U Love" (Gass mix) – 4:26
2. "Who Do U Love" (Morales mix) – 4:45
- UK, European, Australian, and Japanese CD single
1. "Who Do U Love" (radio edit) – 3:59
2. "Who Do U Love" (Morales classic club mix) – 8:42
3. "Who Do U Love" (Driza Bone remix) – 4:08
4. "Who Do U Love" (Gass mix) – 3:59
5. "Who Do U Love" (Driza Bone extended mix) – 5:10
6. "Who Do U Love" (Morales Down Low dub) – 6:11

== Credits and personnel ==
Credits are taken from the US CD single liner notes.

Studios

- Recorded at Palm Tree Studios (North Hollywood, California, US) and Battery Studios (New York City)
- Mixed at Palm Tree Studios (North Hollywood, California, US)

Personnel

- Deborah Cox – vocals, background vocals
- Larry "Rock" Campbell – writing, production, arrangement
- Vassal Benford – writing, additional production
- Chris Trevett – recording
- Ara Darakjian – recording
- Victor Flores – recording, mixing
- Jon Gass – remixing
- Fred Kelly – remixing assistance
- Clive Davis – executive production
- Christopher Stern – art direction
- Ken Banks – photography
- Carlton Jones – styling

== Charts ==
=== Weekly charts ===
Chart (1996)	Peak position
Australia (ARIA)	11
Canada Top Singles (RPM)	15
Canada Adult Contemporary (RPM)	28
Canada Dance/Urban (RPM)	7
Europe (European Dance Radio)	25
Israel (Israeli Singles Chart)	9
New Zealand (Recorded Music NZ)	2
Scottish Singles Sales (Official Charts)	59
UK Singles (Official Charts)	31
UK Dance (Official Charts)	10
UK Hip Hop/R&B (Official Charts)	6
UK Club Chart (Music Week)	10
US Billboard Hot 100	17
US Dance Club Songs (Billboard)	1
US Dance Singles Sales (Billboard)	6
US Hot R&B/Hip-Hop Songs (Billboard)	12
US Pop Airplay (Billboard)	28
US Rhythmic Airplay (Billboard)	19
US Cash Box Top 100	14

=== Year-end charts ===
Chart (1996)	Position
Australia (ARIA)	73
New Zealand (RIANZ)	8
US Billboard Hot 100	80
US Dance Club Play (Billboard)	40
US Hot R&B Singles (Billboard)	56
US Maxi-Singles Sales (Billboard)	21
US Top 40/Rhythm-Crossover (Billboard)	53

== Certifications ==
Region	Certification	Certified units/sales
Australia (ARIA)	Gold	35,000^{^}
New Zealand (RMNZ)	Platinum	10,000^{*}
^{*} Sales figures based on certification alone.^{^} Shipments figures based on certification alone.

== Release history ==
Region	Date	Format(s)	Label(s)	Ref(s).
United States	January 15, 1996	CD; cassette	Arista	
Finland	January 21, 1996	CD	Arista	
United States	January 30, 1996	Contemporary hit radio	Arista	
United Kingdom	February 12, 1996	12-inch vinyl; CD; cassette	Arista	
Japan	February 21, 1996	CD	Arista	
