= Easy Way (song) =

Single by Deborah Cox
- Released: November 1, 2019
- Genre: R&B
- Length: 4:17
- Label: Deco
- Songwriters: Deborah Cox, Rico Love
- Producers: Love, DTown

Deborah Cox singles chronology
"Let the World Be Ours Tonight" (2017)	"Easy Way" (2019)	"Gimme Gimme Gimme Some Christmas" (2019)

"Easy Way" is a song by Canadian singer Deborah Cox. It was written by Cox and Rico Love and produced by Love and DTown. The song was released as the lead single from Cox's yet-to-be-titled seventh studio album on November 1, 2019 through her Deco Recording Group. It peaked at number 13 on the US Adult R&B Songs on May 9, 2020.

== Music video ==
An accompanying music video for "Easy Way" was directed by Parris Stewart. It was released on January 29, 2020.

== Track listings ==
Digital single
No.	Title	Length
1.	"Easy Way"	4:17

Remix EP
No.	Title	Length
1.	"Easy Way" (Terry Hunter Club Mix)	6:43
2.	"Easy Way" (Kelly G. Shelter Mix)	7:41
3.	"Easy Way" (Kelly G. Shelter Inst Dub)	7:38
4.	"Easy Way" (Kelly G. Easy Dub)	6:05
5.	"Easy Way" (Terry Hunter Club Instrumental)	6:43
6.	"Easy Way" (Terry Hunter Beatzpella)	6:43

== Charts ==
Chart (2019)	Peak position
US Adult R&B Songs (Billboard)	13

== Release history ==
Region	Date	Format	Label	Ref.
Worldwide	November 1, 2019	digital download; streaming	Deco	
