= Destination Moon (album) =

Studio album by Deborah Cox
- Released: June 4, 2007
- Recorded: 2005–2006
- Studio: 333; Avatar; Legacy Recording
- Genre: Jazz; R&B
- Length: 43:01
- Label: Decca
- Producer: Rob Mounsey

Deborah Cox chronology
Remixed (2003)	Destination Moon (2007)	The Promise (2008)

Professional ratings
Review scores
Source	Rating
AllMusic	2.5/5 stars

Destination Moon is the fourth album by Canadian R&B singer Deborah Cox. It was released by Decca Records on June 4, 2007 in the United States. A tribute album to jazz singer Dinah Washington, Cox noted it "a concept album that I've had in mind for years". Many of Washington's songs are reinterpreted on the album including the title track "Destination Moon". Most of the album was recorded live with a forty-piece orchestra and was produced and arranged by Rob Mounsey. The week after its release, Destination Moon peaked at number three on the Billboard Top Jazz Albums.

== Track listing ==
Destination Moon – Standard edition
No.	Title	Writer(s)	Length
1.	"Destination Moon"	Roy Alfred; Marvin Fisher	2:41
2.	"What a Difference a Day Made"	Stanley Adams; María Grever	4:07
3.	"Misery"	Dinah Washington; Louis Howard	3:42
4.	"Baby, You've Got What It Takes"	Clyde Otis; Murray Stein	3:35
5.	"This Bitter Earth"	Otis	4:06
6.	"Squeeze Me"	Thomas Waller; Clarence Williams	2:22
7.	"New Blowtop Blues"	Leonard Feather; Jane Feather	3:00
8.	"Blue Skies"	Irving Berlin	4:08
9.	"I Don't Hurt Anymore"	Donald Robertson; Jack Rollins	3:27
10.	"Smoke Gets in Your Eyes"	Otto Harbach; Jerome Kern	4:33
11.	"September in the Rain"	Al Dubin; Harry Warren	3:23
12.	"Look to the Rainbow"	E.Y. Harburg; Burton Lane	3:55
Total length:			43:01

Circuit City Exclusive Bonus Track
No.	Title	Writer(s)	Length
13.	"Out of Sight Out of Mind"	Otis; Ivory Joe Hunter	4:19
Total length:			47:20

== Charts ==
Chart performance for Destination Moon
Chart (2007)	Peak position
US Top Jazz Albums (Billboard)	3
US Top R&B/Hip-Hop Albums (Billboard)	24
US Billboard 200	175
