= Deborah Cox (album) =

Studio album by Deborah Cox
- Released: September 12, 1995
- Genres: Pop; hip-hop soul; R&B
- Length: 57:23
- Labels: Vaz; Arista
- Producers: Dallas Austin; Tim & Bob; Vassal Benford; Larry "Rock" Campbell; Daryl Simmons; Keith Crouch; Lascelles Stephens; Vincent Herbert; Keith Thomas; Kenneth "Babyface" Edmonds; Keith Andes

Deborah Cox chronology
Deborah Cox (1995)	One Wish (1998)

Singles from Deborah Cox
- 1. "Sentimental" Released: September 21, 1995; 2. "Who Do U Love" Released: January 15, 1996; 3. "Where Do We Go from Here"/"Just Be Good to Me" Released: June 17, 1996; 4. "The Sound of My Tears" Released: November 25, 1996; 5. "It Could've Been You" Released: November 25, 1996

Deborah Cox is the self-titled debut album by Canadian singer Deborah Cox. It was released by Arista Records and Vassal Benford's vanity label Vaz Records on September 12, 1995, in the United States. Cox was signed by Clive Davis to Arista after he discovered her during a performance as Celine Dion's backing vocalist at The Arsenio Hall Show in 1994. In preparation of her debut album, the label consulted a variety of producers to work with her, including Tim & Bob, Babyface, Daryl Simmons and Dallas Austin.

The album was released to generally positive reviews from music critics, though some felt that the material was uneven. While it failed to crack the upper half of the US Billboard 200, Deborah Cox emerged as a steady seller, particularly based on the crossover success of its second single "Who Do U Love," which became a hit on the dance market. It reached Platinum status in Canada and was certified Gold by the Recording Industry Association of America (RIAA) for shipment figures of over 500,000 units. Deborah Cox earned Cox the Juno Award for Best R&B/Soul Recording at the 1996 awards ceremony.

== Background ==
Cox began singing on TV commercials at age twelve, and entered various talent shows including an appearance on Tiny Talent Time. She performed in nightclubs as a teenager, and began to write music around the same time. Cox entered the music industry in the early 1990s, performing as a backup vocalist for Celine Dion for six months. In 1992, she also appeared on Canadian rapper Devon's album titled It's My Nature on the track "that is a Friend." After receiving several rejection letters from Canadian record labels that claimed their "quota" had been reached, Cox moved to Los Angeles in 1994 with producer and songwriting partner, Lascelles Stephens.

The same year, she met Arista Records executive Clive Davis when she was again singing backup vocals for Dion on The Arsenio Hall Show. Impressed by the "creamy power of her voice," he signed her to Arista. To capture her versatility, the label teamed her with several heavyweight songwriters and producers, including Dallas Austin, Tim & Bob, Daryl Simmons, Keith Crouch, Vincent Herbert, Keith Thomas, and Babyface. Cox, who co-wrote three songs on what would become her self-titled debut album, commented on the creation procss: "We spent a long time hand-picking material. Our approach was to find real songs that would have that "timeless" quality. It took a while [...] but I knew what I wanted and I think there is some great material here."

== Promotion ==
In hopes to separate Cox from the rest of Arista's other young female singers such as Monica and Faith Evans, the label set up a number of intimate solo showcases in the weeks leading up to Deborah Cox's release. In August 1995, she appeared on several R&B and top 40/rhythm programmers in New York, Los Angeles, Dallas, Chicago, and Washington, D.C. Cox also performed at the Musicland and several Target conventions the same month. In addition, she shared bill with other singers at the KMEL San Francisco concert on August 25, 1995 and embarked on a European promotional tour afterwards.

=== Singles ===
Arista selected Dallas Austin-produced "Sentimental" to precede the album as its lead single. The song peaked at number 27 on the US Billboard Hot 100 and number 4 on the Hot R&B/Hip-Hop Songs chart, with its Brett Ratner-directed music video earning Cox a nomination for Best New Artist Clip at the 1996 Billboard Music Video Awards. Second single "Who Do U Love" peaked at number 17 on the Billboard Hot 100 and enjoyed success in the dance market, with its remixes reaching the top of the magazine's Hot Dance Club Songs, selling 500,000 copies domestically. It also attained worldwide success, peaking at number two on the New Zealand Singles Chart and reaching the Top 20 on other international charts. "Where Do We Go from Here," which served as the album's third single along with the S.O.S. Band cover "Just Be Good to Me," became a top ten hit in New Zealand and reached number 28 on the Hot R&B/Hip-Hop Songs chart. Two further singles, the Keith Crouch-penned "The Sound of My Tears" and the Tim & Bob-produced "It Could've Been You," were released in 1996, though only the former managed to chart in the United States.

== Critical reception ==
Professional ratings
Review scores
Source	Rating
AllMusic	4/5 stars

AllMusic editor Stephen Thomas Erlewine found that Cox "is a confident and stylish singer, but her self-titled debut is helped considerably by the powerhouse producers work behind the scenes [...] The record is filled with immaculately crafted dance-pop and ballads. Not all of the songs are up to the production standards, however. Like many singers in her genre, Deborah Cox is only as good as her material, and the songs on their debut are uneven [...] Nevertheless, the best songs on the album suggests that Cox has the potential to develop into a star." Gil L. Robertson IV from Cash Box magazine called the album a "well-polished mix of pop and R&B styles that should do well on the marketplace. Everything about this project is first rate, from the glossy but solid musical production to the song selection and Cox's delivery. Although she has been hyped as Arista's next Whitney Houston, Cox's vocals lack the powerful dynamics responsible for Houston's massive appeal. Radio formats across the board will, for certain, fall for this talented Canadian beauty." Jet magazine felt that Cox's "self-titled debut album skillfully presents her powerful talent to the listening audience. From the smooth groove of "Sentimental" to the heartfelt emotion of "Sound of My Tears," Cox shows her vocal versatility and range."

== Commercial performance ==
Released on September 12, 1995, Deborah Cox debuted at number 105 on the US Billboard 200 in the week of October 28, 1995 and peaked at number 102 a week later. It also reached number 25 on Billboard's Top R&B/Hip-Hop Albums and peaked atop the US Heatseekers Albums chart. On August 1, 1996, it was certified Gold by the Recording Industry Association of America (RIAA) for shipments figures in excess of 500,000 units. By August 1998, Deborah Cox had sold 293,000 copies in the United States, according to Nielsen Soundscan. In Canada, the album peaked at number 55 on RPM's Top Albums/CDs in the week of May 27, 1996. On June 26, 1996, it was certified Gold by Music Canada. It eventually reached Platinum status in February 1997 when it surpassed shipments figures of 100,000 units.

== Track listing ==
Deborah Cox track listing
No.	Title	Writer(s)	Producer(s)	Length
1.	"Sentimental"	Dallas Austin; Deborah Cox; Colin Wolfe	Austin	4:29
2.	"Who Do U Love"	Larry "Rock" Campbell; Vassal Benford	Campbell; Benford^{[a]}	4:23
3.	"I'm Your Natural Woman"	Daryl Simmons	Simmons	5:18
4.	"The Sound of My Tears"	Keith Crouch; Kipper Jones	Crouch	4:52
5.	"Call Me"	Cox; Benford; Lascelles Stephens	Benford; Vincent Herbert; Stephens^{[a]}	4:48
6.	"My Radio"	Austin	Austin	4:15
7.	"Never Gonna Break My Heart Again"	Diane Warren	Keith Thomas	4:11
8.	"It Could've Been You"	Cox; Stephens	Tim & Bob	4:56
9.	"My First Night with You"	Warren; Babyface	Babyface; Keith W. Andes	5:30
10.	"Just Be Good to Me"	Jimmy Jam; Terry Lewis	Austin; Tim & Bob	5:50
11.	"Who Do U Love" (Morales Mix)	Campbell; Benford	Campbell; Benford; David Morales^{[b]}	4:47
12.	"Where Do We Go from Here"	Campbell; Stephens	Vincent Herbert	4:17
Total length:				57:23

Japanese edition bonus track
No.	Title	Writer(s)	Producer(s)	Length
13.	"Sentimental" (Uptempo Mix)	Austin; Cox; Wolfe	Austin; John Robinson^{[b]}	4:21
Total length:				61:44

UK edition bonus track
No.	Title	Writer(s)	Producer(s)	Length
13.	"Sentimental" (Smooth Mix)	Austin; Cox; Wolfe	Austin; Francis Buckley^{[b]}	4:32
Total length:				61:55

=== 2012 re-release ===
In 2012, the album was remastered and re-released in the UK by New Skool Sounds as a two-disc deluxe edition with 16 additional tracks.

Disc 1
No.	Title	Writer(s)	Producer(s)	Length
13.	"Sentimental" (Smooth Mix)	Austin; Cox; Wolfe	Austin; Francis Buckley^{[b]}	4:32
14.	"Who Do U Love" (Driza Bone Extended Mix)	Campbell; Benford	Campbell; Benford; Driza Bone^{[b]}	5:10
15.	"Sentimental" (Groove Mix)	Austin; Cox; Wolfe	Austin; Robinson^{[b]}	4:10
16.	"Who Do U Love" (Gass Mix)	Campbell; Benford	Campbell; Benford; Jon Gass^{[b]}	4:26

Disc 2
No.	Title	Writer(s)	Producer(s)	Length
1.	"Who Do U Love" (David Morales Down Low Dub)	Campbell; Benford	Campbell; Benford; Morales^{[b]}	6:11
2.	"It Could've Been You" (David Morales Club Mix)	Cox; Stephens	Tim & Bob; Morales^{[b]}	11:06
3.	"Who Do U Love" (David Morales Boss Drums Dub)	Campbell; Benford	Campbell; Benford; Morales^{[b]}	5:00
4.	"Sentimental" (Uno Clio Dub)	Austin; Cox; Wolfe	Austin; Uno Clio^{[b]}	8:08
5.	"Who Do U Love" (Driza Bone Remix)	Campbell; Benford	Campbell; Benford; Driza Bone^{[b]}	4:08
6.	"Just Be Good to Me" (V-Men Vocal Dub)	Jam; Lewis	Austin; Tim & Bob; Johnny "Vicious"^{[b]}	8:03
7.	"Sentimental" (E-Smoove House Dub)	Austin; Cox; Wolfe	Austin; E-Smoove^{[b]}	5:32
8.	"Who Do U Love" (David Morales Classic Club Mix)	Campbell; Benford	Campbell; Benford; Morales^{[b]}	8:42
9.	"Just Be Good to Me" (Div-A-Pella)	Jam; Lewis	Austin; Tim & Bob; Johnny "Vicious"^{[b]}	6:34
10.	"It Could've Been You" (Mass Avenue Hip Hop Remix)	Cox; Stephens	Tim & Bob; Andre Evans^{[b]}; Bob Antoine^{[b]}	4:16
11.	"Sentimental" (Bounce Mix)	Austin; Cox; Wolfe	Austin; John Robinson^{[b]}	4:05
12.	"Who Do U Love" (Chucky Thompson's Hip Hop Mix)	Campbell; Benford	Campbell; Benford; Chucky Thompson^{[b]}	3:48

Notes

- ^{^a} denotes co-producer(s)
- ^{^b} denotes additional producer(s)

== Personnel ==
Credits adapted from the liner notes of Deborah Cox.

- Keith Andes – keyboards
- Dallas Austin – composer, guest artist, multi instruments
- Babyface – guest artist, keyboards
- Vassal Benford – composer
- Lisa Bernard – vocals (background)
- Darryl Brundidge – keyboards
- Deborah Cox – composer, primary artist, vocals
- Keith Crouch – composer, keyboards, percussion
- Valerie Davis – vocals (background)
- Ada Dyer – vocals (background)
- Derrick Edmondson – saxophone
- Sherree Ford-Payne – guest artist, vocals (background)
- Dean Gant – synthesizer
- Ronnie Garrett – bass
- Ben Garrison – drums
- Mark Hammond – drums
- James Harris – composer
- Vincent Herbert – drums
- Kipper Jones – composer
- Tim Kelly – drums, keyboards
- Debra Killings – vocals (background)
- Terry Lewis – composer
- Alvin Parker – organ
- Scherrie Payne – vocals (background)
- Bob Robinson – keyboards
- Rick Sheppard – synthesizer
- Daryl Simmons – drums, keyboards
- Tann Simmons – vocals (background)
- Sam Simms – bass
- John Jubu Smith – guitar
- Lascelles Stephens – composer
- Vance Taylor – piano
- Keith Thomas – bass, synthesizer
- Michael Thompson – guitar
- Audrey Wheeler – guest artist, vocals (background)
- Colin Wolfe – bass, composer
- Val Young – vocals (background)

== Charts ==
Chart performance for Deborah Cox
Chart (1995)	Peak position
Australian Albums (ARIA)	66
Canada Top Albums/CDs (RPM)	55
New Zealand Albums (RMNZ)	49
US Billboard 200	102
US Heatseekers Albums (Billboard)	1
US Top R&B/Hip-Hop Albums (Billboard)	25

== Certifications ==
Certifications for Deborah Cox
Region	Certification	Certified units/sales
Canada (Music Canada)	Platinum	100,000^{^}
United States (RIAA)	Gold	500,000^{^}
^{^} Shipments figures based on certification alone.
