= Absolutely Not =

2001 single by Deborah Cox

Single by Deborah Cox

from the album Dr. Dolittle 2
- Released: June 26, 2001
- Length: 4:06
- Label: J
- Songwriters: Eric Johnson; Darren Christopher Jennings; Ahmad Russell; Tiffany Palmer; Eric Jones; James Glasco
- Producers: Eric "Donovan East" Johnson; D. Christopher "Dip Q" Jennings

Deborah Cox singles chronology
"We Can't Be Friends" (1999)	"Absolutely Not" (2001)	"Mr. Lonely" (2002)

"Absolutely Not" is a song by the Canadian singer Deborah Cox. It was written by Eric Johnson, Darren Christopher Jennings, Ahmad Russell, Tiffany Palmer, Eric Jones, and James Glasco and produced by Johnson and Jennings for the soundtrack to the comedy film Dr. Dolittle 2 (2001). Released as a single in June 2001, "Absolutely Not" was most successful on the US Billboard Dance Club Play chart, where remixes by Hex Hector spent two weeks at number one in September of that year.

In 2002, "Absolutely Not" was nominated for a Juno Award for Best Dance Recording, losing to Hatiras's "Spaced Invader". Hex Hector's "Chanel Mix" was later included on Cox's 2002 studio album The Morning After. In 2020, the Hex Hector remix of the song was used as a Lipsync for Your Life number in the third episode of Canada's Drag Race, in which Cox was a guest host.

== Charts ==
=== Weekly charts ===
Chart (2001)	Peak position
US Dance Club Songs (Billboard)	1

=== Year-end charts ===
Chart (2001)	Position
US Dance Club Play (Billboard)	12

== See also ==
- Number-one dance hits of 2001 (USA)
