= Sentimental (Deborah Cox song) =

1995 single by Deborah Cox

Single by Deborah Cox

from the album Deborah Cox
- Released: September 21, 1995
- Length: 4:29
- Label: Arista
- Songwriters: Dallas Austin; Deborah Cox; Colin Wolfe
- Producer: Dallas Austin

Deborah Cox singles chronology
"Sentimental" (1995)	"Who Do U Love" (1995)

Music video
- "Sentimental" on YouTube

"Sentimental" is a song by Canadian singer-songwriter Deborah Cox. It was written by Cox, Colin Wolfe, and Dallas Austin for her self-titled debut studio album (1995), while production was helmed by Austin. Released as the album's lead single by Arista Records, it became a top-40 success in Canada and the United Kingdom while peaking at number 27 on the US Billboard Hot 100 and number four on the Billboard Hot R&B Singles chart.

== Critical reception ==
Gil L. Robertson IV from Cash Box wrote, "This single is an impressive debut for Arista Records new soul diva. Throughout this mid-tempo track Cox delivers crisp, confident vocals that gives the song a winning edge. Expect wide urban airplay with some pop possibilities as well."

== Music video ==
A music video for "Sentimental" was directed by American director Brett Ratner. It starts off with actor Omar Epps, co-starring as Cox's ex love interest. He is seen entering a restaurant where she is to be performing. She is shown backstage, getting ready, where she is unaware of his presence. She then goes onstage and performs, and the crowd loves it. She then goes backstage afterwards and continues singing until she drops her head. He appears in the doorway and she looks up and sees him. The visuals earned Cox a nomination for Best New Artist Clip at the 1996 Billboard Music Video Awards.

== Track listings ==
CD single
No.	Title	Writer(s)	Producer(s)	Length
1.	"Sentimental"	Dallas Austin; Deborah Cox; Colin Wolfe	Austin	4:32
2.	"My Radio"	Austin	Austin	4:17

CD maxi-single
No.	Title	Writer(s)	Producer(s)	Length
1.	"Sentimental" (Uptempo mix)	Austin; Cox; Wolfe	Austin; John Robinson^{[a]}	8:00
2.	"Sentimental" (Groove mix)	Austin; Cox; Wolfe	Austin; Robinson^{[a]}	4:10
3.	"Sentimental" (Bounce mix)	Austin; Cox; Wolfe	Austin; Robinson^{[a]}	4:05
4.	"Sentimental" (Smooth mix)	Austin; Cox; Wolfe	Austin; Eric Miller^{[a]}	4:32
5.	"Sentimental" (E-Smoove house dub)	Austin; Cox; Wolfe	Austin; Miller^{[a]}	5:32
6.	"Sentimental" (Uno Clio dub)	Austin; Cox; Wolfe	Austin; Uno Clio^{[a]}	8:08

Notes

- ^{^a} denotes additional producer(s)

== Charts ==
=== Weekly charts ===
Weekly chart performance for "Sentimental"
Chart (1995)	Peak position
Australia (ARIA)	49
Canada Top Singles (RPM)	33
Europe (Eurochart Hot 100)	83
Europe (European Dance Radio)	21
Netherlands (Singles Top 100 Tiparade)	12
New Zealand (Recorded Music NZ)	46
Scottish Singles Sales (Official Charts)	80
UK Singles (Official Charts)	34
UK Dance (Official Charts)	12
UK Hip Hop/R&B (Official Charts)	4
US Billboard Hot 100	27
US Dance Singles Sales (Billboard)	4
US Hot R&B/Hip-Hop Songs (Billboard)	4
US Rhythmic Airplay (Billboard)	38
US Cash Box Top 100	24

=== Year-end charts ===
Year-end chart performance for "Sentimental"
Chart (1995)	Position
US Hot R&B Singles (Billboard)	52

== Release history ==
Release dates and formats for "Sentimental"
Region	Date	Format(s)	Label(s)	Ref.
Japan	September 21, 1995	Mini-CD	Arista	
United States	September 26, 1995	12-inch vinyl; CD; cassette	Arista	
Finland	October 23, 1995	CD	Arista	
Australia	October 30, 1995	CD; cassette	Arista	
United Kingdom	October 30, 1995	12-inch vinyl; CD; cassette	Arista	
