= Deborah Cox =

Canadian musician and actress (born 1974)

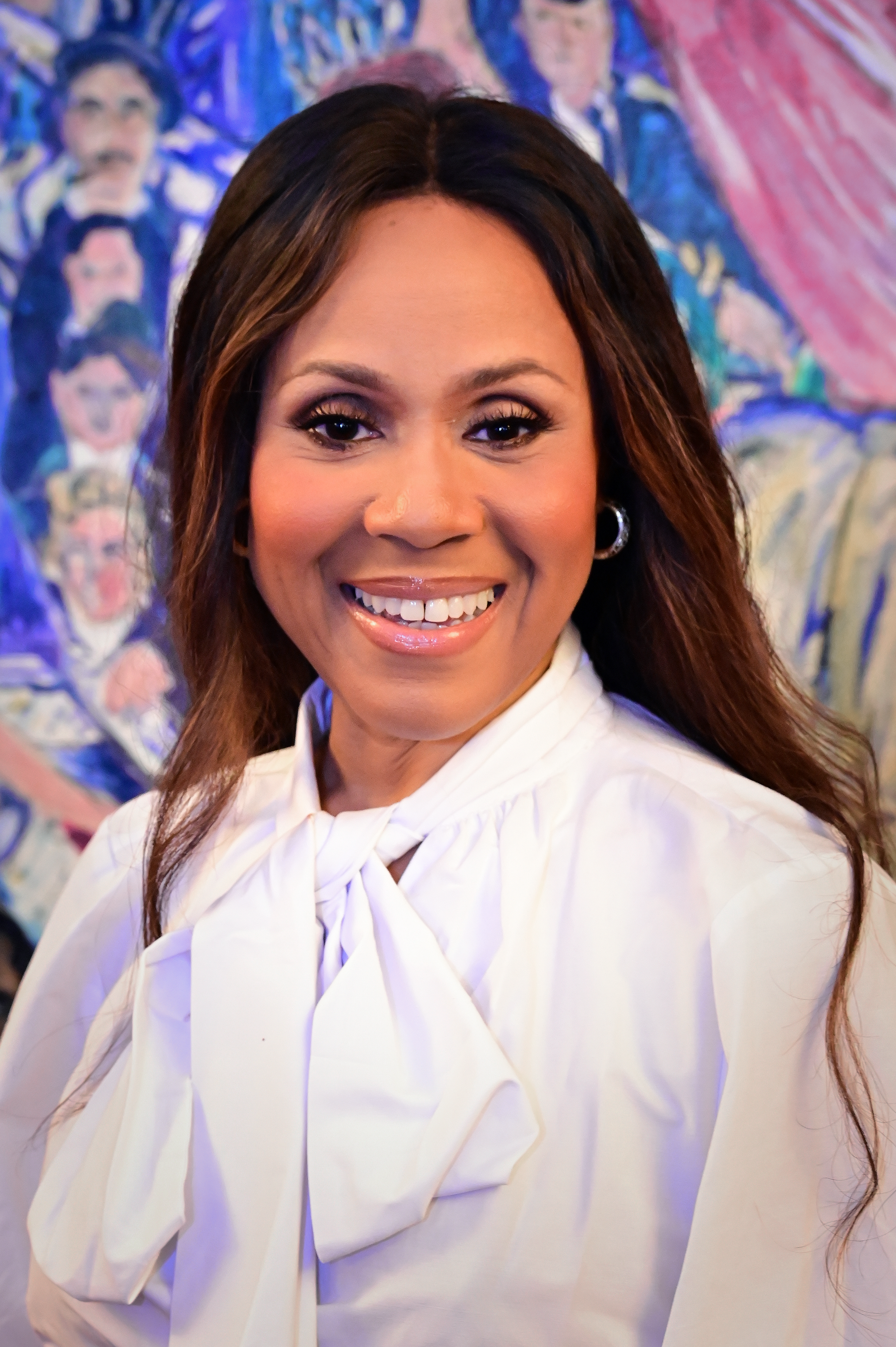
- Cox in 2026

Background information
- Born: July 13, 1974 (age 52); Toronto, Ontario, Canada
- Genres: R&B; pop; soul; hip-hop; dance; jazz
- Occupations: Singer; songwriter; actress; producer
- Years active: 1987–present
- Website: deborahcox.com

Deborah Cox (born July 13, 1974) is a Canadian singer, songwriter, actress, and record producer. Born and raised in Toronto, she began performing on television commercials at age 12, and entered various talent shows in her teenage years before becoming a professional backing vocalist for Celine Dion. In 1994, Cox relocated to the United States and was signed to Arista Records by Clive Davis, releasing her self-titled debut album the following year. Her second studio album, One Wish (1998), was certified platinum in the United States. It was marked by the commercial success of the pop crossover single "Nobody's Supposed to Be Here", which would become her most successful entry on the Billboard Hot 100 chart, peaking at number two and remaining there for eight consecutive weeks. Cox signed with J Records for her third studio album The Morning After (2002), which saw moderate commercial success.

Cox ventured into acting in the 2000s, making her film debut in the Canadian drama film Love Come Down (2000) and her stage debut in 2004, in the title role in the Broadway musical Aida. She has since appeared in smaller films and several musical productions, including the horror-drama Jekyll & Hyde, the biographical musical Josephine, the musical adaptation of The Bodyguard, and the 2023 revival of The Wiz. Cox's most recent studio albums, Destination Moon (2007) and The Promise (2008), have been released through her own independent record label, Deco Recording Group. In 2017, her single "Let the World Be Ours Tonight" became her 13th number-one hit on Billboard's Dance Club Songs over the span of three consecutive decades. In 2016, Billboard listed Cox at 23rd on its list of the Greatest of All Time Top Dance Club Artists. An eight-time Juno Award nominee, she has won four awards and is often cited as Canada's top R&B artist. She received her first Grammy Award nomination for The Wiz in the Best Musical Theater Album category in 2025, while the following year she produced and starred in the Broadway production Titanique, earning a nomination for the Tony Award for Best Musical.

Cox was inducted into the Canadian Music Hall of Fame in 2022.

== Early life ==
Deborah Cox was born to Guyanese parents in Toronto, grew up in Scarborough, was raised Catholic, and attended John XXIII Catholic Elementary School and Earl Haig Secondary School. She began singing on TV commercials at age 12, and entered various talent shows including an appearance on Tiny Talent Time. She performed in nightclubs as a teenager, and began to write music around the same time. Cox entered the music industry in the early 1990s, performing as a backup vocalist for Celine Dion for six months. In 1992, she also appeared on Devon's LP titled It's My Nature on the track "That's A Friend." After receiving many rejection letters from Canadian record labels that claimed their "quota" had been reached, Cox moved to Los Angeles in 1994 with producer and songwriting partner, Lascelles Stephens.

== Career ==
=== 1995–1999: Debut and One Wish ===
In late 1994, label executive Clive Davis signed Cox to Arista Records. Featuring production from Dallas Austin, Keith Crouch, Tim & Bob, and Kenneth "Babyface" Edmonds, she released her self-titled debut album the following year. A middling commercial and critical success, the album peaked at number 102 on US Billboard 200 but emerged as a steady seller, eventually receiving a gold certification by the Recording Industry Association of America (RIAA), while going platinum in Canada. Lead single "Sentimental" entered the top five on the US Hot R&B/Hip-Hop Songs, while follow-up "Who Do U Love" attained worldwide success, becoming a top twenty success in Australia, New Zealand and the US, also reaching the top of Billboard's Dance Club Songs. In 1996, Deborah Cox won Cox a Juno Award for Best R&B/Soul Recording at the annual award ceremony and earned her a Best Soul/R&B New Artist nomination at the 1996 American Music Awards.

Cox contributed the non-album song "Things Just Ain't The Same" to the soundtrack to the 1997 film Money Talks. A dance remix of the song, produced by Hex Hector, became her second number-one hit on Billboard's Dance Club Songs chart and was included on her second album, 1998's One Wish. As with her self-titled debut album, her sophomore effort was once again executive-produced by Davis, but featured more uptempo, contemporary R&B, and a slew of new producers and personnel to incorporate dance and club music, including Montell Jordan, Anthony "Shep" Crawford, Rodney "Darkchild" Jerkins, and DJ Quik. One Wish peaked at number 72 on the Billboard 200 and earned a platinum certification from the RIAA, while reaching gold status in Canada. The album capitalized on the crossover success of lead single "Nobody's Supposed to Be Here" which became Cox's most successful entry on the Billboard Hot 100, peaking at number two, and remaining there for eight consecutive weeks, making it one of the longest stays at number two in chart history. The song also reached number one on the Hot R&B/Hip-Hop Songs, spending a then record-breaking 14 weeks at number one, while the third single "We Can't Be Friends," a duet with R. L. Huggar, reached the top ten, with "It's Over Now" and "I Never Knew" become chart-toppers on the Dance Club Songs chart.

=== 2000–2005: The Morning After and acting career ===
After One Wish, Cox collaborated with singer Whitney Houston on her single "Same Script, Different Cast" from the compilation album Whitney: The Greatest Hits. Incorporating a backing track of Ludwig van Beethoven's "Für Elise" during the intro, it was released as a radio-only promo single and became a minor hit on Billboard Hot 100, peaking at number 70 while reaching number 14 on Hot R&B/Hip-Hop Songs. In 2000, Cox made her acting debut when she starred in Clement Virgo's Canadian drama film Love Come Down, playing a nightclub singer. The film garnered eight nominations at the 21st Genie Awards, including two Best Original Song nominations for Cox's songs "29" and "Our Love". In 2001, Cox then recorded "Absolutely Not", for the soundtrack to Dr. Dolittle 2 which became her sixth number one hit on Billboard's Dance Club Songs.

Cox's third album The Morning After was released in November 2002 on J Records following a frustratingly long departure from Arista. It marked the Cox's first record under Clive Davis's label, with Davis, once more serving as executive producer. Keen to build on the success of her previous album One Wish, he enlisted the help of producers such as Jimmy Jam and Terry Lewis, Jermaine Dupri, Rodney "Darkchild" Jerkins, and Shep Crawford as well as up-and-coming producers Warryn Campbell, Johntá Austin and Alex Richbourg to work with Cox. A blend of urban R&B and adult contemporary songs with additional dance/house tracks, it became her highest-charting album on the US Billboard 200 and Billboard's Top R&B/Hip-Hop Albums yet, debuting and peaking at number 38 and number seven, respectively. Commercially, the album was less successful than her previous album, however, though it produced two singles on the US Dance Club Songs chart, including "Mr. Lonely" and "Play Your Part".

In February 2004, Cox made her Broadway debut in the Elton John-Tim Rice musical Aida when she replaced singer Michelle Williams in her role of the Nubian princess. Her four-month engagement earned largely positive reviews. The same year, she recorded and released a dance remix of the musical's theme song "Easy As Life" as a promotional single. In 2005, Cox starred in the films Blood of a Champion and Love on Layaway. Also that year, her voice was featured in the movie Hotel Rwanda in the song "Nobody Cares". To sustain demand for Cox's club appearances, while focused on her family and new album projects, she released a dance single titled "House Is Not a Home" on Nervous Records in January 2006. Later in the year, her song "Definition of Love" was used in the movie Akeelah and the Bee, but was not released as a single.

=== 2006–2009: Destination Moon and The Promise ===
Between 2005 and 2006 Deborah recorded her fourth album, called Destination Moon, arranged and produced by Rob Mounsey. A tribute album to jazz singer Dinah Washington, Cox noted it a concept album that she had in mind for years. Most of the album was recorded live with a forty-piece orchestra with Rob Mounsey arranging. Eventually released by Decca Records in June 2017, Destination Moon peaked at number three on the Billboard Top Jazz Albums. The same year, Cox co-starred alongside Golden Brooks and Darius McCrary in Leslie Small's film A Good Man is Hard to Find. Based on the musical stage play of the same name, the comedy depicts the story of three women who each undergo romantic crises that challenge their personal and spiritual relationships. In 2008, Cox performed the Canadian national anthem at the NBA All-Star Game in New Orleans, receiving rave reviews. She also contributed the song "This Gift" to the soundtrack of the 2008 romantic drama film Meet the Browns, directed by Tyler Perry, and served as a supporting act on Cyndi Lauper's True Colors Tour 2008.

Also that year, Cox finished work on her sixth studio album The Promise, released on November 11, 2008, through Deco Recording Group, Cox's own independent label, with distribution handled by Image Entertainment. A breakaway from her previous album, it marked her return to R&B music and saw her working with a wider number of songwriters and producers on the album, including The Avila Brothers, Jimmy Jam and Terry Lewis, Devo Springsteen, Big Jim, and Shep Crawford. The Promise debuted at number 106 on the US Billboard 200, number 14 on the Top R&B/Hip-Hop Albums, and number 95 on the Canadian Albums Chart. Earning generally mixed to positive reviews from music critics, it was nominated for R&B/Soul Recording of the Year at the 2009 Juno Awards. The second single "Beautiful U R" marked her biggest hit since "Nobody's Supposed to Be Here," becoming a top ten hit in Canada, where it was certified platinum by Music Canada, as well as her tenth chart-topper on the Billboard' Dance Club Songs. In support of the album, Cox joined forces with American R&B singer Kenny Lattimore for the joint Timeless Promise Tour in July 2009. Also in 2009, she was featured on the single "Leave the World Behind", a house track produced by four DJs Axwell, Steve Angello, Sebastian Ingrosso and Laidback Luke.

=== 2010–2017: The Queen Project, dance music and Broadway ===
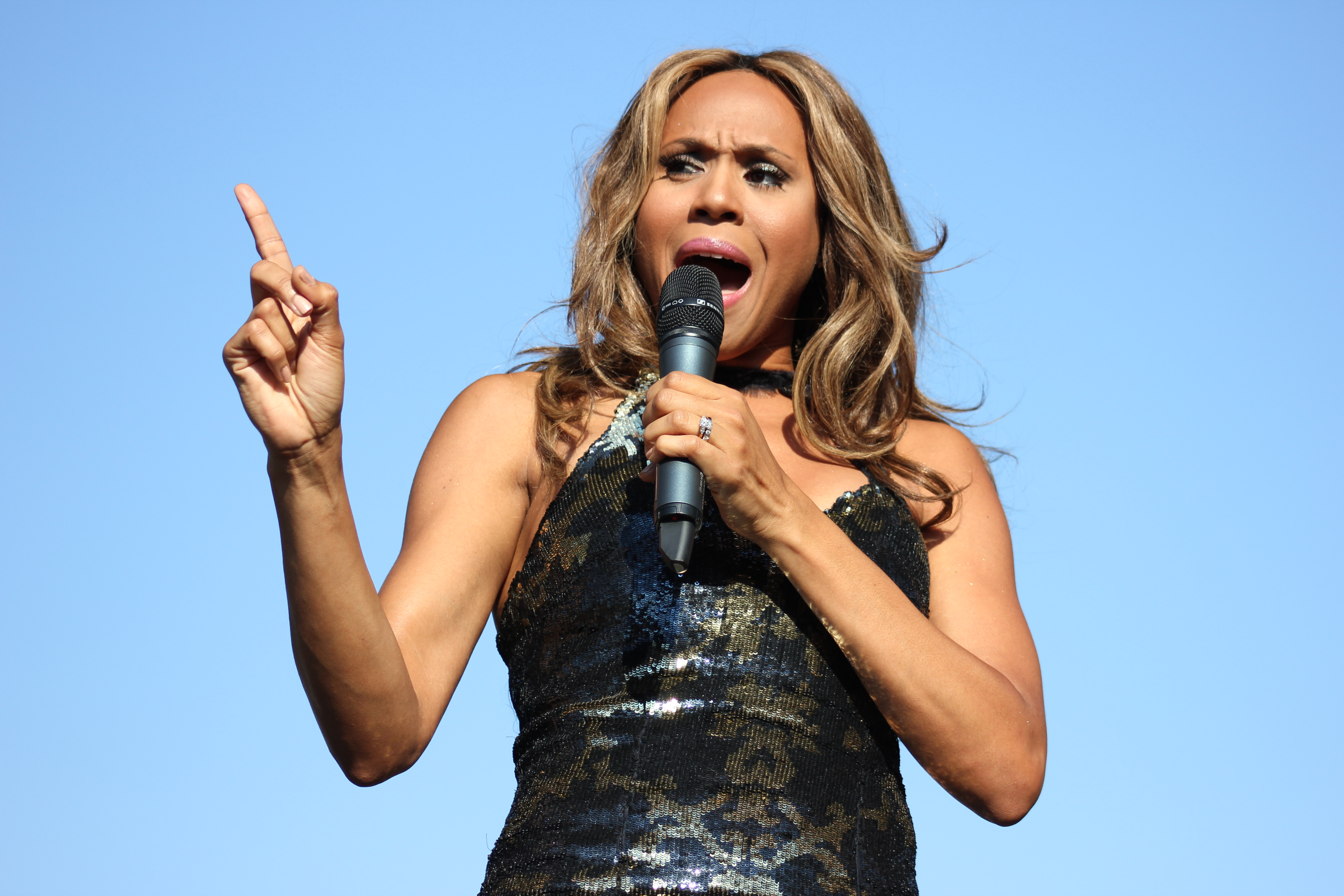
Cox performing at the Capital Pride in Washington, D.C. in 2012

In 2010, it was announced that Cox would be joining fellow R&B singers Kelly Price and Tamia to form a supergroup. While the trio recorded several tracks together, their joint album The Queen Project eventually failed to materialize due timing issues and label politics. In 2011, Cox released the dance-heavy single "If It Wasn't for Love" through Deco Entertainment. It became her eleventh chart topper on Billboard's Dance Club Songs and was to precede a new studio album which remained unreleased. In September 2012, Cox gave her inaugural performance as the female lead Lucy in a revival of the musical Jekyll & Hyde which toured North America for twenty-five weeks. While the show enjoyed a limited Broadway run only, Cox received positive reviews for her performance. Also in 2012, she collaborated with rapper Akon on the song "No Labels", the official anthem of the same-titled American bipartisan political organization. The following year, Cox collaborated with DJ Paige on the non-album single "Higher". Released on March 18, through Electronic Kingdom Records, it became her twelfth number-one hit on the US Dance Club Songs chart. In 2014, Cox was one of the performers at the opening ceremonies of WorldPride in Toronto, alongside Melissa Etheridge, Tom Robinson and Steve Grand.

In 2015, she provided vocals for the made for television biographical film Whitney, directed by Angela Bassett based on American recording artist Whitney Houston. Cox performed all of Houston's vocals in the film, including "I Will Always Love You", "I'm Your Baby Tonight", and "The Greatest Love of All." The same year, she released the deep house-influenced "Kinda Miss You", as well as the ballad "More Than I Knew" as singles. Both were set to appear on her sixth album Work of Art, initially announced for an August 2015 release through Deco and Primary Wave Music. However, after several delays, the album remained unreleased. In 2016, Cox played the lead role of Josephine Baker in the Broadway-bound musical Josephine, which chronicled the singer's life between the years of 1939 and 1945, and starred as Rachel Marron in the North American Tour of the musical The Bodyguard based on the 1992 film of the same name. In support of the musical, Cox released the EP I Will Always Love You on Deco and Broadway Records, containing cover versions of seven Whitney Houston originals as well as Houston's cover of Dolly Parton's "I Will Always Love You." In June 2017, she released an uptempo dance single "Let the World Be Ours Tonight" during LGBTQ pride season on Radikal Records and Galactic Media. It marked her 13th single to top Billboard's Dance Club Songs.

=== 2018–present: Seventh studio album and television films ===
In June 2019, Cox performed at Stonewall 50 – WorldPride NYC 2019, marking the 50th anniversary of the 1969 Stonewall riots. In November 2019, she released the Rico Love-produced single "Easy Way" through Deco Entertainment. The song was expected to lead her yet-unreleased seventh studio album, initially expected to be released in late 2020. It was followed by the Christmas single "Gimme Gimme Gimme Some Christmas" a month later. In February 2020, Cox starred opposite Roger Guenveur Smith in the BET+ television thriller Influence, an adaption of Carl Weber's same-titled 2018 novel, portraying a big-name celebrity singer accused of killing her husband. Also in 2020, she appeared as a guest host in an episode of Canada's Drag Race and started a webseries titled COXtales with Deborah Cox during the global COVID-19 pandemic. In fall 2020, Cox released further two Christmas singles, the original song "I Really Don't Want Much for Christmas" and a rendition of the Eartha Kitt song "Santa Baby."

In 2020, Cox was appointed Executive Director of Alpha Magazines, a U.S.-based lifestyle and entertainment publication.

In 2021, Cox was added to the BET series First Wives Club during its second season, playing the role of musician Regina alongside Michelle Buteau and Jill Scott. The same year, she co-starred as Wendy in the HBO Max post-apocalyptic dystopian fiction miniseries Station Eleven, and appeared on "Summer of Love," another collaboration with Israeli producer Offer Nissim. In 2022, Cox was announced as an inductee into the Canadian Music Hall of Fame, becoming the first Black woman to be inducted. Beginning in September 2023, Cox starred as Glinda in a US revival of The Wiz, touring nationally in advance of a March 2024 Broadway opening.

Beginning in March 2026, Cox starred as "The Unsinkable" Molly Brown in the Broadway musical Titanique.

== Personal life ==
Cox currently lives in Miami, Florida. She is married to her high school sweetheart and manager, Lascelles Stephens. They have three children: a son, Isaiah (born July 1, 2003) and two daughters, Sumayah (born June 29, 2006), and Kaila Michelle (born February 23, 2009).

== Discography ==
- Deborah Cox (1995)
- One Wish (1998)
- The Morning After (2002)
- Destination Moon (2007)
- The Promise (2008)

== Filmography ==
=== Film ===
Year	Title	Role	Notes
2000	Love Come Down	Niko Rosen	Nominated — Canadian Screen Award for Best Original Song ("Our Love"); Nominated — Canadian Screen Award for Best Original Song ("29")
2005	Blood of a Champion	Sharon	
2005	Love on Layaway	Monique	
2008	A Good Man Is Hard to Find	Charlene	
2020	Influence	Savannah Kirby	
2023	This Time	Blue Mahoney	

=== Television ===
Year	Title	Role	Notes
2000	Nash Bridges	Vanessa Swan	Episode: "Hit and Run"
2020	Canada's Drag Race	Herself	Episode: "Not Sorry Aboot It"
2021	Ruby	Mrs. Thibodeau	Television film
2021–2022	First Wives Club	Regina Crowell	12 episodes
2021–2022	Station Eleven	Wendy	5 episodes

== Awards and nominations ==
1996

- Won: Juno Award for Best R&B/Soul Recording (Deborah Cox).
- Nominated: American Music Award for Favorite New Artist – Soul/Rhythm & Blues.

1997

- Nominated: Juno Award for Best Female Vocalist.

1998

- Won: Juno Award for Best R&B/Soul Recording ("Things Just Ain't the Same").
- Won: Soul Train Award for Best R&B/Soul Single – Female ("Nobody's Supposed to Be Here").

1999

- Won: Juno Award for Best R&B/Soul Recording (One Wish).
- Nominated: Juno Award for Best Female Vocalist.
- Won: Soul Train Lady of Soul Award for Best R&B/Soul Song of the Year ("Nobody's Supposed to Be Here").

2000

- Nominated: Genie Award for Best Original Song ("Our Love" and "29" from Love Come Down).
- Nominated: Soul Train Award for Best R&B/Soul Single – Group, Band or Duo ("Same Script, Different Cast" feat. Whitney Houston).
- Nominated: Image Award for Outstanding Female Artist ("We Can't Be Friends")

2002

- Nominated: Juno Award for Best Dance Recording ("Absolutely Not").

2008

- Nominated: Juno Award for Vocal Jazz Album of the Year (Destination Moon).
- Received a star on walk of fame, in Toronto's Scarborough Town Centre.

2009

- Nominated: Juno Award for R&B/Soul Recording of the Year (The Promise).

2022

- Inducted into Canadian Music Hall of Fame

2024

- Nominated: Broadway.com Audience Award for Favorite Diva Performance (The Wiz)

2025

- Nominated: Grammy Award for Best Musical Theater Album (The Wiz)

2026

- Nominated: Tony Award for Best Musical (Titanique)

== See also ==
- List of number-one dance hits (United States)
- List of artists who reached number one on the US Dance chart
