= Alexandra Elbakyan =

Kazakh computer scientist and founder of Sci-Hub

- Александра Элбакян
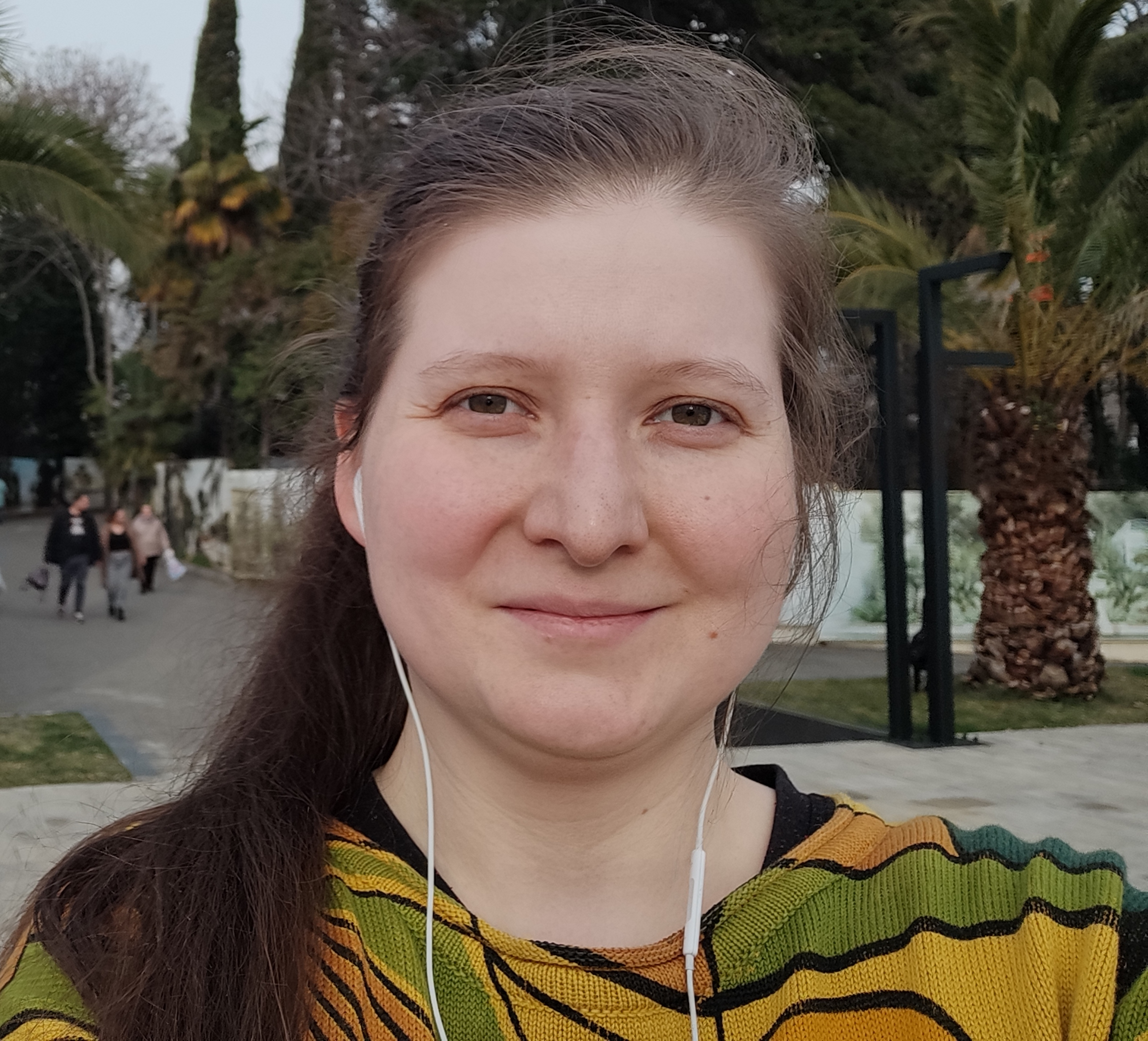
- Elbakyan in 2021
- Born: 6 November 1988 (age 38); Alma-Ata, Kazakh SSR, Soviet Union (now Almaty, Kazakhstan)
- Education: Satbayev University (BS); Saint Petersburg State University (MS)
- Occupations: Scientific activist; Researcher; Security hacker
- Known for: Sci-Hub and Sci-Net
- Movement: Open Access
- Scientific career
- Fields: Neural engineering, Computer science
- Website: sci-hub.ru/alexandra (archived 2025-05-19)

Alexandra Asanovna Elbakyan (Russian: Алекса́ндра Аса́новна Элбакя́н; Armenian: Ալեքսանդրա Ասանովնա Էլբակյան; born 6 November 1988) is a Kazakhstani computer programmer, multidisciplinary academic, and the creator of the website Sci-Hub, which provides free access to research papers . Sci-Hub provides access to nearly all scholarly literature published before 2020, but a much lower proportion of those published since then.

Elbakyan has been described as "Science's Pirate Queen". In 2016, Nature included her in their list of the top ten "people who mattered" in science. Since 2011, she has been living in Russia.

== Early life ==
Elbakyan was born in Almaty, Kazakh Soviet Socialist Republic, on 6 November 1988. She identifies as multiracial, with Armenian, Slavic and Asian roots. Alexandra was raised by a single mother, who was an accomplished computer programmer.

Alexandra started programming at the age of 12, making web pages in HTML and later writing in PHP, Delphi, and assembly languages. She attempted to create a Tamagotchi powered by artificial intelligence. She performed her first computer hack at the age of 14; using SQL injection, she obtained access to all logins and passwords of her home internet provider. Later, she discovered there were more vulnerabilities of the cross-site scripting type. She reported these issues to the internet provider, hoping to get a job with them; they cut off her internet access instead. Alexandra wrote in her blog that she first hacked a publisher's website when she was 16. The publisher was MIT Press, which published online books on neuroscience, but they were locked behind a paywall that she could not afford. Alexandra wrote a PHP program that exploited a vulnerability on the website to download paywalled books without payment.

== Education ==
In 2009, she obtained a Bachelor of Science degree in computer science from the Satbayev University, specializing in information security. She studied the possibility of using brainwaves measured using electroencephalography (EEG) for authentication instead of using a password. While working on her thesis, Elbakyan discovered the paywall problem with accessing journal articles, as her university did not have access to many publications related to her work.

Alexandra became interested in developing brain–computer interfaces and in 2010 she joined the University of Freiburg to work on such a project, which eventually led to her summer internship in neuroscience at Georgia Institute of Technology in the United States. The same year, Elbakyan spoke at the Humanity+ Summit at Harvard on the topic "Brain-Computer Interfacing, Consciousness, and the Global Brain". Elbakyan's idea was to develop a new kind of brain-machine interface that would merge human and machine qualia. She also participated in the Towards a Science of Consciousness conference that was held in Tucson, Arizona with the poster "Consciousness in Mixed Systems: Merging Artificial and Biological Minds via Brain-Machine Interface".

From 2012 to 2014, she was a master's student at Higher School of Economics in Moscow, but then dropped out. According to a 2016 interview, her neuroscience research was on hold, but she was enrolled in a history of science master's program at a private university in an undisclosed location. Her thesis would focus on scientific communication. Later, she has focused more on religious topics, and in 2019, she graduated from Saint Petersburg State University with a master's degree in linguistics on the topic of biblical languages.

== Sci-Hub ==
According to Elbakyan, Sci-Hub is a simplified version of a Global Brain because it "connects [the] brains of many researchers."

Elbakyan developed Sci-Hub in 2011, when she lived in Kazakhstan. It was characterized by Science correspondent John Bohannon as either "an awe-inspiring act of altruism or a massive criminal enterprise, depending on whom you ask." Elbakyan has stated that the project was initially intended to make access to academic papers fast and convenient, without a global goal of making all science free.

When academic publisher Elsevier sued Sci-Hub in the US in 2015, Elbakyan wrote a letter to the judge, wherein she explained her motives for starting the project: she could not afford to pay for each of the hundreds of papers she needed for her research project, so she had to pirate them. She founded her website to help others in the same situation. In the letter Elbakyan has provided various arguments in support for her cause, such as Elsevier not being an author of papers, and not paying the authors, mentioning that "The general opinion in research community is that research papers should be distributed for free (open access), not sold".

Elsevier was granted an injunction against her and $15 million in damages. Following a lawsuit, Elbakyan remained in hiding due to the risk of extradition. There were also lawsuits against Sci-Hub and Elbakyan from other publishers and in other countries.

On 17 February 2023, a court in India refused to dismiss a blocking application submitted by the legal representatives of the publishers; nonetheless, the legal representatives of Elbakyan are working on a new creative legal strategy, namely the mandatory economic angle. Additionally, the revoked .SE domain of Sci-Hub, in a different court case, has now been restored due to a successful "ownership verification process."

== Views ==
Elbakyan is a strong supporter of the open access movement. According to her, Sci-Hub is a true implementation of open access principle in science. She believes that science should be open to all and not behind paywalls.

She has described herself as a devout pirate and thinks that copyright law prevents the free exchange of information online and the free distribution of knowledge on the Internet. In 2018, she asked supporters of Sci-Hub to join their local Pirate Party in order to fight for copyright laws to be changed.

Elbakyan has stated that she is inspired by communist ideals, and considers the common ownership of ideas to be essential for scientific progress. In her 2016 interview to Vox, she said: "I like the idea of communism, and the idea that knowledge should be common and not intellectual property is very relevant. That is especially true for information. Research articles are used for communication in science. But the word 'communication' implies common ownership by itself." She referenced the work of Robert Merton, who considered communism to be a part of scientific ethos. According to her, Sci-Hub is fighting for communism in science and against the current state of things when knowledge has become the private property of corporations, because knowledge belongs to everyone.

Elbakyan does not strictly label herself a Marxist, but adopts much of its propositions. She wanted to join either the Communist Party of the Russian Federation or Pirate Party of Russia, but was unable to as membership in political parties is restricted to those with Russian citizenship.

Elbakyan justified Sci-Hub by saying that lack of universal access to academic knowledge violates Article 27 of the United Nations' Universal Declaration of Human Rights, which states that "everyone has the right freely to … share in scientific advancement and its benefits."

She has stated that she supports a strong state which can stand up to the Western world, and that she does not want "the scientists of Russia and of my native Kazakhstan to share the fates of the scientists of Iraq, Libya, and Syria, that were 'helped' by the United States to become more democratic." In 2012, she was a supporter for Putin's politics, but in 2018, she expressed support for the Pirate Party of Russia, which is in opposition to Putin. A few months before the Russian invasion of Ukraine in 2022, when asked in an interview if she was still loyal to Putin, she responded that she is neither aligned with Putin nor with the Russian liberal opposition, reiterating that she identifies herself first and foremost as a communist.

She has also done work on religion.

== Controversies ==
Elbakyan was in conflict with the liberal, pro-Western wing of the Russian scientific community. According to her interview, she was attacked on the Internet by 'science popularizers' who supported liberal views that led to the shutdown of Sci-Hub in Russia in 2017 for a few days. In particular, Elbakyan was strongly critical of the former Dynasty Foundation (shut down in 2015) and its associated figures. She believes that the foundation was politicized, tied to Russia's liberal opposition, and fit the legal definition of a "foreign agent". Dynasty's founder, in her opinion, financed researchers whose political views agreed with its own. Elbakyan states that after she began to investigate the foundation's activities and published her findings online, she became the target of a cyberharassment campaign by Dynasty's supporters.

In December 2019, The Washington Post reported that Elbakyan was under investigation by the US Justice Department for suspected ties to Russia's military intelligence arm — the GRU — to steal U.S. military secrets from defense contractors. Elbakyan has denied this, saying that Sci-Hub "...is not in any way directly affiliated with Russian or some other country's intelligence," but noting that "...of course, there could be some indirect help. The same as with donations, anyone can send them; they are completely anonymous, so I do not know who exactly is donating to Sci-Hub. There could be some help that I'm simply unaware of. I can only add that I write all of Sci-Hub code [sic] and design myself and I'm doing the server's configuration."

On May 8, 2021, Elbakyan tweeted that the FBI had served a subpoena to Apple seeking her iCloud data. The tweet included a screengrab of the notice from Apple. The tweet was retweeted by Edward Snowden, who commented:

"Members of Congress should be making calls about this. Journalists should be asking the White House and DOJ questions. The founder of Sci-hub — unquestionably one of the most important sites for academics in the world — should not be subject to persecution for their work."

== Recognition and awards ==
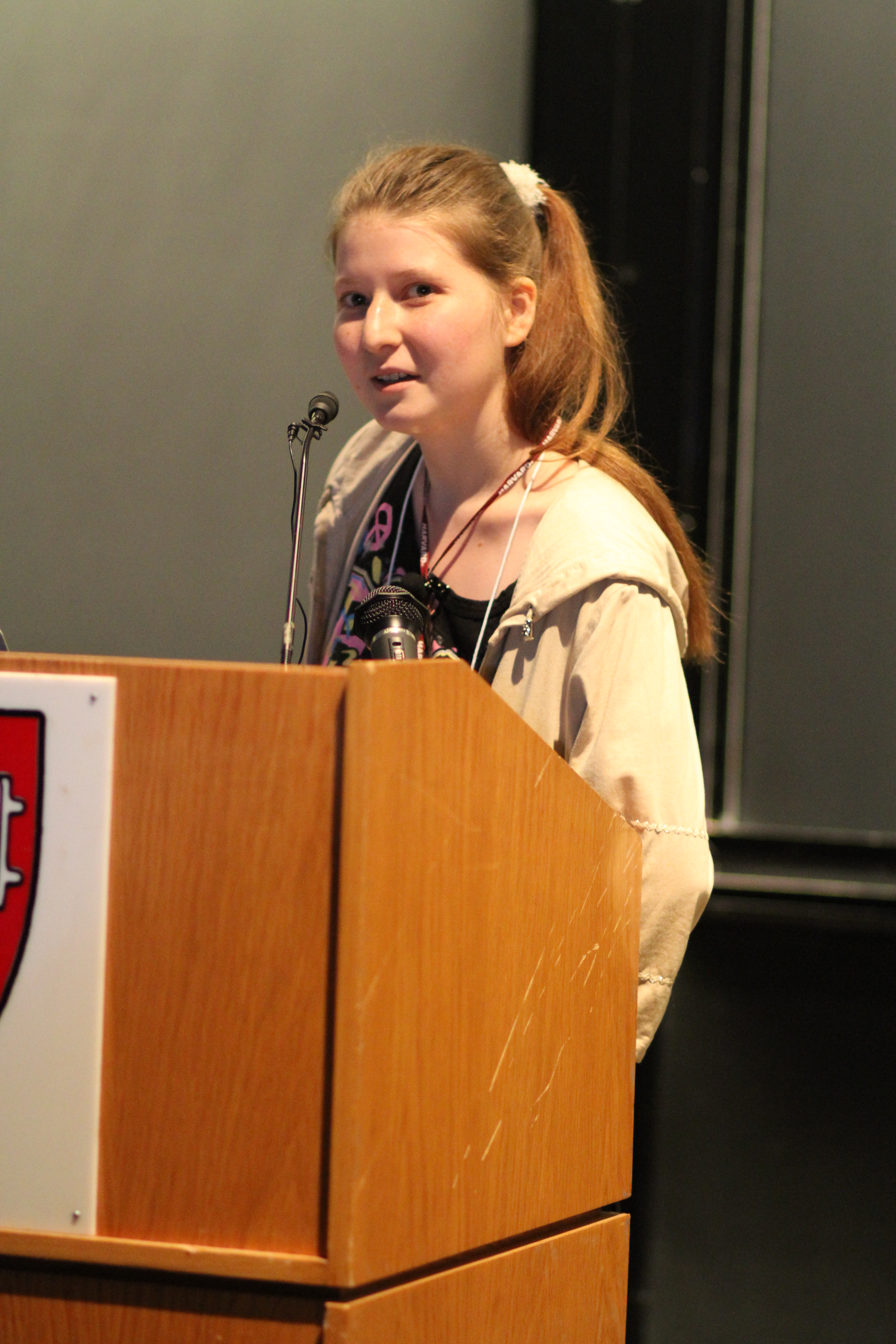
Elbakyan speaking at Harvard in 2010

In December 2016, Nature named Elbakyan as one of the 10 people who most mattered in science that year. Some researchers who use Sci-Hub thank Elbakyan in the acknowledgments section of their papers.

For her actions in creating Sci-Hub, Elbakyan has been called a hero, for example by Nobel laureate Randy Schekman. Ars Technica has compared her to Aaron Swartz, and The New York Times has compared her to Edward Snowden. Edward Snowden acknowledged Sci-Hub to be one of the most important websites for academics in the world. She has also been called a modern-day "Robin Hood", a "Robin Hood of science", and "Science's Pirate Queen".

Elbakyan has several biological species named in her honor:

- Idiogramma elbakyanae, a species of parasitoid wasps discovered by Russian and Mexican entomologists in 2017. Elbakyan was offended by this, saying that "the real parasites are scientific publishers, and Sci-Hub, on the contrary, fights for equal access to scientific information." The Russian entomologist responded that he supports Sci-Hub and naming was not an insult. The article says that "The species is named in honour of Alexandra Elbakyan (Kazakhstan/Russia), creator of the web-site Sci-Hub, in recognition of her contribution to making scientific knowledge available for all researchers."
- Brachyplatystoma elbakyani, an extinct species of catfish discovered by Argentine paleontologists in 2020.
- Spigelia elbakyaniae, a species of flowering plant from Mexico discovered in 2020. (At first Spigelia elbakyanii, then changed by the authors because the "correct termination, however, for an epithet dedicated to a woman (Alexandra Elbakyan) is -iae, instead of -ii".
- Amphisbaena elbakyanae, a species of worm lizard discovered in 2021.
- Sibogasyrinx elbakyanae, a species of deep-sea snail discovered by researchers from Russia and France in 2021.
- Hyloscirtus elbakyanae

Elbakyan was nominated twice for John Maddox Prize and made it to the final shortlist. Some researchers say that Elbakyan deserves a Nobel Prize for her work. Wildlife scientist T. R. Shankar Raman has stated in an interview:

"I am not a fan of the Nobel Prizes, given they have their own biases and have failed to adequately acknowledge scientific contributions of women, for example. But given that its stated purpose is to award those who have conferred the greatest benefit to humankind, Alexandra Elbakyan certainly qualifies."

In 2023 Elbakyan received the Award for Access to Scientific Knowledge from the Electronic Frontier Foundation for her "vital work in helping to ensure that technology supports freedom, justice, and innovation for all people."

== Works ==
- Elbakyan, Alexandra (24 February 2016). "Why Sci-Hub is the true solution for Open Access: reply to criticism".
- Elbakyan, Alexandra (20 May 2016). "Why Science is Better with Communism? The Case of Sci-Hub". Open Access Symposium 2016, University of North Texas.
- Elbakyan, Alexandra (2009) "Электроэнцефалограмма человека как биометрическая характеристика в системах контроля доступа" [Human EEG as a biometric feature in access control systems] Bachelor Thesis, Satbayev University.
- Elbakyan, Alexandra (2019) "Образ Духа Божьего в текстах еврейской Библии" [Image of the Holy Spirit in Hebrew Bible texts] Master Thesis, Saint Petersburg State University.

== See also ==
- Aaron Swartz
- Anna's Archive
- Copyright abolition
- ICanHazPDF
- Library Genesis
- Open Access
- Peter Sunde
- Z-Library
