= Link-Busters =

Dutch anti-piracy company

- Founded: 2010; 16 years ago
- Headquarters: Amsterdam, Netherlands
- Area served: Worldwide
- Products: Anti-piracy
- Website: www.link-busters.com

Link-Busters is a Dutch anti-piracy service headquartered in Amsterdam, Netherlands. It develops software intended to protect publishing companies from piracy by means of sending takedown notices to Google and other search engines on behalf of major publishers.

Link-Busters works for major publishers such as Penguin Random House, HarperCollins, Simon and Schuster, Hachette, John Wiley & Sons, and Princeton University Press. The company was among the top 10 organizations sending takedown notices to Google Search in 2018. In 2024 it was reported that the company was responsible for over half of all Google takedown requests. That year it sent over a billion such requests to Google, and it broke two billion in early 2025, before flagging an additional three billion that same year. Its increased activity has been described as a response to the growing popularity of shadow libraries such as Anna's Archive and Z-Library.

The company relies on automation to generate a high number of requests, some of which have been reported as incorrect. In 2022 the company was criticized for sending takedown notices regarding a book review website that was not infringing on copyright, and engaging in censorship by copyright.
