= Library.nu =

Popular linking website

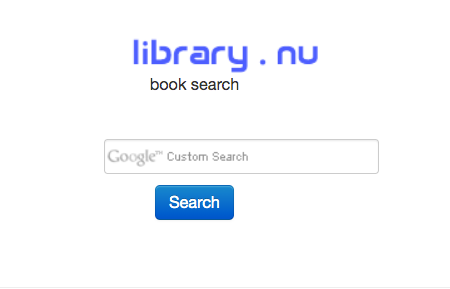
- Website type: Digital library, File sharing, Shadow library
- Launched: 2004
- Current status: Defunct as of 2012

Library.nu, previously called ebooksclub.org from 2004 to 2007 and Gigapedia from 2007 to 2010, was a popular linking website. It was accused of copyright infringement and shut down by court order on February 15, 2012. According to the takedown notice, it hosted some 400,000 ebooks.

== Operators ==
According to an article posted in the British The Sunday Times, investigators believed that library.nu was operated by Irish nationals, possibly from Galway, through a server in Kyiv.

== Injunction ==
This website was targeted by coordinated legal action from 17 publishers who obtained an injunction from a Munich court. The majority of the claimed infringing files were hosted on the iFile.it file hosting service, whose representatives however disclaimed a close relationship with Library.nu. In contrast, a representative of a private intellectual property agency hired by the book publishers stated that the "owners and directors of iFile.it" were the persons whose names appeared on the receipts of PayPal donations to Library.nu. According to TorrentFreak, "the legal team of the publishers estimated the revenue based on page impressions as well as estimated income from premium accounts, but this figure is laughable according to the iFile.it owner, which makes sense considering the site’s modest size." The iFile.it owner also told TorrentFreak that "they can barely cover the server costs with the revenue they make."

== Aftermath ==
The URL "library.nu" was revoked by the .nu domain on 20 February 2012. Between the day of indictment and 24 February, library.nu redirected to Google Books.

== See also ==
- Anna's Archive
- Business aspects of academic publishing
  - Open access
  - Serials crisis
  - Textbook market
- Megaupload
- Library Genesis
