= OceanofPDF =

Website offering illegal book downloads

- Website type: Digital library, file sharing, shadow library
- Available in: English
- Headquarters: United States
- Founder: Nicholas Liam
- Website: oceanofpdf.com
- Commercial: No
- Launched: 2018

OceanofPDF (also written as Oceanofpdf) is a website offering free ebook downloads. It has stated that it aims to make information "free and accessible to everyone around the globe", citing a lack of accessibility in developing countries in particular. It claims to be based in the United States and operate in accordance with California law. However, it has faced legal action from both authors and publishers.

== History ==
OceanofPDF was launched in early 2018 under a US domain name. In July 2018, the site attracted complaints from several high-profile authors, including Philip Pullman, CJ Skuse, Robin Stevens and Maz Evans, after Michelle Harrison found her own books on it and drew attention to it. Speaking on behalf of the site, which he said was run by a "small team of four guys", Nicholas Liam said that they would try to remain active as long as possible.

In August 2018, the site was reportedly taken offline following the author campaign and takedown notices from major publishers including Penguin Random House and HarperCollins. Later the same month, it returned under a .net domain name.

Many authors opposed to OceanofPDF were criticized as classist and elitist by its users. Author Malorie Blackman responded by criticizing the perceived entitlement of ebook pirates, saying that authors deserved to be paid for their labor. Journalist Porter Anderson said this reflected a "culture of victimization" among pirates.

In July 2025, a Belgian commercial court blocked access to sites that provide pirated books, including OceanofPDF, after several professional federations filed a motion.
