= ICanHazPDF =

Hashtag used on Twitter

#ICanHazPDF is a hashtag used on Twitter to request access to academic journal articles which are behind paywalls or otherwise inaccessible. It began in 2011 by scientist Andrea Kuszewski. The name is derived from the meme I Can Has Cheezburger?

== Process ==
Users request articles by tweeting an article's title, DOI or other linked information like a publisher's link, their email address, and the hashtag "#ICanHazPDF". Someone who has access to the article might then email it to them. The user then deletes the original tweet. Alternatively, users who do not wish to post their email address in the clear can use direct messaging to exchange contact information with a volunteer who has offered to share the article of interest.

== Use and popularity ==
The practice amounts to copyright infringement in numerous countries, and so is arguably part of the 'black open access' trend. The majority of requests are for articles published in the last five years, and most users are from English-speaking countries. Requests for biology papers are more common than papers in other fields, despite subscription prices for chemistry, physics, and astronomy being, on average, higher than for biology. Possible reasons for people to use the hashtag include the reluctance of readers to pay for article access and the speed of the process compared to most university interlibrary loans.

== See also ==
- Academic journal publishing reform
- Anna's Archive
- Open Access Button
- Library Genesis
- Sci-Hub
- Shadow library
- Z-Library
