= Cyber espionage on universities =

Cyber spying on universities is the practice of obtaining intelligence, intellectual property, and trade secrets without the permission and knowledge of the university through its information technology system. Universities in the United Kingdom, including Oxford and Cambridge, have been targets, as have institutions in the United States and Australia.

Universities are targets for cyber espionage due to the wealth of personally identifiable information they possess on students, employees, people who buy tickets to sporting events, and, if the university has an academic medical center, on patients treated there. Information about research projects with industrial or military application are also targets. The culture of information sharing within universities tends to make them easy targets.

Breaches can occur from people sharing credentials, phishing, web-crawlers inadvertently finding exposed access points, password cracking, and other standard hacking methods. University credentials are bought and sold on web forums, darknet markets and other black markets.

The result of such efforts have included theft of military research into missile design or stealth technologies, as well as medical data.

As a precaution against such attacks, Stanford University advises its employees to take IT precautions when they travel abroad.

Moreover, in March 2018, the United States charged and sanctioned nine Iranians and the Iranian company Mabna Institute for hacking and attempting to hack hundreds of universities on behalf of the Iranian government.

Credentials used by Sci-Hub to access paywalled scientific articles have been subsequently used by hackers seeking to breach university firewalls to access other information.

In 2025, The Stanford Review reported instances of students at Stanford University conducting research on China who were approached online by likely agents of the Ministry of State Security (MSS) looking to gather intelligence and identify sympathetic students.

== See also ==
- List of data breaches
