= BREIN =

Dutch entertainment industry interest group

Stichting BREIN (Bescherming Rechten Entertainment Industrie Nederland)
- Formation: 1998
- Type: Advocacy group of the entertainment industry aimed at stopping copyright infringement, organised as a stichting
- Headquarters: Hoofddorp
- Location: The Netherlands
- Director: Bastiaan van Ramshorst
- Key people: Tim Kuik (retired)
- Website: stichtingbrein.nl/english/

The Bescherming Rechten Entertainment Industrie Nederland (Dutch for '(Foundation for the) Protection of the Rights of the Entertainment Industry of the Netherlands'; abbreviated as BREIN, 'Brain') is an advocacy group with international links, based in the Netherlands, which represents the interests of the Dutch entertainment industry and is organised under the Dutch law through the legal form of stichting. It is notable for launching court proceedings against copyright infringement in the country and for engaging in lobbying in order to create legal precedents of global significance.

== Participants ==
BREIN brings together organizations or rights holders in the entertainment industry, such as film and recording studios. Those are amongst others:

- Buma/Stemra
- Nederlandse Vereniging van Producenten en Importeurs van Beeld- en Geluidsdragers
- Motion Pictures Association
- Nederlandse Vereniging van Filmdistributeurs
- Bridge Entertainment Group B.V.
- Nederlandse Vereniging van Bioscoopexploitanten
- Stichting Videma
- Nederlandse Vereniging van Entertainment Retailers
- Nederlandse Uitgeversverbond
- members of the International Federation of the Phonographic Industry

== History ==
Former Logo

Tim (Timotheus Jacobus) Kuik, a law graduate of the University of Amsterdam (1982), oversaw the activities of BREIN from its inception. He assumed leadership of BREIN in 1999 after returning to his native Netherlands from Los Angeles, where he had headed the Motion Picture Association's global anti-piracy programme from 1996. He had originally worked for CIC Video, a joint venture between Paramount Pictures and Universal Pictures which represented a change in policy from attempts to ban VHS, and led MPA's anti-piracy activities in Europe from 1992, which included interventions in Hungary and Bulgaria. Before leaving Los Angeles, on 21 February 1998 he presented a paper titled How the East Was Won: Legal Aspects of the Entertainment Business in Russia at a conference there. By the time of its publication in summer 1999 under the changed title Piracy in Russia: An Epidemic, Kuik was listed as the General Director of BREIN.

On 30 July 2009, an Amsterdam civil law court ruled in favour of BREIN in its lawsuit over copyright infringement against the three alleged operators of The Pirate Bay (TPB), who were not officially summoned by the court.

In August 2009, Kuik addressed the Hacking at Random conference on the future of copyright laws and was confronted by TPB's founder Gottfrid Svartholm over his allegations that TPB is run for profit. Kuik was unable to substantiate his claims.

In October 2012, BREIN won a landmark case in The Hague against the Dutch hosting service provider XS Networks, which had refused to shut down a torrent-based file sharing site at BREIN's request and hand over the personal details of its owner to BREIN. The court found XS Network liable for damages for copyright infringement and ordered it to disclose information about the site owner. The ruling was seen as a precedent in that it held hosting providers legally responsible for not complying with requests of industry interest groups in advance of a court order.

In October 2020, BREIN won its ten-year-long lawsuit against three internet service providers (ISPs) – Ziggo, KPN and XS4ALL – when a Lelystad court ordered the ISPs to block The Pirate Bay. In March 2021, the BREIN employee Bastiaan van Ramshorst sent a copy of the blocking order against TPB to Google, although the company had not been named in it.

In November 2021, BREIN and the Dutch Copyright Federation concluded an official covenant-type agreement with six ISPs (Ziggo, KPN, Delta Fiber, T-Mobile, Canal+ and NLConnect), negotiated with the support of the Dutch Ministry of Justice and Security, in which all the participating operators agreed to block a website if one of them received a blocking order against it. BREIN was charged with updating the domain lists of blocked websites, while the ISPs agreed to bear technical costs of enforcing the blocks.

By November 2021 Google voluntarily complied with enforcing the block against TPB, an action that was reported to be unprecedented on its part. BREIN claimed that Google found itself in "the same situation" as the Dutch ISPs who had signed the recent covenant. BREIN subsequently reported further collaboration with Google entailing removing blocked domains from local search results.

In March 2024, BREIN obtained a court order from the Rotterdam District Court for a Dutch ISP to block the Library Genesis and Anna's Archive shadow libraries, thus expanding the existing blocklist under the 2021 covenant. The court issued a dynamic blocking order covering all future domains.

In April 2024, Kuik retired and was replaced by Bastiaan van Ramshorst, a business law graduate (2000) and a member of the International Association for the Protection of Intellectual Property, who joined BREIN around 2010 and whom Kuik had prepared as his successor over the previous ten years. In an interview given on the occasion of his retirement, Kuik admitted that the business model behind Netflix, Spotify and Napster largely derives from the copyright-infringing streaming services BREIN has sought to close down.

== Shutdowns of alleged piracy sites ==
BREIN is known for shutting down Dutch eDonkey 2000 link giant ShareConnector in December 2004. Due to controversy over the legality of links to illegal content, and a lack of quality in the evidence provided by BREIN, the case was not put to trial for several years. After being offline for two years, ShareConnector reopened in December 2006 but on November 12, 2007, Shareconnector went offline again.

On March 16, 2010 the Amsterdam Court of Appeal ruled that sites that offer hash links (like .torrent links) were facilitating copyright infringement, an unlawful behavior. Shareconnector did not make the content available to the public because they did not have control over the content itself and they did not interfere in the up- and downloading process. However, the Court of Appeal ruled that the site was illegal because their procedure made it easier for users to retrieve the illegal content from the eDonkey network.

On October 23, 2007 BREIN, together with IFPI, BPI, Dutch police, and other organizations shut down prominent Bittorrent tracker Oink's Pink Palace.

In a civil court case which BREIN filed in the Netherlands against the founders of The Pirate Bay, on 22 October 2009 the Amsterdam District Court ruled that The Pirate Bay was not making a direct infringement but its facilitating activities amount to an unlawful act. The Court ordered The Pirate Bay to remove a list of torrents that link to copyright-protected works in the Netherlands and to make these torrents on its websites inaccessible for Internet users in the Netherlands. The Pirate Bay ignored the verdict.

In January 2012, BREIN announced that a Dutch court had ordered Ziggo and XS4ALL to block all access to The Pirate Bay. On May 10, 2012 this judgement was followed by a court order of the District Court in The Hague against UPC, KPN, T-Mobile and Tele2 to also block The Pirate Bay for their customers.

Ziggo and XS4ALL appealed this verdict and won, with BREIN being ordered to pay 326,000 Euro as a compensation for process costs.

On March 23, 2024, the Dutch pirate site blocklist has been reported to now include Anna's Archive and Library Genesis, based on a request by BREIN.

== Lawsuit by FTD ==
After a series of allegations that Usenet community Fill Threads Database (FTD) was acting illegally, the Dutch FTD started a lawsuit against BREIN in May 2009. BREIN president Tim Kuik alleged in a Dutch newspaper that "Although they [FTD] are not carrying illegal content on their servers, what FTD does is simply criminal". FTD is suing for a retraction of this libelous statement and demands a declaration from the courts that its activities are entirely within the law.

On February 9, 2011, the Dutch District Court of Haarlem ruled, that FTD had acted unlawfully and issued an injunction. FTD was obliged to ban all references to files of BREIN members.

The court also ruled that Tim Kuik was free to expose the conduct of FTD and communicate the opinion of BREIN. The request for rectification was therefore rejected by the court.

FTD ceased all its operations a few weeks after the verdict.

== Alleged attack on BREIN website ==
On 1 June 2009, Tim Kuik published an online article claiming BREIN's website was "broken" by hackers performing DDoS attacks. He speculated about a possible connection with the intended court summons against The Pirate Bay. Several independent sources reported the site's deep links were still available (only the frontpage was inaccessible) and as such BREIN's claim of having been attacked was false. Brein responded claiming the attacks had stopped and that the site's year old backup had been used to recover the site. Because the backup was dated, the website was now under construction.

Internet blog Geenstijl purportedly discovered BREIN's server was still fully operational and there had been no attack whatsoever - the complete news archive was still available. (A password was later added to BREIN's news archive to prevent further checks on availability.)

On 23 June 2009, The Pirate Bay announced a lawsuit against Tim Kuik on libel charges, claiming The Pirate Bay had nothing to do with the alleged DDoS attack.

== Criticism ==
In September 2009, BREIN CEO Tim Kuik attracted controversy when in a news conference he stated he was using a laptop confiscated from a "pirate" and given to him by someone involved with the case.

BREIN attracted controversy again when several suspicious aspects of their lawsuit against The Pirate Bay and Reservella were revealed, including evidence that documents used to link Fredrik Neij of The Pirate Bay to Reservella were faked. Peter Sunde and the Dutch Pirate Party filed criminal felony charges against both Tim Kuik and BREIN for fraud and forgery.

In January 2011, BREIN targeted one of the Internet's largest warez piracy topsites. The site, known as Swan, was taken down by hosting provider WorldStream and without judicial process BREIN seized its servers. The owners of the servers retaliated by seizing them back and may sue BREIN for breach of privacy and property rights as BREIN is a private organization and has no special legal or investigative authority.

== Bibliography ==
- Lodder, Arno R. (2015), "The Pirate Bay rechtspraak: long and winding road to nowhere?" (PDF), Tijdschrift voor Internetrecht (5–6): 182–189
- Lodder, Arno R.; Polter, Puck (2017), "ISP blocking and filtering: on the shallow justification in case law regarding effectiveness of measures", European Journal of Law and Technology, 8 (2), archived from the original on 2019-08-03
