= ShareConnector =

Index site for files on the eDonkey network

ShareConnector was a popular index site for files on the eDonkey network. ShareConnector does not host any files; instead, the links it contains are accessible through an eDonkey (ed2k) network. It was taken down by an anti-piracy foundation on December 14, 2004 due to the suspicion of breach of copyright and trademark laws. The site came back online, on December 19, 2006. The mainpage was used from a backup taken on November 23, 2004 shortly before it was shut down. The forum userbase was restored from a backup taken on November 20 2004, however the posts database was started from scratch due a recent backup not being available.

== First Closure ==
ShareConnector was closed down for the first time by a Dutch anti-piracy foundation named BREIN. Four months before ShareConnector received closure, a letter was sent from BREIN to remove all eDonkey links or the website administrators would be at risk of getting sued. ShareConnector did not follow BREIN's request because it considered eDonkey links (in contrast to direct links) not illegal. On December 14 2004, FIOD-ECD (a Dutch governmental agency) took down ShareConnector based on the concerns BREIN had.

== The Return ==
On December 5 2006, ShareConnector's administrator informed Slyck.com that ShareConnector was planning to return on December 14 2006 (exactly 2 years after it was forced offline). ShareConnector did in fact return, however not on the 14th instead the 19th. There was problems setting an e-mail domain while the site's domain was in transfer.

== Trial ==
ShareConnector's first court case took place in June 2006, and the ruling was that the anti-piracy foundation BREIN did not have enough evidence to convict the administrator or the ISP on any sort of charges. The judge ruled that BREIN had six months to one year to come up with some evidence against the accused defendant, Adi (ShareConnector's administrator), and the ISP, The Mindlab Hosting. The year passed and the trial was to take place on July 9 and 10, 2007. The outcome should have been known two weeks after the court case, which was sometime around the end of July.

== Second Closure ==
On November 12, 2007, ShareConnector closed again. Apparently, BREIN visited the owner at home to convince him to shut down ShareConnector or else they would start a civil proceeding with a claim.
An update on 26 November (2007) new updates read that the civil case had been continued with, despite the closure. If the author had signed BREIN's agreement, stating the website is illegal, the case would have been dropped. The case on 10 January continued, resulting in a new update being posted on the website. Users are advised to regularly check back to view any new updates.

== Sources ==
- ShareConnector
- Slyck: ShareConnector Trial Finally Resumes
- Slyck: Shut Down Story
- Slyck: The Return Story
- Slyck: ShareConnector Trial Begins
- Slyck: ShareConnector Trial Delayed
- TorrentFreak: Court Shuts ShareConnector Down For Good
