= Library Genesis =

File-sharing website for publications

The Library Genesis Project

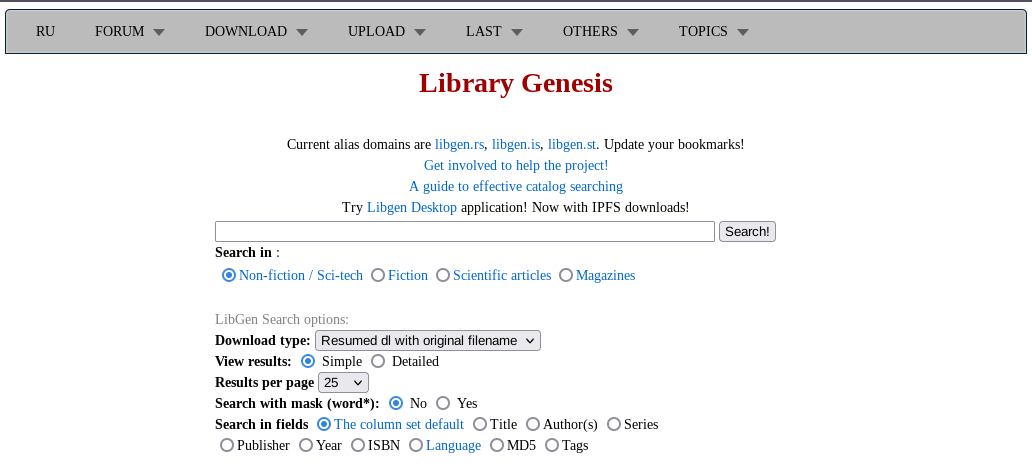
- The project's homepage
- Website type: Shadow library
- Available in: English; Russian
- Website: libgen.pw; libgen.bz; randombook.org; Latest links also available at: https://open-slum.org
- Commercial: No
- Registration: Optional (Note: LibGen can be viewed, downloaded, uploaded without an account, but registration is required to view or read topics within its forum.)
- Current status: Active

Library Genesis (shortened to LibGen) is a shadow library project for file-sharing access to scholarly journal articles, academic and general-interest books, images, comics, audiobooks, and magazines. The site enables free access to works that are otherwise paywalled or not digitized elsewhere. LibGen describes itself as a "links aggregator", providing a searchable database of items "collected from publicly available public Internet resources" as well as files uploaded "from users".

LibGen provides prohibited access to works, such as PDFs of journals from Elsevier's ScienceDirect web-portal. Publishers like Elsevier have accused Library Genesis of internet piracy. Others assert that academic publishers unfairly benefit from government-funded research, written by researchers, many of whom are employed by public universities, and that LibGen is helping to disseminate research that should be freely available in the first place.

== Outages ==
Since December 2024, LibGen has been targeted by US based Educational Publishers Pearson Education, alongside being placed on a ban list in Germany at request of multiple unnamed publishers.

This legal action is leading to significant outages across the service.

== History ==
The roots of Library Genesis lie in Russia, where the former Soviet Russia and Soviet Union underground book sharing culture known as samizdat arose to illegally get around the tight censorship. As access to printing in the Soviet Union was strictly controlled and censored, dissident intellectuals would hand-copy and retype illegal manuscripts for secret circulation. This was effectively legalized under Soviet general secretary Mikhail Gorbachev in the 1980s, though the state monopoly on printed media remained.

The volunteers moved into the Russian computer network ("RuNet") in the 1990s, which became awash with hundreds of thousands of uncoordinated contributions. Librarians became especially active, using borrowed access passwords to download copies of scientific and scholarly articles from Western Internet sources, then uploading them to RuNet.

In the early 21st century, the efforts became coordinated, and integrated into one massive system known as Library Genesis, or LibGen, around 2008. It subsequently absorbed the contents of, and became the functional successor to, library.nu, which was shut down by legal action in 2012. By 2014, its catalog was more than twice the size of library.nu with 1.2 million records. As of 4 February 2024, Library Genesis claimed to have more than 2.4 million non-fiction books, 80 million science journal articles, 2 million comics files, 2.2 million fiction books, and 0.4 million magazine issues.

In 2020, the project was forked under a different domain, "libgen.fun", due to internal conflict within the project. As a result, databases were maintained independently and as a consequence, the works available differed between libgen.fun and other LibGen domains. As of 2025, libgen.fun is no longer available, as the domain was seized.

As of August 2024, the project, whose website was experiencing temporary outages and technical errors, appeared to no longer be actively managed and its lead programmer was reported to be "inactive".

In mid-December 2024, as the majority of Library Genesis domains were seized or disabled through legal action from a group of publishers led by Pearson Education, the German consortium Clearingstelle Urheberrecht im Internet (CUII), composed of copyright holder groups and internet service providers, also instituted a country-wide blocking order against Library Genesis at the request of publishers whose names were redacted. The latter action was taken without court authorization; instead, the Federal Network Agency was consulted to clear the net neutrality requirements.

== Legal issues ==
=== Litigation ===
==== Elsevier lawsuit (2015) ====
On June 3, 2015, Library Genesis (along with the creator of Sci-Hub, Alexandra Elbakyan) was sued by Elsevier, the academic division of the third-largest publishing group by worldwide revenue in 2014. Elsevier accused it of "operating an international network of piracy and copyright infringement" and granting free access to articles and books. In response, the admins accused Elsevier of gaining most of its profits from publicly funded research which should be freely available to all as they are paid for by taxpayers. Elsevier's lawyers then requested the Public Interest Registry to disable one of the domains covered by the lawsuit without a court order but were refused. On June 18, 2015, the District Court for the Southern District of New York allowed Elsevier to serve notice on the defendants by email. Within days of the court decision (before June 22), the main "libgen.org" website and several mirrors went offline.

As a result of Elsevier's lawsuit, in late October 2015 the District Court for the Southern District of New York ordered LibGen to shut down and to suspend use of the domain name (libgen.org), but the site remained accessible through alternative domains.

==== Pearson, McGraw Hill, Macmillan and Cengage lawsuit (2023–2024) ====
On September 14, 2023, the educational publishers Pearson Education (the third-largest publisher by global revenue), McGraw Hill Education, Macmillan Publishers and Cengage Group initiated a lawsuit for copyright infringement against Library Genesis before the District Court for the Southern District of New York. They claimed that the Library Genesis websites "deprive [them] and their authors of income from their creative works, devalue the textbook market and [their] works, and may cause [them] to cease publishing certain works". They demanded control or deletion of the Library Genesis domains and the seizure of its operators' alleged profits. On March 1, 2024, the publishers requested a default judgment and an injunction compelling the gateway providers IPFS, Pinata Technologies and Cloudflare to deny services to Library Genesis.

On September 26, 2024, a US judge ordered LibGen to pay the publishers US$30 million, though the parties responsible for the site are unknown.

In December 2024, the publishers succeeded in seizing the "library.lol" domain and taking most of the other Library Genesis domains offline.

=== Hosting country ===
LibGen is reported to be registered in both Russia and the Netherlands, making the appropriate jurisdiction for legal action unclear.

=== Blocks ===
Some LibGen URLs are blocked by a number of ISPs in the United Kingdom, but such DNS-based blocks are claimed to do little to deter access. It is also blocked by ISPs in France, Germany, Greece, Italy, Belgium (which redirects to the Belgian Federal Police blockpage), and Russia (in November 2018). On March 23, 2024, the Dutch pirate site blocklist has been reported to now include Anna's Archive and Library Genesis, based on a request by BREIN, a local anti-piracy group.

=== AI training ===
==== Claude ====
Court documents unsealed in June 2025 suggested that Anthropic reportedly used LibGen resources to train its generative language AI models. The documents were part of a separate class action-lawsuit filed against Anthropic by writers Andrea Bartz, Charles Graeber and Kirk Wallace Johnson.

In a June 2025 order in the case, Judge William Alsup stated that Anthropic had downloaded at least five million copies of books from LibGen in June 2021, part of more than seven million pirated copies of books it obtained from three sources. In September 2025, Anthropic agreed to pay $1.5 billion to settle the lawsuit, and the court granted final approval of the settlement and entered judgment on July 20, 2026.

==== Meta AI ====
Court documents unsealed in March 2025 suggested that Meta Platforms had used LibGen resources to train its generative language AI models. The documents were part of a class-action lawsuit filed against Meta by the novelists Richard Kadrey and Christopher Golden and comedian Sarah Silverman.

== Usage ==
Until the end of 2014, Sci-Hub, which provides free access to millions of research papers and books, relied on LibGen as storage. Papers requested by users were requested from LibGen and served from there if available, otherwise they were fetched by other means and then stored on LibGen.

In 2019 archivists and freedom of information activists launched a project to better seed and host LibGen's data dumps. The project's spokesperson and coordinator 'shrine' described the effort as a way for a "permanent library card for the world" and reported that the response has been "overwhelmingly positive from everyone". In 2020, the project launched a peer-to-peer digital library of works from Sci-Hub and Library Genesis using IPFS.

== See also ==
- Guerilla Open Access Manifesto – Manifesto for radical Open Access
- ICanHazPDF – Hashtag used on Twitter
