= Moral imperative =

Philosophical concept introduced by Immanuel Kant

A moral imperative is a strongly-felt principle that compels a person "in question" to act. It is a kind of categorical imperative as defined by Immanuel Kant. Kant took the imperative to be a dictate of pure reason, in its practical aspect. Not following the moral law was seen to be self-defeating and thus contrary to reason. Later thinkers took the imperative to originate in conscience, as the divine voice speaking through the human spirit. The dictates of conscience are simply right and often resist further justification. Looked at another way, the experience of conscience is the basic experience of encountering the right.

An example of following a moral imperative is breaking into someone's house in order to save a baby in a burning crib. An example of not following a moral imperative is making a promise that you do not intend to keep in order to get something.

== See also ==
- Moral obligation
- Deontological ethics
- Teleology
- Ethical dilemma
