= Taren Stinebrickner-Kauffman =

Australian-American activist

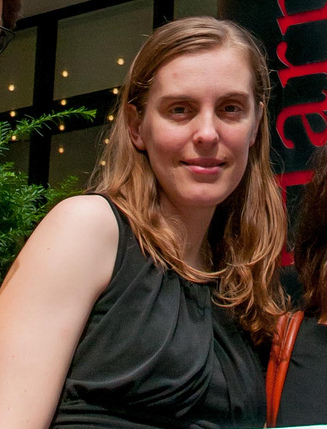
- Stinebrickner-Kauffman in New York City, 2012
- Born: Taren Kate Stinebrickner-Kauffman; Brisbane, Queensland, Australia
- Citizenship: Australia; United States
- Education: Duke University
- Occupation: Activist
- Children: 2

Taren Kate Stinebrickner-Kauffman is an Australian-American activist. She is the founder of SumOfUs, and served as the executive director until 2016. Stinebrickner-Kauffman is the co-founder and CEO of the Golden Gate Institute for AI.

== Early life and education ==
Taren Kate Stinebrickner-Kauffman was born in Brisbane, Queensland, Australia. She was raised in Greencastle, Indiana.

She graduated summa cum laude and Phi Beta Kappa with a degree in mathematics from Duke University in 2004.

== Career ==
Stinebrickner-Kauffman has worked in social-impact technology, Democratic politics, consumer advocacy, corporate accountability, environmental advocacy, and the U.S. labor movement, including time with groups such as Avaaz.org, the Alliance for Climate Protection, MoveOn.org, and the AFL-CIO.

She founded SumOfUs in 2011, serving as executive director and growing the organisation to 5 million members worldwide. In March 2012, she and SumOfUs were active critics of working conditions at Apple Inc. supplier Foxconn.

She went on to serve as senior product manager at Change.org, before becoming entrepreneur-in-residence at New Media Ventures, a non-profit venture capital firm focused on progressive organisations. She was appointed president of New Media Ventures in March 2020, leading the organisation during the early phase of the COVID-19 pandemic and prioritising work on voting rights and local media. She stepped down in 2022.

Stinebrickner-Kauffman founded AI Impact Lab to help mission driven organizations leverage the generative AI. She co-founded and is as of September 2026 CEO of the Golden Gate Institute for AI.

== Board memberships ==
As of 2022 Stinebrickner-Kauffman served on the board of Consumer Reports.

== Personal life ==
Stinebrickner-Kauffman was the partner of Aaron Swartz from 2011 until his death. In 2011, Swartz was prosecuted by U.S. Attorney for Massachusetts Carmen Ortiz for violations of the Computer Fraud and Abuse Act (CFAA), and, facing the risk of up to 35 years imprisonment and $1 million in fines if he exercised his Sixth Amendment right to a public trial and was convicted, he died by suicide in 2013. She discovered his body.

She has two children via sperm donors.
