= Stephen Heymann =

American lawyer

Assistant United States Attorney for the District of Massachusetts

Personal details
- Occupation: Attorney

Stephen P. Heymann is an attorney who formerly served as an Assistant U.S. Attorney for the District of Massachusetts. He is no longer with the U.S. Attorney's office. He headed U.S. Attorney Carmen Ortiz's Internet and Computer Crimes Unit.

Heymann was a prosecutor in the United States v. Swartz federal criminal case, during which Aaron Swartz allegedly died by suicide. Heymann was also the lead prosecutor in the investigation of TJX hack which preceded the suicide of hacker Jonathan James.

== Personal ==
Heymann is the son of former United States Deputy Attorney General Philip Heymann, with whom Ortiz worked on judicial reform in Guatemala.

== Career ==
Heymann was a career federal prosecutor.

He was formerly a Special Attorney with the U.S. Department of Justice's Organized Crime Strike Force, Deputy Chief of the Criminal Division of the Massachusetts U.S. Attorney's Office. He headed that office's Internet and Computer Crimes Unit, one of the first offices of its kind in the U.S. According to the National Law Journal, "Heymann has long been recognized as a national expert in electronic crimes, prosecuting cutting-edge cases."

=== NASA computer hack ===
In 1995-1996, Heymann supported lead prosecutor Jacqueline E. Ross and worked with investigators in the lead-up to the arrest, prosecution and conviction of Julio César "Griton" Ardita, an Argentine man accused of hacking into NASA and Department of Defense computers. The court-ordered wiretap that made it possible to identify and prosecute Ardita was the first of its kind.

From his apartment in Buenos Aires, Ardita accessed a computer network at Harvard. He stole passwords as Harvard users accessed other networks. By the time he was caught, Ardita had hacked into the U.S. Department of Defense, NASA's Jet Propulsion Laboratory, NASA Ames Research Center, the Naval Research Laboratory, and the Naval Command Control and Ocean Surveillance Center.

Heymann said investigators worked with Harvard so they could track an intruder without violating users' privacy. He said the compromised Harvard network comprised 16,500 accounts and 13,000 users, sending out about 60,000 email messages daily. Investigators, he explained used a high-speed computer to sift through messages, focusing on 10 to 15 keywords that matched the suspect's profile. According to Heymann, investigators believed there were only two instances in which they had read a complete message that did not come from Ardita.

In a press release after the warrant for Ardita's arrest was announced, Attorney General Janet Reno said, "This case demonstrates that the real threat to computer privacy comes from unscrupulous intruders, not government investigators", going on to praise the creation of procedures that focused on the intruder's unlawful activities. "This is doing it the right way," she said. "We are using a traditional court order and new technology to defeat a criminal, while protecting individual rights and Constitutional principles that are important to all Americans." At her weekly press conference, she elaborated: "This is an example of how the Fourth Amendment and a court order can be used to protect rights while adapting to modern technology."

The case was complicated by the fact that Ardita resided in Argentina, where the charged felonies were not extraditable offenses. Two years after the warrant issued, Ardita voluntarily traveled to the U.S., pleaded guilty, and was sentenced to three years probation and a fine of $5,000.

=== TJX identity theft ===
Heymann led the investigation of computer hacker Albert Gonzalez-associates Jonathan James, Stephen Watt and Damon Toey for computer intrusion and identity theft from the TJX Companies and from retailers like BJ's, DSW, OfficeMax, Boston Market, Barnes & Noble, Sports Authority and Forever 21.

Watt and Toey were convicted. James, an alleged "unindicted co-conspirator," was never prosecuted in the case, having committed suicide two weeks after the U.S. Secret Service raided his house. Gonzalez was never charged in the TJX case.

=== Heartland Payment Systems ===
Heymann was instrumental in successfully prosecuting Gonzalez for the theft of data from 130 million transactions at Heartland Payment Systems. He was honored with the Attorney General's Distinguished Service Award by Attorney General Eric Holder for his work on "the largest and most successful identity theft and hacking investigation and prosecution ever conducted in the United States."

=== Aaron Swartz ===
Heymann's conduct in the prosecution of Internet activist Aaron Swartz is widely considered to be inconsistent with professional ethics. Two White House web site petitions to fire him for his handling of the case garnered a combined total of more than 90,000 signatures in less than a month. The White House responded by saying "We do not believe this is the appropriate forum in which to do so". One attorney for Swartz accused Heymann of using the case to gain publicity for himself. Two others submitted a complaint to the Department of Justice Office of Professional Responsibility, accusing Heymann of prosecutorial misconduct and alleging the prosecution withheld exculpatory evidence and undermined Swartz's right to a fair trial.

Swartz killed himself on January 11, 2013, before his trial. According to attorney Andy Good, Swartz's initial attorney, "I told Heymann the kid was a suicide risk. His reaction was a standard reaction in that office, not unique to Steve. He said, 'Fine, we’ll lock him up.' I’m not saying they made Aaron kill himself. Aaron might have done this anyway. I’m saying they were aware of the risk, and they were heedless."

Ortiz has defended the prosecution: "We thought the case was reasonably handled and we would not have done things differently. We're going to continue doing the work of the office and of following our mission." Testifying before the House Oversight Committee, Attorney General Eric Holder called the case "a good use of prosecutorial discretion."
