= Philip Heymann =

27th United States Deputy Attorney General

Philip B. Heymann
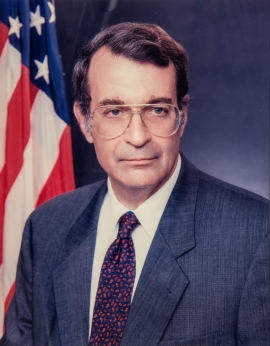

27th United States Deputy Attorney General
- In office May 28, 1993 – March 17, 1994
- President: Bill Clinton
- Preceded by: George J. Terwilliger III
- Succeeded by: Jamie Gorelick

United States Assistant Attorney General for the Criminal Division
- In office 1978–1981
- President: Jimmy Carter
- Preceded by: Benjamin R. Civiletti
- Succeeded by: D. Lowell Jensen

Personal details
- Born: Philip Benjamin Heymann; October 30, 1932 Pittsburgh, Pennsylvania, U.S.
- Died: November 30, 2021 (aged 89) Los Angeles, California, U.S.
- Party: Democratic
- Spouse: Ann Ross (m. 1954)
- Children: Stephen, Jody
- Education: Yale University (BA); Harvard University (JD)
- Occupation: Attorney; academic

Philip Benjamin Heymann (October 30, 1932 – November 30, 2021) was an American legal scholar and federal prosecutor who headed the Criminal Division of the Justice Department as Assistant Attorney General during the Carter administration and was briefly Deputy Attorney General in the Clinton administration before he resigned over management and policy differences as well as perceived interference by the White House. He was involved internationally in supporting the rule of law in criminal justice systems. In domestic politics he was a vocal supporter of civil and political liberties and, as such, was actively critical of the George W. Bush administration, particularly its warrantless domestic spying program. Even before the September 11 attacks, Heymann studied and published on how prosecution of antiterror policies can be done consistent with the rule of law in a democratic society. He was later James Bar Ames Professor of Law, emeritus at Harvard Law School, where he began teaching in 1969.

== Early life and education ==
Heymann was born in the Squirrel Hill section of Pittsburgh on October 30, 1932, as one of two children of Sidney B. and Bessie (Kann) Heymann. His father owned an insurance agency. He was a 1950 graduate of Pittsburgh's Shady Side Academy. Heymann's sister, Sidney (known as Sally) became a licensed psychologist in Washington, Pennsylvania. She died in 1991.

In 1954 he received his B.A. degree summa cum laude from Yale University, where he was a member of Scroll and Key Society. He was awarded a Fulbright grant, and he studied at the Sorbonne in Paris for the 1954–1955 academic year. He then served two years in the Air Force's Office of Special Investigations, reviewing security clearances. He later received his J.D. degree from Harvard Law School, where he was third in his class and one of two case editors of the Harvard Law Review. Thereafter, he clerked for Justice John M. Harlan during the 1960–1961 term.

== Career ==
=== Early government career ===
==== Solicitor General's Office ====
From 1961 to 1965 Heymann practiced in the office of the Solicitor General of the United States under Archibald Cox. After his admission to the Supreme Court bar in 1963, Heymann argued six cases before the Supreme Court. (Note: Brooks v. Missouri Pacific Rail Co., argued on January 7–8, 1965, opinion at 376 U.S. 182 (1964); Bruning v. United States, argued March 3, 1964, opinion at 376 U.S. 358 (1964); Fallen v. United States, argued April 3, 1965, opinion at 378 U.S. 139 (1964); Federal Trade Commission v. Colgate Palmolive Co., argued on December 14, 1964, opinion at 380 U.S. 374 (1965); Paragon Jewel Coal Co. v. Commissioner of Internal Revenue and Commissioner of Internal Revue v. Merritt, consolidated and argued March 8, 1965, opinion at 380 U.S. 624 (1965) and Jenkins v. United States, argued April 1, 1965, opinion at 380 U.S. 445 (1965).) Only one of these, however, received any publicity, and that was owing to the unusual levity of the court on that occasion. (Note: The case FTC v. Colgate-Palmolive Co., involved an order by the Federal Trade Commission that a shaving cream manufacturer cease broadcasting misleading demonstrations claiming that its product enabled sand to be shaved from sandpaper. Justices joked about the prevalence and amateurishness of misleading claims on television commercials. Heymann said of his performance that he was "doing better as a comedian" than a lawyer. The New York Times reported that the court "muses gaily on shaves", and Anthony Lewis used the cases to introduce his musings on how the judges made decisions humanly. The Supreme Court ultimately upheld the order in an opinion at 380 U.S. 374 (1965).) Heymann left the Solicitor General's office shortly after President Johnson accepted Cox's pro forma resignation at the end of the court's term in 1965.

==== State Department ====
In September 1965 he became deputy in the Bureau of Security and Consular Affairs of the State Department and was appointed acting administrator in March 1966. Right before his appointment he issued a reprimand to the head of the Passport Office for asking the U.S. embassies in Paris and Moscow to report on the activities of Harvard history professor and anti-nuclear activist H. Stuart Hughes. The written reprimand cited the significant freedom that Americans ought to enjoy in freedom of movement. After issuing the reprimand, the Bureau learned that the FBI had asked for the instructions and that such surveillance requests had routinely been made without the knowledge of the directors of the Bureau for at least two decades. The affair became something of a political issue, an early pushback against government surveillance. (Note: Senator Edward Kennedy took up the case (even though Professor Hughes had run against him to succeed John F. Kennedy as Senator) by writing a "sternly owrded" letter to Secretary of State Dean Rusk to express his "dismay" on learning that the government was spying on citizens abroad because of their political beliefs. The head of the Passport Office, Frances G. Knight,. it turned out, had a long and controversial history, questing whether the U.S. had the "will" to defend itself from communist subversion and opposed effort to allow citizens to see evidence against them when they were denied passports. But she claimed she was not the one who issued the order to the embassies, because she was out of the office. Secretary Rusk eventually agreed to set rules for requests for surveillance, but Ms. Knight remained unrepentant, holding a press conveference in which she railed against both Heymann and his predecessor. The State Department told the Times that there was no evidence she was out of the office when the order was sent and that it was her responsibility in any event. Knight called Heymann a "34 year old whiz kid", one of eight bosses she had in 10 years, but said she would follow orders "if I can find out what they are".) After serving as acting administrator of the Bureau for nearly a year, Heymann was appointed Deputy Assistant Secretary in the State Department's Bureau of Internal Organizations. In 1967 he became Executive Assistant to Under Secretary of State Nicholas Katzenbach. In 1968 Heymann helped Katzenbach force a reluctant State Department bureaucracy to finally undertake a review of the denial of security clearance of John Paton Davies, one of the China Hands whose security clearance was revoked 14 years before by then Secretary of State John Foster Dulles, who made the decision under pressure of Joseph McCarthy's allegations. The conduct of Davies was vindicated in the later review and his security clearance re-instated.

=== Harvard, Cox and Watergate ===
Heymann left the State Department for Harvard Law School where he taught as visiting professor from July 1969. He was one of the very few faculty hires by the law school who had a substantial amount of non-academic experience between graduation and appointment. Heymann also became a faculty member at Harvard Kennedy School.

Heymann believed that law students were better served by being taught how to build institutions rather than merely instructed in legal ideas. (Note: Much later, in a tribute to James Vorenberg, Heymann wrote: Professors tend to exaggerate the importance of most new ideas. Much that is most important to our lives and to our history happens when, on a larger or smaller stage, individuals create or shape institutions. And much of the most important teaching is not about new discoveries or new critical insights into what has been assumed. It is about building institutions.) At the beginning of his academic career Heymann worked to introduce law students to some of the methods taught in the Kennedy School for creating and managing institutions. In 1979 he proposed and the Law School tentatively approved a proposal for a 13-hour elective in such fields as analytical methods, economic theory, statistical methods and political theory.

At Harvard he was now a colleague of Archibald Cox, his boss in the Solicitor General's office. Their political impulses were roughly the same. Heymann joined Cox and most of the Law School faculty, for instance, in an open letter to Congress, urging an end to the Vietnam war at the height of student unrest following the Kent State shootings. Cox, unlike Heymann, however, refused to involve himself in the politics of the Supreme Court. (Note: Cox did not sign the letter to the Senate urging that William Rehnquist not be confirmed as Supreme Court Justice on the ground that he was "outside the central stream of contemporary constitution thought", which was signed by Heymann and 19 other faculty members.) Heymann collaborated with Cox in drafting the amicus curiae brief to the Massachusetts Supreme Judicial Court on behalf of the American Mutual Assurance Alliance and the American Insurance Association, in support of the constitutionality of Massachusetts's No-fault insurance scheme, a piece of legislation with a decided Harvard connection. (Note: The first comprehensive legislative proposal for a no-fault automobile insurance scheme was proposed by Harvard Law School Professor Robert Keeton with Jeffrey O'Connell in a law review article published in the Harvard Law Review in 1964. The Massachusetts legislation was introduced by state representative Michael Dukakis (Harvard Law, 1960) in 1967. The Massachusetts high court upheld the law, opening the way for other states to adopt the scheme, in a unanimous decision.)

In May 1973 when Cox was confirmed as the Special Counsel to investigate and prosecute crimes connected with the Watergate scandal. Cox chose two fellow faculty members to help him set up the office. One was James Vorenberg, who had been the executive director of President Johnson's Commission on Law Enforcement and Administration of Justice from 1965 to 1967 and had founded and chaired the Center for the Advancement of Criminal Justice at Harvard Law School. He was therefore versed in how to create, staff and run a large legal institution dealing with complex problems. The other was Heymann. Journalist James Doyle who saw the daily workings of the special counsel's office as communications adviser to Cox and Leon Jaworski concluded that because Cox's own son broke the family tradition by not entering the legal profession and because Heymann worked for Cox at the Solicitor General's Office and trained under him at Harvard Law School, Heymann, his Harvard colleague, "was as close to Archibald Cox as a son".

The first task of the three lawyers was to prevent the resignation of the three assistant United States Attorneys who had prosecuted the Watergate burglars, who had threatened to quit in a pique because Cox had not consulted with them before appearing before the Senate Judiciary Committee to explain how he planned to proceed. Cox met with them for two and a half hours, and while he gave them a tepid letter of support. he privately determined that he needed to hire a criminal trial lawyer to replace them. Cox hired James F. Neal, who he knew from his days as Solicitor General, when Neal won a conviction of James Hoffa for jury tampering. It was Neal and Heymann who debriefed the three prosecutors. The next major challenge was to ensure that whoever was indicted would receive a fair trial and prevent premature disclosure of evidence that might compromise the criminal cases. In that regard the Senate Watergate Committee proved a challenge because they were about to televise a hearing with Nixon counsel John Dean. Cox met with the committee's counsel, Sam Dash, who refused to postpone or otherwise modify any of the committee's plans. Cox was afraid that the nationwide publicity might jeopardize the case and that the committee's use of immunity to compel Dean's testimony might altogether bar charges against Dean. Cox decided to obtain a court order either postponing or otherwise modifying the terms of the hearing and preventing the committee from obtaining immunity for Dean. After the staff lawyers researched the issue, they concluded that there was no basis for such a motion. Heymann was also against it for policy reasons. He thought that Cox should not be perceived as "the one [who] kept the country from getting the story". Since Cox had publicly committed to such a motion, however, he decided to have Heymann argue the motion in court to prevent damage to his own relations with the court. In a court room packed with reporters Heymann gingerly made the argument, mainly to show that the Special Counsel was concerned with the due process rights of the defendants and not to prevent the public from hearing the evidence. (Cox had expressly cautioned him not to "overargue" the motion.) At one point Heymann said, "I want to be careful not to overargue my case ..." Judge John Sirica tersely replied: "No chance of that, young man." The court denied the Special Counsel's motion in all respects.

Heymann spent the rest of the summer working as Associate Special Counsel, returning to Cambridge to teach in the fall. When President Richard Nixon fired Cox that October in the so-called Saturday Night Massacre Heymann flew to Washington to lend Cox moral support during Cox's press conference at the National Press Club. He was deeply pessimistic that Nixon would allow the prosecutors to continue. He would nevertheless return for the summers of 1974 and 1975 to work in the office of Cox's successor, Leon Jaworksi.

=== Later career ===
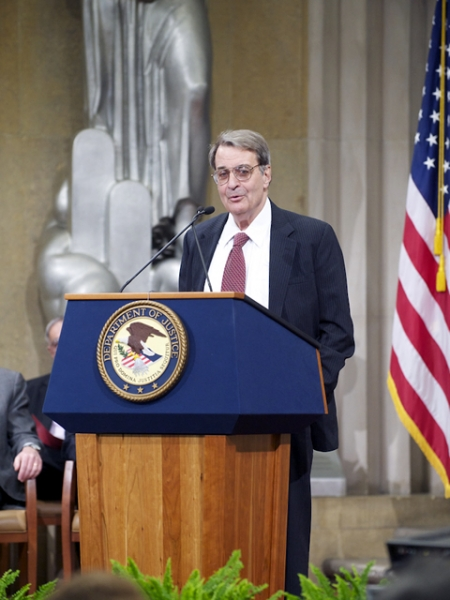
Heymann speaks at a Department of Justice memorial tribute ceremony for Jack Keeney in 2012

Heymann compiled the National Football League report on the sexual harassment of female sportswriter Lisa Olson.

He was Assistant Attorney General (Criminal Division) from 1978 to 1981 and Deputy Attorney General from 1993 to 1994.

Heymann was co-chairman of the Constitution Project's bipartisan Sentencing Committee.

He was elected to the Common Cause National Governing Board in 1978 and 1998.

== Personal life ==
In 1954, Heymann married the former Ann Ross of the Oakland section of Pittsburgh, and they had two children. His son, Stephen Heymann, is a former Assistant United States Attorney. His daughter Jody, with whom he wrote an article in 1996 while she was assistant professor of health care policy at Harvard Medical School and the John F. Kennedy School of Government at Harvard, subsequently became Dean of the Field School of Public Health at the University of California, Los Angeles.

Heymann died from complications of a stroke at his home in Los Angeles on November 30, 2021, at the age of 89.

== Selected publications ==
=== Books ===
- Heymann, Philip B. and William H. Kenety (comp.), The Murder Trial of Wilbur Jackson: A Homicide in the Family (St. Paul, Minn.: West Publishing Co., 1975).
- Heymann, Philip B., The Politics of Public Management (New Haven, Conn.: Yale University Press, c1987).
- Mathews, M.L., Philip B. Heymann and A.S. Mathews (eds.), Policing the Conflict in South Africa (Gainesville, Florida: University Press of Florida, 1993).
- Heymann, Philip B., Terrorism and America: A Commonsense Strategy for a Democratic Society (Cambridge, Massachusetts: MIT Press, 1998).
- Heymann, Philip B. and William N. Brownsberger, Drug Addiction and Drug Policy: The Struggle to Control Dependence (Cambridge, Massachusetts: Harvard University Press, 2001).
- Heymann, Philip B., Terrorism, Freedom, and Security: Winning Without War (Cambridge, Massachusetts: MIT Press, 2003).
- Heymann, Philip B. and Juliette N. Kayyem, Long-Term Legal Strategy Project for Preserving Security and Democratic Freedoms in the War on Terrorism ([Cambridge, Massachusetts:] National Memorial Institute for the Prevention of Terrorism, [2004]).
- Heymann, Philip B. and Juliette N. Kayyem, Protecting Liberty in an Age of Terror (Cambridge, Massachusetts: MIT Press, 2005).
- Heymann, Philip B., Living the Policy Process (Oxford: Oxford University Press, 2008).
- Blum, Gabriella and Philip B. Heymann, Laws, Outlaws, and Terrorists: Lessons from the War on Terrorism (Cambridge, Massachusetts: MIT Press, 2010).

=== Articles ===
- Heymann, Philip B., "Understanding Criminal Investigations", 22 Harvard Journal on Legislation 315-34 (Summer 1985).
- Heymann, Philip B. and Sara Holtz, "The Severely Defective Newborn: The Dilemma and the Decision Process", 23 Public Policy 381-417 (Fall 1975).
- Heymann, Philip B., "A Law Enforcement Model for Legal Services", 23 Clearinghouse Review 254-57 (July 1989).
- Heymann, Philip B., "International Cooperation in Dealing With Terrorism: A Review of Law and Recent Practice", 6 American University Journal of International Law and Policy 1-34 (Fall 1990).
- Heymann, Philip B., "Two Models of National Attitudes toward International Cooperation in Law Enforcement", 31 Harvard International Law Journal 99-107 (Winter 1990).
- Heymann, Philip B., "Considering the Costs and Benefits of Lawyering in Drafting Legislation or Establishing Precedents, 36 Villanova Law Review 191-216 (February 1991).
- Getmann, Philip B., "Should Latin American Prosecutors Be Independent of the Executive in Prosecuting Government Abuses?" 26 University of Miami Inter-American Law Review 535-59 (April 1995).
- Heymann, Philip B and Mark H. Moore, "The Federal Role in Dealing with Violent Street Crime: Principles, Questions, and Cautions", 543 Annals of the American Academy of Political and Social Science 103-15 (January 1996).
- Heymann, Philip and Jody Heymann, "The Fate of Public Debate in the United States", 33 Harvard Journal on Legislation 511-26 (Spring 1996).
- Heymann, Philip B., "Democracy and Corruption", 20 Fordham International Law Journal 323-46 (December 1996).
- Heymann, Philip B., "The New Policing", 28 Fordham Urban Law Journal 407-56 (December 2000).
- Heymann, Philip B., "Cautionary Note on the Expanding Role of the U.S. Attorneys' Office", 28 Capital University Law Review 745-52 (2000).
- Heymann, Philip B., "Civil Liberties and Human Rights in the Aftermath of September 11", 29 Human Rights 17-25 (Winter 2002).
- Heymann, Philip, "The On/Off Switch", 16 William and Mary Bill of Rights Journal 55-62 (October 2007).
- Blum, Gabriella and Philip B. Heymann, "Law and Policy of Targeted Killing", 1 Harvard National Security Journal 145-70 (June 27, 2010).

== See also ==
- List of law clerks for the ninth seat of the Supreme Court of the United States

== Notes ==
Legal offices
Preceded by George J. Terwilliger III	U.S. Deputy Attorney General; Served under: Bill Clinton; 1993–1994	Succeeded by Jamie Gorelick
