= Guerilla Open Access Manifesto =

Manifesto for radical Open Access

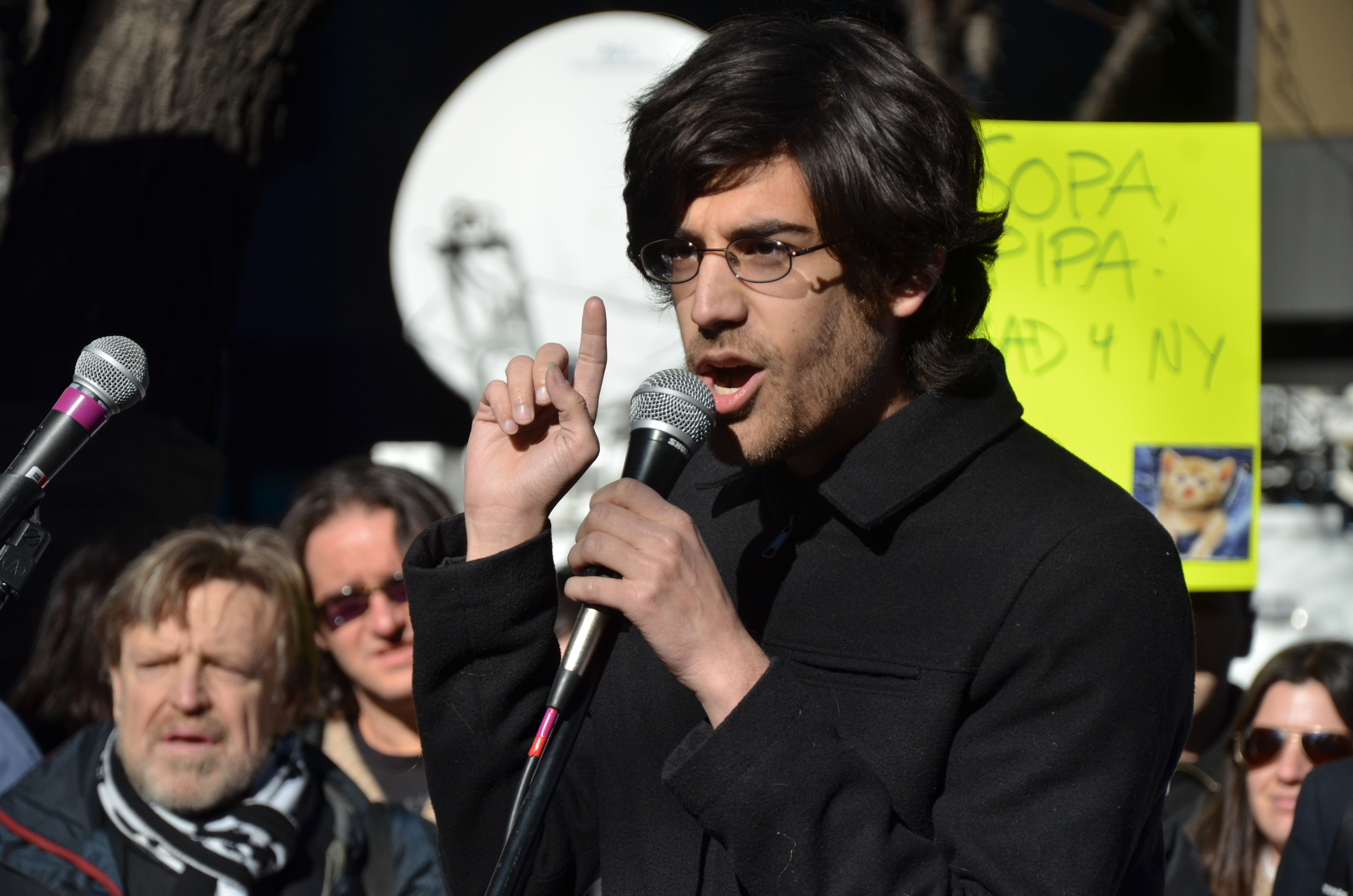
Aaron Swartz, the person who published the Manifesto.

The Guerilla Open Access Manifesto is a document published by (and widely attributed to) Aaron Swartz in 2008 that argues for transgressive approaches to achieving the goals of the open access movement through civil disobedience, willful violation of copyright and contracts that restrict redistribution of knowledge, and activities that exist in legal grey areas.

The goal of the open access movement taken up by the manifesto include the removal of barriers and paywalls that prohibit the general public from accessing scientific research publications and other forms of data. While most of the open access movement has focused on standing up new open access publishers, working with traditional publishers to switch to open access, and organizing scholars who produce and edit articles, these focuses primarily affect the accessibility of future publications. The manifesto is largely concerned with the existing proprietary articles and data that are unlikely to be released as open access by the current copyright holders.

The manifesto appears to have been written in 2008 at a meeting of librarians and was subsequently published on Swartz's personal blog. Although the authorship of the document is widely attributed to Swartz, his role in writing the manifesto and the degree to which the manifesto reflected his views, especially several years later, were a contentious issue in United States v. Swartz, the US government's legal proceedings against him several years later. US government prosecutors sought to use the manifesto to argue that Swartz engaged in the mass downloading of articles from JSTOR for the purpose of releasing those articles freely to the public in ways that mirror the manifesto's penultimate sentence saying, "we need to download scientific journals and upload them to file sharing networks."

== Background and context ==
Prior to the publication of the Manifesto, Swartz had been active in the open source software, free culture, and the open access movements, such as working as an early contributor to Creative Commons, a web organization devoted to ensuring open access to a variety of different materials that would have otherwise been copyrighted. Other work includes his early programming contributions to Open Library, an organization attempting to create a comprehensive online library containing information on every book. Months before publishing the Manifesto, in 2008, Swartz worked to make thousands of federal court documents from the PACER electronic document systems available to public for free.

== Analysis of content ==
The manifesto opens with the statement that "Information is Power", and makes the case that access to knowledge is a human right. It focuses on the availability of scientific and scholarly work online, and argues for the importance of making scholarly work widely available, along with removing existing barriers to access. The Manifesto identifies restrictions to information availability as a serious problem facing both the academic community and the world at large, and criticizes both the copyright laws that have led to paywalls, along with the corporate influences and perceived greed that have supported the development of legislature supporting this. The Manifesto mentions one publisher by name: Reed Elsevier, a publisher whose articles covering a breadth of topics are hidden behind a paywall, which the author condemns as unethical. The manifesto frames one of the goals of the Open Access movement as ensuring that academics publishing their work can make it available to everyone and not be hindered by these restrictions. Additionally, the manifesto addresses the role of privilege in impacting who does and does not have access to many of these information repositories, calling attention to existing socioeconomic divides that contribute to these inequities in information availability. The Manifesto serves as a call to action, and argues that making scholarly information widely available online is a moral imperative. In order to do so, it advocates for proponents of open access to engage in civil disobedience and condones the violation of copyright law in order to make scholarly work widely available.

== Repercussions and impact ==
The open access manifesto played an important role in United States v. Swartz. In the case, the US government claimed that Swartz had violated federal laws by downloading large number of academic articles from the JSTOR academic article storage systems via the open MIT computer network. In 2013, the U.S. Secret Service released a portion of their almost 15,000 page file on Swartz, detailing their investigation of his home and chronicling the questions asked of him about the Manifesto's "human rights" applications. Swartz was facing up to 50 years in prison if found guilty of the charges against him, and remained under investigation until his eventual suicide in 2013.

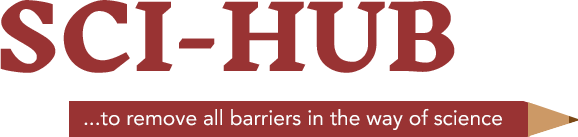
Elbakyan's online repository Sci-Hub, the creation of which was inspired by Swartz's Manifesto.

Some activists claim that Swartz was unsuccessful in achieving the specific goals he outlined in his Manifesto. The JSTOR collection acquired by Swartz was never released to public domain. Moreover, other open access activists have spoken out against the illegal activities the Manifesto called for as counterproductive to the movement's aims. In general, open access approaches have advocated for the liberation of scholarly information through legal means. Some critics of the GOA movement claim to support civil disobedience, but do not support the specific tactics called for in the manifesto. They believe the responsibility to change belongs to policymakers and scientists.

However, the symbolic ideas Swartz introduced through his Manifesto were effective in incentivizing others to take up the mantle of the open access (OA) movement. Today, many sites that once used paywalls are freely available thanks to the actions of OA activists following in Swartz's footsteps. One such activist, Alexandra Elbakyan, furthered Swartz's mission by developing an online repository she dubbed "Sci-Hub" that provides free access to over 74 million scientific journal articles. Elbakyan has been identified as a Guerilla Open Access (GOA) activist because of the transgressive and illegal practices she engages in.

== Text of the Manifesto ==
Information is power. But like all power, there are those who want to keep it for themselves. The world's entire scientific and cultural heritage, published over centuries in books and journals, is increasingly being digitized and locked up by a handful of private corporations. Want to read the papers featuring the most famous results of the sciences? You'll need to send enormous amounts to publishers like Reed Elsevier.

There are those struggling to change this. The Open Access Movement has fought valiantly to ensure that scientists do not sign their copyrights away but instead ensure their work is published on the Internet, under terms that allow anyone to access it. But even under the best scenarios, their work will only apply to things published in the future. Everything up until now will have been lost.

That is too high a price to pay. Forcing academics to pay money to read the work of their colleagues? Scanning entire libraries but only allowing the folks at Google to read them? Providing scientific articles to those at elite universities in the First World, but not to children in the Global South? It's outrageous and unacceptable.

"I agree," many say, "but what can we do? The companies hold the copyrights, they make enormous amounts of money by charging for access, and it's perfectly legal — there's nothing we can do to stop them." But there is something we can, something that's already being done: we can fight back.

Those with access to these resources — students, librarians, scientists — you have been given a privilege. You get to feed at this banquet of knowledge while the rest of the world is locked out. But you need not — indeed, morally, you cannot — keep this privilege for yourselves. You have a duty to share it with the world. And you have: trading passwords with colleagues, filling download requests for friends.

Meanwhile, those who have been locked out are not standing idly by. You have been sneaking through holes and climbing over fences, liberating the information locked up by the publishers and sharing them with your friends.

But all of this action goes on in the dark, hidden underground. It's called stealing or piracy, as if sharing a wealth of knowledge were the moral equivalent of plundering a ship and murdering its crew. But sharing isn't immoral — it's a moral imperative. Only those blinded by greed would refuse to let a friend make a copy.

Large corporations, of course, are blinded by greed. The laws under which they operate require it — their shareholders would revolt at anything less. And the politicians they have bought off back them, passing laws giving them the exclusive power to decide who can make copies.

There is no justice in following unjust laws. It's time to come into the light and, in the grand tradition of civil disobedience, declare our opposition to this private theft of public culture.

We need to take information, wherever it is stored, make our copies and share them with the world. We need to take stuff that's out of copyright and add it to the archive. We need to buy secret databases and put them on the Web. We need to download scientific journals and upload them to file sharing networks. We need to fight for Guerilla Open Access.

With enough of us, around the world, we'll not just send a strong message opposing the privatization of knowledge — we'll make it a thing of the past.

Will you join us?

Aaron Swartz

July 2008, Eremo, Italy

== See also ==
- Anna's Archive
- viki.wiki
