= Elliot R. Peters =

- Born: April 17, 1958 (age 68); New York City, U.S.
- Education: St. Paul's School; Yale University; New York University School of Law
- Occupation: Partner at Keker, Van Nest & Peters LLP
- Website: www.keker.com

Elliot R. Peters is a trial attorney at San Francisco law firm Keker, Van Nest & Peters LLP, who frequently works on cases of national significance. He is representing the PGA TOUR in an antitrust lawsuit filed by 11 professional golfers who left the PGA TOUR and joined LIV Golf. He led the defenses of internet activist Aaron Swartz and cyclist Lance Armstrong. He represented the Major League Baseball Players Association in successfully challenging DOJ seizures of baseball players' drug testing records, in the seminal computer search case, United States v Comprehensive Drug Testing, 579 F.3d 989 (2009). He has also defended financier Frank Quattrone, securities litigator William Lerach and CEO Bruce Karatz. He has represented top international law firms defending malpractice claims and technology companies defending intellectual property claims. Elliot has been named Attorney of the Year in California three times, twice for freeing indigent men, serving life sentences for murder, but who were actually innocent.
