= Ekō (organization) =

Global advocacy organization

Ekō (SumOfUs)
- Founded: 2011
- Type: NGO 501(c)(4)
- Purpose: Advocacy
- Region served: Worldwide
- Method: Online campaigning
- Key people: Taren Stinebrickner-Kauffman (founder and former ED); Hannah Lownsbrough (former ED); Emma Ruby-Sachs (Executive Director since 2020)
- Website: www.eko.org

Ekō, formerly SumOfUs, is a global non-profit advocacy organization and online community that campaigns to hold corporations accountable on issues such as climate change, workers' rights, discrimination, human rights, animal rights, corruption, and corporate power grab. The organization renamed itself to Ekō from SumOfUs in 2023.

== Founding ==
Australian-American activist Taren Stinebrickner-Kauffman is the founder of SumOfUs and was its executive director from 2011 to 2016. In November 2016, Hannah Lownsbrough replaced Stinebricker-Kauffman as the executive director of SumOfUs. In January 2020, Emma Ruby-Sachs, the daughter of activist Clayton Ruby, took over as the organization's new executive director.

== History ==
SumOfUs was launched in 2011 with campaigns targeting Google's links to the US Chamber of Commerce, a campaign to thank Starbucks for supporting same-sex marriage in the United States, and calling on Apple to force its suppliers to treat their workers more ethically.

The organization says that since its launch, it has expanded to have five million members.

SumOfUs has staff in the United Kingdom, Canada, Germany, France, Lithuania, Colombia and the Netherlands.

== Notable campaigns and reports ==
In December 2013, after pressure from SumOfUs members, major UK retailer Asos committed to stop selling Angora sourced from China after an undercover investigation revealed rabbits being plucked live for their fur. Other major UK retailers including Next, Primark, New Look and Ted Baker, and the entirety of Philip Green's Arcadia group which includes TopShop reported they had instructed suppliers to suspend sourcing of products using Angora fibre. Inditex which owns the Zara stores subsequently elected to stop releasing collections that used Angora.

In February 2014, SumOfUs demanded in a petition that "the cereal maker [Kellogg's] get tough with Wilmar or end its supply and distribution joint venture with the company". Kellogg's subsequently committed to buy only sustainably-sourced palm oil.

In 2015, SumOfUs helped to push airline companies such as Delta to stop shipping hunting trophies, lobbied Canadian officials to charge Nestle responsible water rates for drawing water from public lands, and helped get Standard Chartered Bank to cancel its financing of Adani's giant Australian coal mine.

In January 2024, Ekō's released a report that assessed the impact of popular social media platforms on young users. The report documented over 33 million posts on Instagram and TikTok directing "problematic content directed at young users", including content promoting misogyny, suicide, and eating disorders.

Following Israel's 9-day siege on Gaza in 2021, 140,000 Ekō members contacted one of the world's biggest sports brands, PUMA, to withdraw their sponsorship of the Israel Football Association. They met with the CEO of PUMA to get their message across. PUMA ended its relationship with the Israel Football Federation last year, months after the current Israeli invasion. Boycott movements also led a long-running campaign calling for Puma to end its sponsorship of Israel's national soccer team, which began in 2018. While the German sports brand terminated its sponsorship deal in December.

== Methodology ==
SumOfUs uses digital technology to organize and communicate globally, connecting consumers, workers and investors from around the world.

One of SumOfUs' primary functions is to amplify other corporate accountability organizations' campaigns by launching rapid-response campaigns.

The online campaigning NGO operates using lean start-up methodology, by adapting the "minimum viable product" model to the online campaigning field. SumOfUs mirrors corporations' global perspective and power base – and transcends national boundaries to take advantage of transnational companies' vulnerabilities.

== Financial contributors ==
SumOfUs is a registered 501(c)(4) social welfare nonprofit. Around 85% of SumOfUs funds come from small donations from its members. SumOfUs publishes the source of revenues every year on its web site. According to the Form 990 SumOfUs filed for 2016, $631,515 was contributed by a single anonymous person. According to the Form 990 SumOfUs filed for 2015, $595,000 was contributed by two anonymous donors.

== See also ==
- Internet activism
