= Aaron Swartz =

American computer programmer and activist (1986–2013)

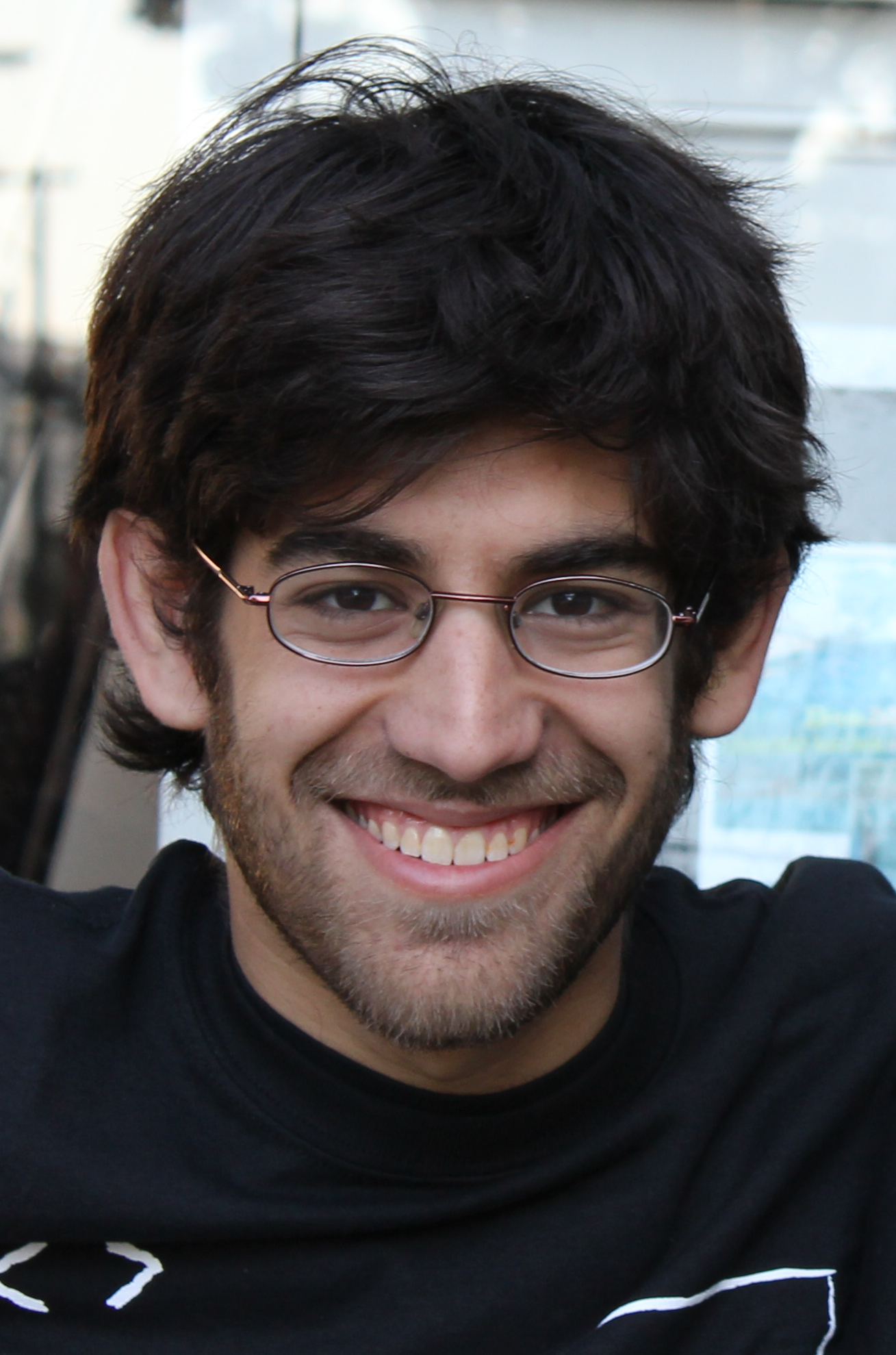
- Swartz in 2011
- Born: Aaron Hillel Swartz; November 8, 1986; Highland Park, Illinois, U.S.
- Died: January 11, 2013 (aged 26); New York City, U.S.
- Cause of death: Suicide by hanging
- Resting place: Shalom Memorial Park, Arlington Heights, Illinois, U.S. 42°07′49.9″N 88°00′03.1″W
- Education: Stanford University (no degree)
- Occupations: Software developer; writer; internet activist
- Years active: 1999–2013
- Organizations: Creative Commons (development); Jottit; Bitbots; Infogami; Reddit (co-founder); Watchdog.net; Open Library; DeadDrop; Progressive Change Campaign Committee; Demand Progress (co-founder); ThoughtWorks; Tor2web
- Title: Fellow, Harvard University Edmond J. Safra Center for Ethics
- Partners: Quinn Norton (2007–2011); Taren Stinebrickner-Kauffman (2011–2013)
- Awards: ArsDigita Prize 2000; American Library Association James Madison Award 2013 (posthumously); EFF Pioneer Award 2013 (posthumously); Internet Hall of Fame 2013 (posthumously)
- Website: aaronsw.com

Aaron Hillel Swartz (Note: Pronunciation: /ˈɛərən hɪˈlɛl ˈswɔːrts/ AIR-ən hil-EL SWORTS.) (November 8, 1986 – January 11, 2013), also known as AaronSw, was an American computer programmer, entrepreneur, writer, political organizer, and Internet hacktivist. As a programmer, Swartz helped develop the web feed format RSS; the technical architecture for Creative Commons, an organization dedicated to creating copyright licenses; and the Python website framework web.py. Swartz helped define the syntax of the lightweight markup language format Markdown, and was a co-owner of the social news aggregation website Reddit until it was fully sold in 2006 and contributed to its development until he left the company in 2007. (Note: Swartz's involvement in Reddit is debated. He is considered the co-founder of Reddit by Y Combinator owner Paul Graham as a result of the merger of Swartz's project Infogami and Reddit. With the merger of Infogami and Reddit, Swartz became a co-owner and director of parent company Not A Bug, Inc., along with Reddit cofounders Steve Huffman and Alexis Ohanian. Ohanian considers Swartz a co-owner of Reddit.) He is often credited as a martyr and a prodigy, and much of his work focused on civic awareness and progressive activism.

After Reddit was fully sold to Condé Nast Publications in 2006, Swartz became more involved in activism, helping launch the Progressive Change Campaign Committee in 2009. In 2010, he became a research fellow at Harvard University's Safra Research Lab on Institutional Corruption, directed by Lawrence Lessig. He founded the online group Demand Progress, known for its campaign against the Stop Online Piracy Act.

On January 6, 2011, Swartz was arrested by Massachusetts Institute of Technology (MIT) police on state breaking-and-entering charges after connecting a computer to the MIT network in an unmarked and unlocked closet and setting it to download academic journal articles from JSTOR using a guest user account issued to him by MIT. Federal prosecutors, led by Carmen Ortiz, charged him with two counts of wire fraud and eleven violations of the Computer Fraud and Abuse Act, carrying a cumulative maximum penalty of $1 million in fines, 35 years in prison, asset forfeiture, restitution, and supervised release. Swartz declined a plea bargain under which he would have served six months in federal prison, but would have been forced to plead guilty to federal felonies. Two days after the prosecution rejected a counter-offer by Swartz, he was found dead in his Brooklyn apartment. In 2013, Swartz was inducted posthumously into the Internet Hall of Fame.

== Early life and education ==
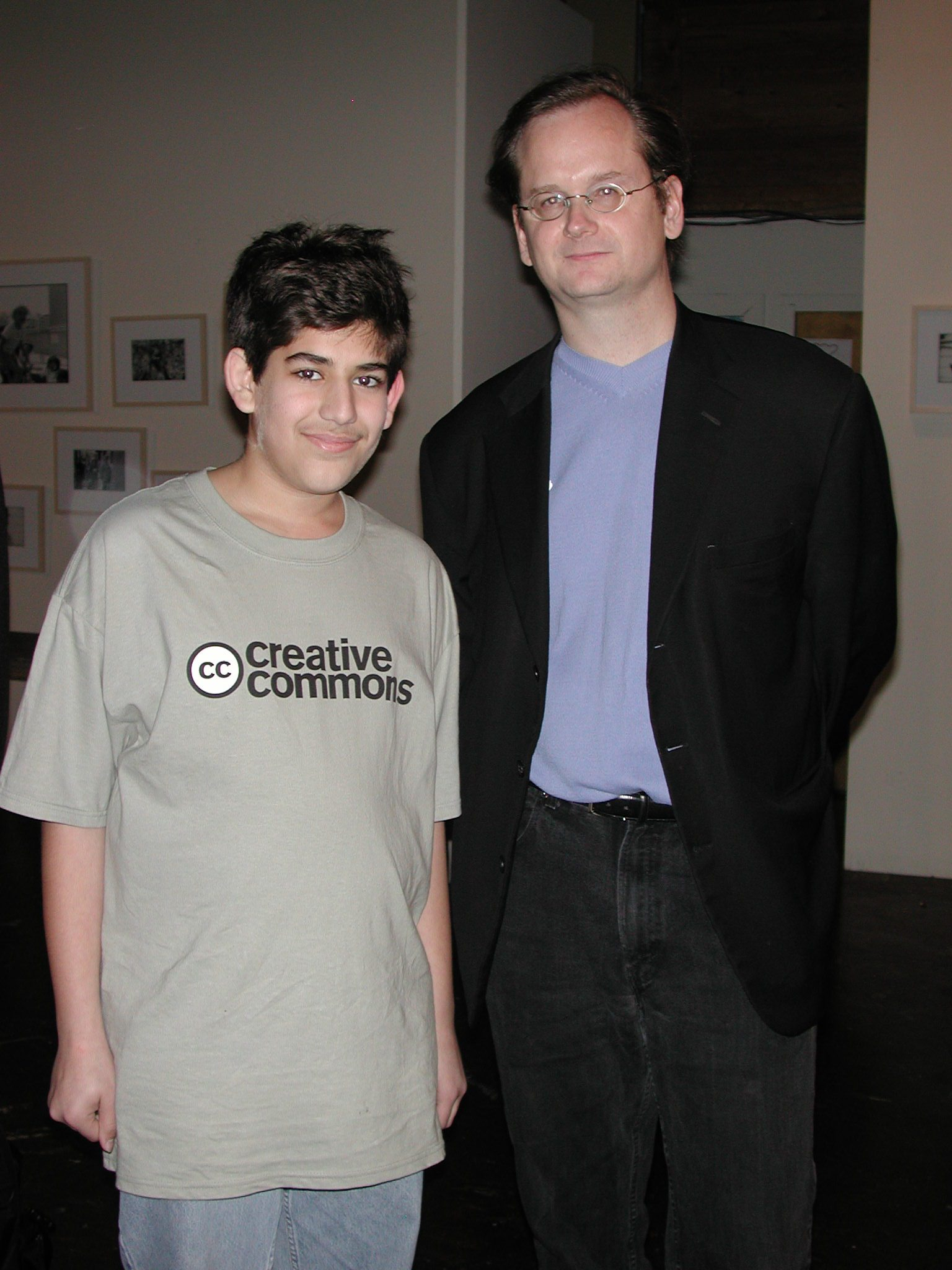
Swartz in 2002 with Lawrence Lessig at the launch party for Creative Commons

Swartz describes the nature of the shift from centralized one-to-many systems to the decentralized many-to-many topology of network communication. San Francisco, April 2007 (9:29)

Aaron Hillel Swartz was born on November 8, 1986 in Highland Park, 25 miles (40 kilometers) north of Chicago, to a Jewish family. He was the eldest child of Susan and Robert Swartz and brother to Noah and Ben Swartz. His father founded the software firm Mark Williams Company. At an early age, Swartz immersed himself in the study of computers, programming, the Internet, and Internet culture. He attended North Shore Country Day School, a small private school near Chicago, until ninth grade, when he left high school and enrolled in courses at Lake Forest College.

In 1999, at age 12, he created the website The Info Network, a user-generated encyclopedia. The site won the ArsDigita Prize, given to young people who create "useful, educational, and collaborative" noncommercial websites, and led to early recognition of Swartz's nascent talent in coding. At age 14, he became a member of the working group that authored the RSS 1.0 web syndication specification. A year later, he became involved in the Creative Commons organization.

In 2004, he enrolled at Stanford University, but left the school after his first year.

== Entrepreneurship ==
During Swartz's first year at Stanford, he applied to Y Combinator's first Summer Founders Program, proposing to work on a startup called Infogami, a flexible content management system designed to create rich and visually interesting websites or a form of wiki for structured data. After working on it with co-founder Simon Carstensen over the summer of 2005, Swartz opted not to return to Stanford, choosing instead to continue to develop and seek funding for Infogami.

As part of his work on Infogami, Swartz created the web.py web application framework because he was unhappy with other available systems in the Python programming language. In the early fall of 2005, he worked with his fellow co-founders of another nascent Y Combinator firm, Reddit, to rewrite its Lisp codebase using Python and web.py. Although Infogami's platform was abandoned after Not a Bug was acquired, Infogami's software was used to support the Internet Archive's Open Library project and the web.py web framework was used as the basis for many other projects by Swartz and many others.

When Infogami failed to find further funding, Y Combinator organizers suggested Infogami merge with Reddit, which it did in November 2005, creating a new firm, Not a Bug, devoted to promoting both products. As a result, Swartz was given the title of co-founder of Reddit. Although both projects initially struggled, Reddit made large gains in popularity in 2005–2006.

In October 2006, based largely on Reddit's success, Not a Bug was acquired by Condé Nast Publications, owner of Wired magazine. Swartz moved with his company to San Francisco to continue to work on Reddit for Wired. He found corporate office life uncongenial and in January 2007 was asked to resign from the company. In September 2007, he joined Infogami co-founder Simon Carstensen to launch a new firm, Jottit, in another attempt to create a Markdown-driven content management system in Python.

== Activism ==
In 2008, Swartz founded Watchdog.net, "the good government site with teeth", to aggregate and visualize data about politicians. That year, he wrote a widely circulated Guerilla Open Access Manifesto. On December 27, 2010, he filed a Freedom of Information Act (FOIA) request to learn about the treatment of Chelsea Manning, alleged source for WikiLeaks. His activism has been praised by digital rights groups such as the Electronic Frontier Foundation (EFF).

=== PACER ===
In 2008, Swartz downloaded about 2.7 million federal court documents stored in the PACER (Public Access to Court Electronic Records) database managed by the Administrative Office of the United States Courts. The Huffington Post characterized his actions this way: "Swartz downloaded public court documents from the PACER system in an effort to make them available outside of the expensive service. The move drew the attention of the FBI, which ultimately decided not to press charges as the documents were, in fact, public."

PACER was charging eight cents per page for information that Carl Malamud, who founded the nonprofit group Public.Resource.Org, contended should be free, because federal documents are not covered by copyright. The fees were "plowed back to the courts to finance technology, but the system [ran] a budget surplus of some $150 million, according to court reports," reported The New York Times. PACER used technology that was "designed in the bygone days of screechy telephone modems ... putting the nation's legal system behind a wall of cash and kludge." Malamud appealed to fellow activists, urging them to visit one of 17 libraries conducting a free trial of the PACER system, download court documents, and send them to him for public distribution.

After reading Malamud's call for action, Swartz used a Perl computer script running on Amazon cloud servers to download the documents, using credentials belonging to a Sacramento library. From September 4 to 20, 2008, it accessed documents and uploaded them to a cloud computing service. He released the documents to Malamud's organization.

On September 29, 2008, the GPO suspended the free trial, "pending an evaluation" of the program. Swartz's actions were subsequently investigated by the FBI. The case was closed after two months with no charges filed. Swartz learned the details of the investigation after filing a FOIA request with the FBI, and described their response as the "usual mess of confusions that shows the FBI's lack of sense of humor."

At a 2013 memorial for Swartz, Malamud recalled their work with PACER. They brought millions of U.S. District Court records out from behind PACER's "pay wall", he said, and found them full of privacy violations, including medical records and the names of minor children and confidential informants.

We sent our results to the Chief Judges of 31 District Courts ... They redacted those documents and they yelled at the lawyers that filed them ... The Judicial Conference changed their privacy rules. ... [To] the bureaucrats who ran the Administrative Office of the United States Courts ... we were thieves that took $1.6 million of their property. So they called the FBI ... [The FBI] found nothing wrong ...

A more detailed account of his collaboration with Swartz on the PACER project appears in an essay on Malamud's website.

Writing in Ars Technica, Timothy Lee, who later made use of the documents obtained by Swartz as a co-creator of RECAP, offered some insight into discrepancies in reports on how much data Swartz downloaded: "In a back-of-the-envelope calculation a few days before the offsite crawl was shut down, Swartz guessed he got around 25 percent of the documents in PACER. The New York Times similarly reported Swartz had downloaded "an estimated 20 percent of the entire database". Based on the facts that Swartz downloaded 2.7 million documents while PACER, at the time, contained 500 million, Lee concluded that Swartz downloaded less than one percent of the database.

=== Progressive Change Campaign Committee ===
In 2009, wanting to learn about effective activism, Swartz helped launch the Progressive Change Campaign Committee. He wrote in his blog: "I spend my days experimenting with new ways to get progressive policies enacted and progressive politicians elected." He led the first activism event of his career with the Progressive Change Campaign Committee, delivering thousands of "Honor Kennedy" petition signatures to Massachusetts legislators, asking them to fulfill former Senator Ted Kennedy's last wish by appointing a senator to vote for healthcare reform.

=== Demand Progress ===
In 2010, Swartz co-founded Demand Progress, a political advocacy group that organizes people online to "take action by contacting Congress and other leaders, funding pressure tactics, and spreading the word" about civil liberties, government reform, and other issues. During academic year 2010–11, Swartz conducted research studies on political corruption as a Lab Fellow in Harvard University's Edmond J. Safra Research Lab on Institutional Corruption. Author Cory Doctorow, in his novel Homeland, "drew on advice from Swartz in setting out how his protagonist could use the information now available about voters to create a grass-roots anti-establishment political campaign." In an afterword to the novel, Swartz wrote: "These political hacktivist tools can be used by anyone motivated and talented enough.... Now it's up to you to change the system. ... Let me know if I can help."

=== Opposition to the Stop Online Piracy Act (SOPA) ===
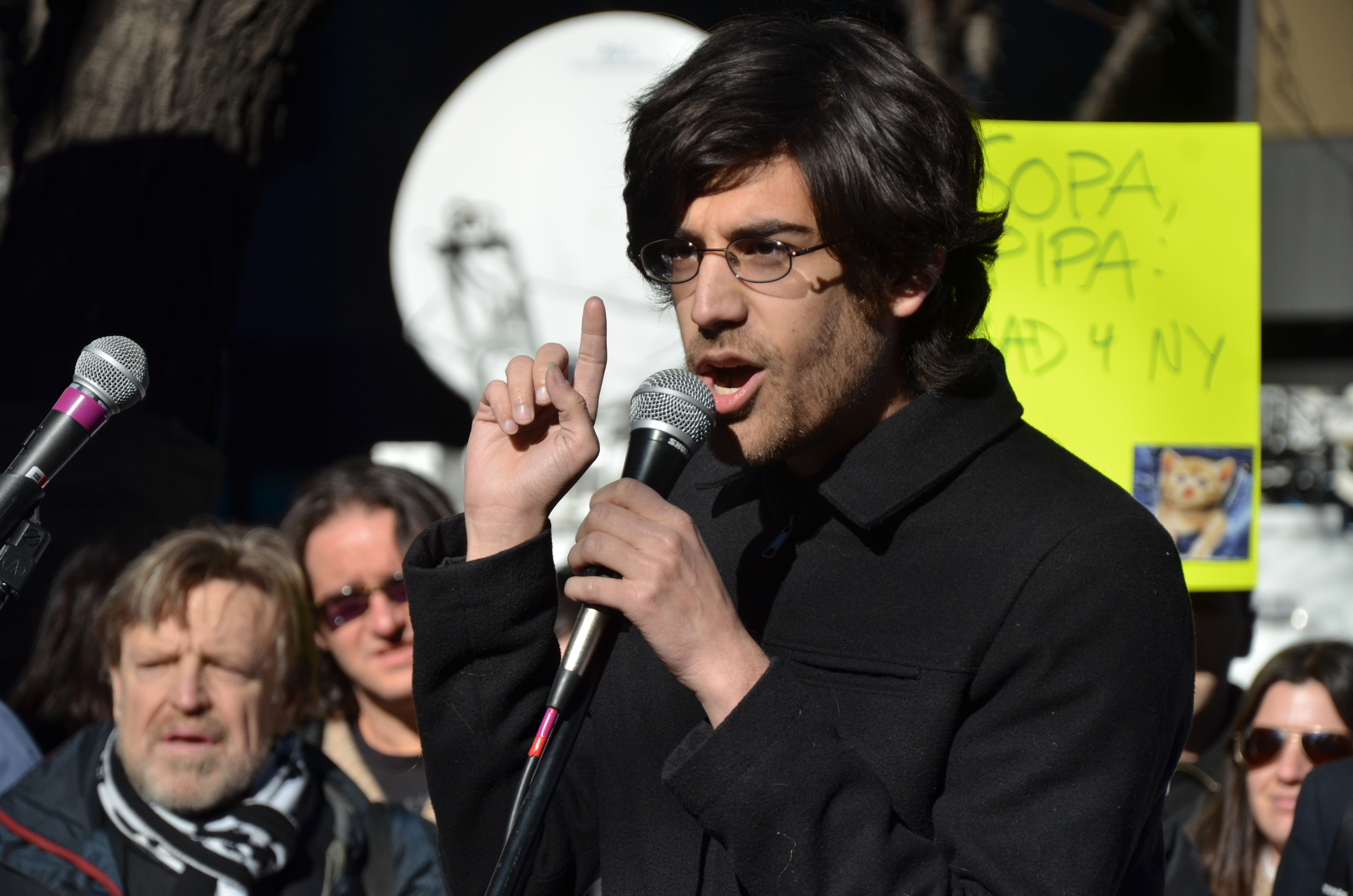
Swartz in 2012 protesting against the Stop Online Piracy Act (SOPA), along with Occupy Wall Street movement

Swartz was involved in the campaign to prevent passage of the Stop Online Piracy Act (SOPA), which sought to combat Internet copyright violations but was criticized on the basis that it would make it easier for the U.S. government to shut down web sites accused of violating copyright and would place intolerable burdens on Internet providers. After the bill's defeat, Swartz was the keynote speaker at the F2C:Freedom to Connect 2012 event in Washington, D.C., on May 21, 2012. In his speech, "How We Stopped SOPA", he said:

This bill ... shut down whole websites. Essentially, it stopped Americans from communicating entirely with certain groups....
I called all my friends, and we stayed up all night setting up a website for this new group, Demand Progress, with an online petition opposing this noxious bill.... We [got] ... 300,000 signers.... We met with the staff of members of Congress and pleaded with them.... And then it passed unanimously....
And then, suddenly, the process stopped. Senator Ron Wyden ... put a hold on the bill.

He added, "We won this fight because everyone made themselves the hero of their own story. Everyone took it as their job to save this crucial freedom." He was referring to a series of protests against the bill by numerous websites, described by the Electronic Frontier Foundation as the biggest protest in Internet history, with over 115,000 sites participating according to the nonprofit organization Fight for the Future. Swartz also spoke on the topic at an event organized by ThoughtWorks.

=== Wikipedia ===
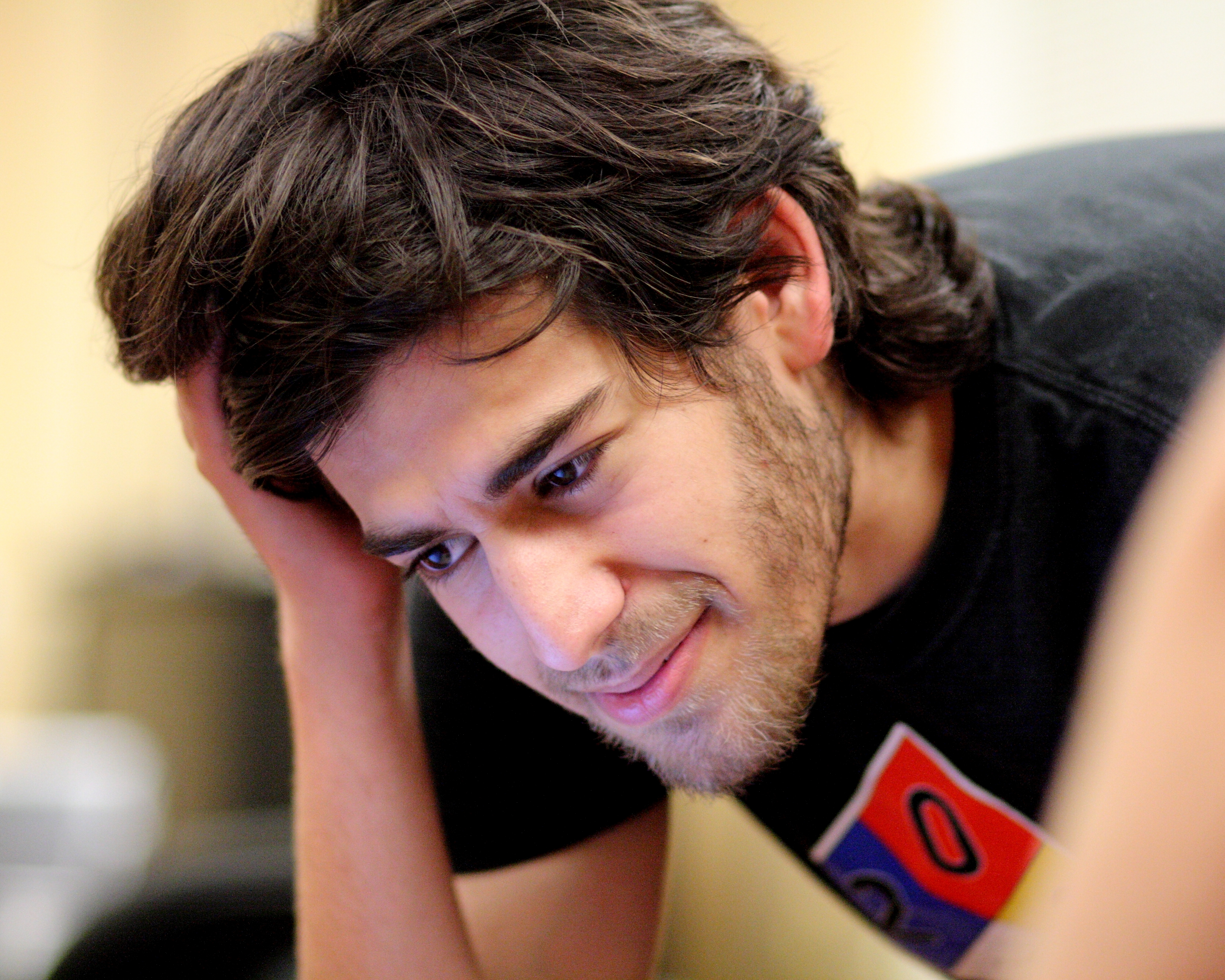
Swartz at the Boston Wikipedia Meetup in 2009

Swartz participated in Wikipedia beginning in August 2003 under the username AaronSw. In 2006, he ran unsuccessfully for the Wikimedia Foundation's Board of Trustees. Also in 2006, Swartz wrote an analysis of how Wikipedia articles are written, and concluded that the bulk of its content came from tens of thousands of occasional contributors, or "outsiders", each of whom made few other contributions to the site, while a core group of 500 to 1,000 regular editors tended to correct spelling and other formatting errors. He said: "The formatters aid the contributors, not the other way around." His conclusions, based on the analysis of edit histories of several randomly selected articles, contradicted the opinion of Wikipedia co-founder Jimmy Wales, who believed the core group of regular editors provided most of the content while thousands of others contributed to formatting issues. Swartz came to his conclusions by counting the number of characters editors added to particular articles, while Wales counted the total number of edits.

=== WikiLeaks ===
In January 2013, shortly after he died, WikiLeaks said that Aaron Swartz had helped WikiLeaks and talked to Julian Assange in 2010 and 2011. WikiLeaks also said they had "strong reasons to believe, but cannot prove" he may have been a source, possibly breaking WikiLeaks' rules about source anonymity.

== United States v. Aaron Swartz ==
According to state and federal authorities, Swartz used JSTOR, a digital repository, to download a large number (Note: The MIT network administration office told MIT police that "approximately 70 gigabytes of data had been downloaded, 98% of which was from JSTOR." The first federal indictment alleged "approximately 4.8 million articles", "1.7 million" of which "were made available by independent publishers for purchase through JSTOR's Publisher Sales Service." The subsequent DOJ press release alleged "over four million articles". The superseding indictment removed the estimates and instead characterized the amount as "a major portion of the total archive in which JSTOR had invested.") of academic journal articles through MIT's computer network over the course of a few weeks in late 2010 and early 2011. Visitors to MIT's "open campus" were authorized to access JSTOR through its network; Swartz, as a research fellow at Harvard University, also had a JSTOR account.

=== Article download ===
On September 25, 2010, the IP address 18.55.6.215, part of the MIT network, began sending hundreds of PDF download requests per minute to the JSTOR website, enough to slow the site's performance. This prompted a block of the IP address. In the morning, another IP address, also from within the MIT network, began sending more PDF download requests, resulting in a temporary block on the firewall level of all MIT computers in the entire 18.0.0.0/8 range. A JSTOR employee emailed MIT on September 29, 2010:

Note that this was an extreme case. We typically suspend just one individual IP at a time and do that relatively infrequently (perhaps 6 on a busy day, from 7000+ institutional subscribers). In this case, we saw a performance hit on the live site, which I have only seen about 3 or 4 times in my 5 years here. The pattern used was to create a new session for each PDF download or every few, which was terribly efficient, but not terribly subtle. In the end, we saw over 200K sessions in one hour's time during the peak.

According to authorities, Swartz downloaded the documents through a laptop connected to a networking switch in a controlled-access wiring closet at MIT. The closet's door was kept unlocked, according to press reports. When it was discovered, a video camera was placed in the room to record Swartz; his computer was left untouched. The recording was stopped once Swartz was identified, but rather than pursue a civil lawsuit against him, JSTOR settled with him in June 2011; under the terms of the settlement, he surrendered the downloaded data.

On July 30, 2013, JSTOR released 300 partially redacted documents used as incriminating evidence against Swartz, originally sent to the United States Attorney's Office in response to subpoenas in the case United States v. Aaron Swartz.

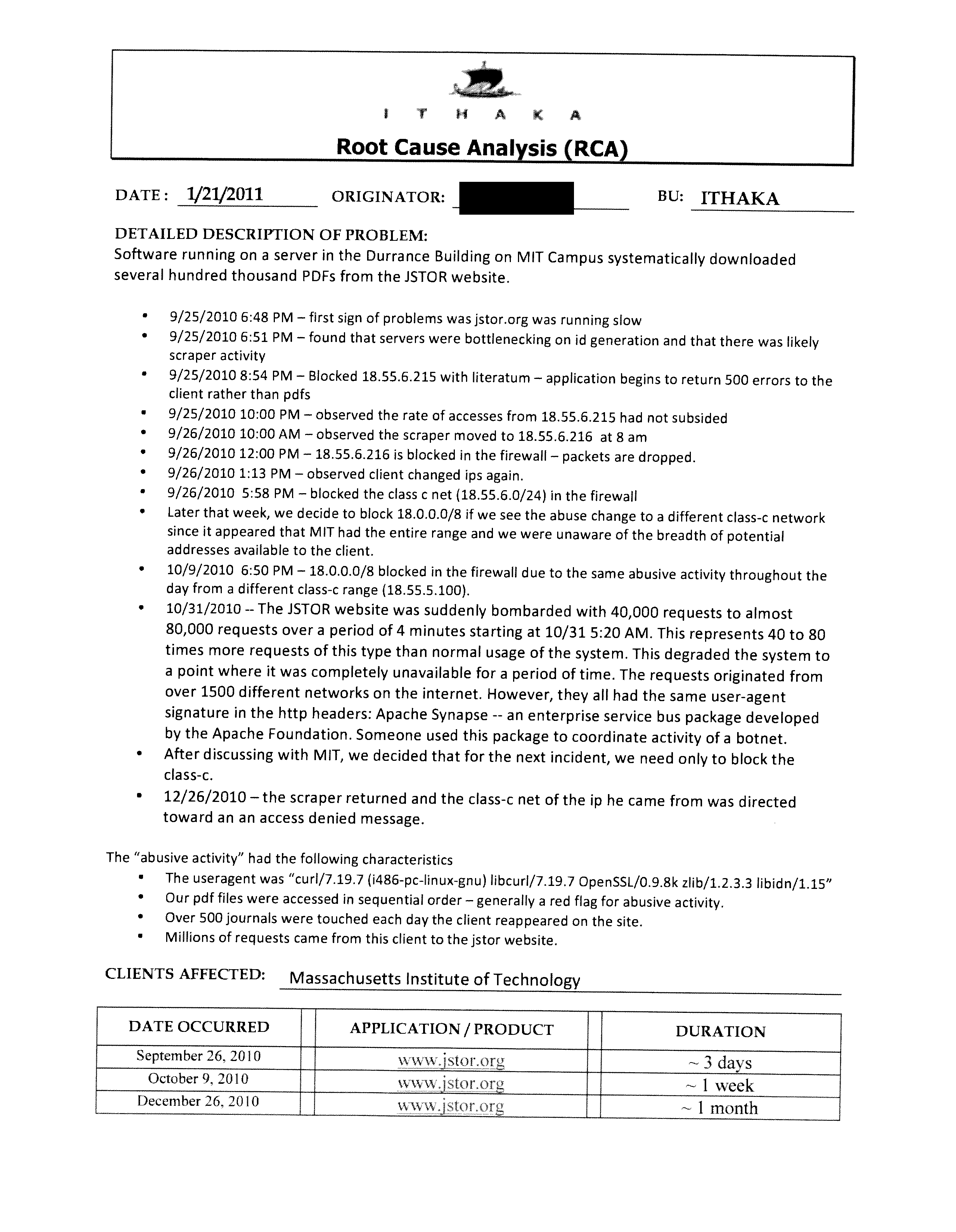
"Root Cause Analysis" Report (side 1), showing a descriptive timeline of events from September 25, 2010, until December 26, 2010

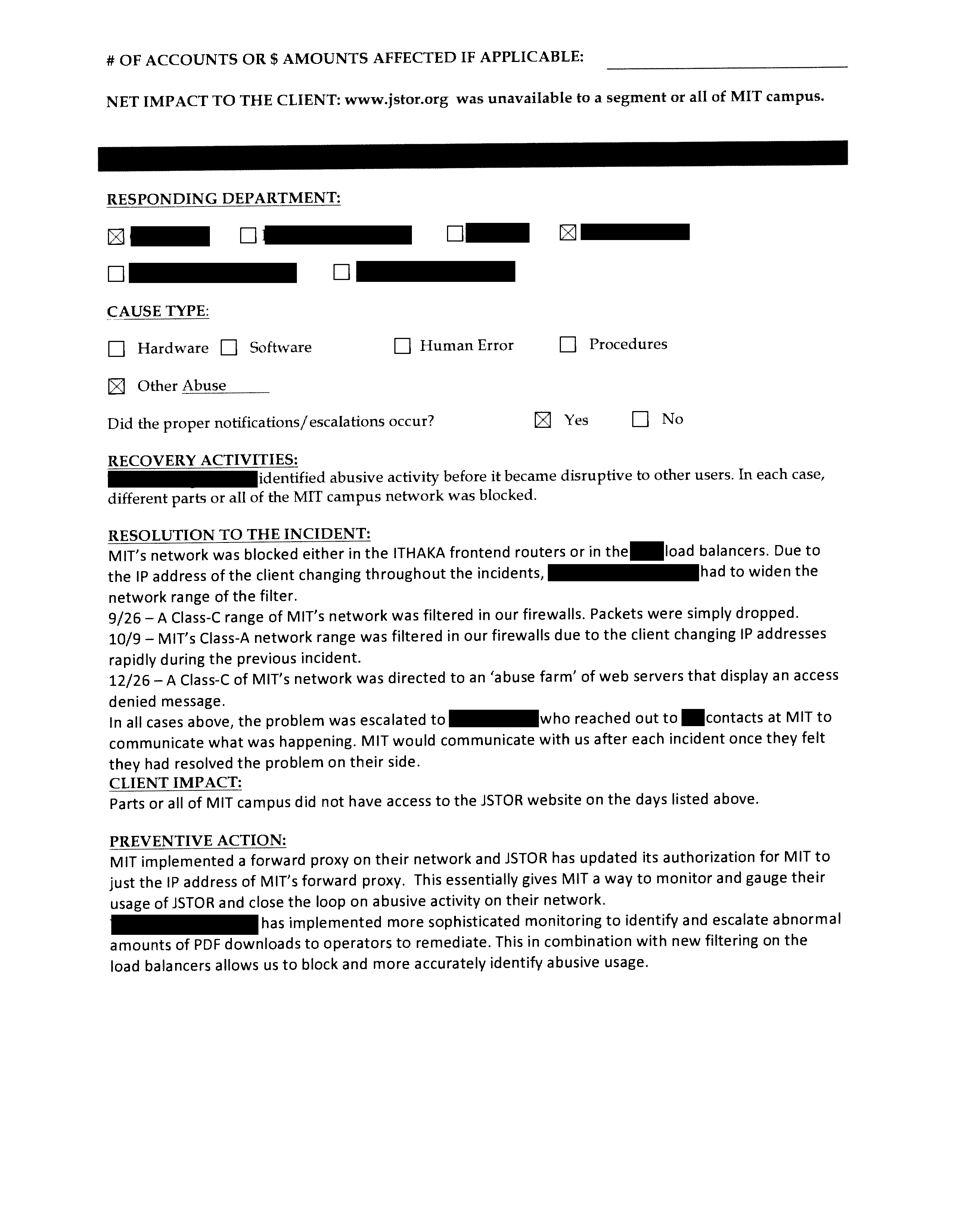
"Root Cause Analysis" Report (side 2), showing JSTOR response and incident resolution procedures

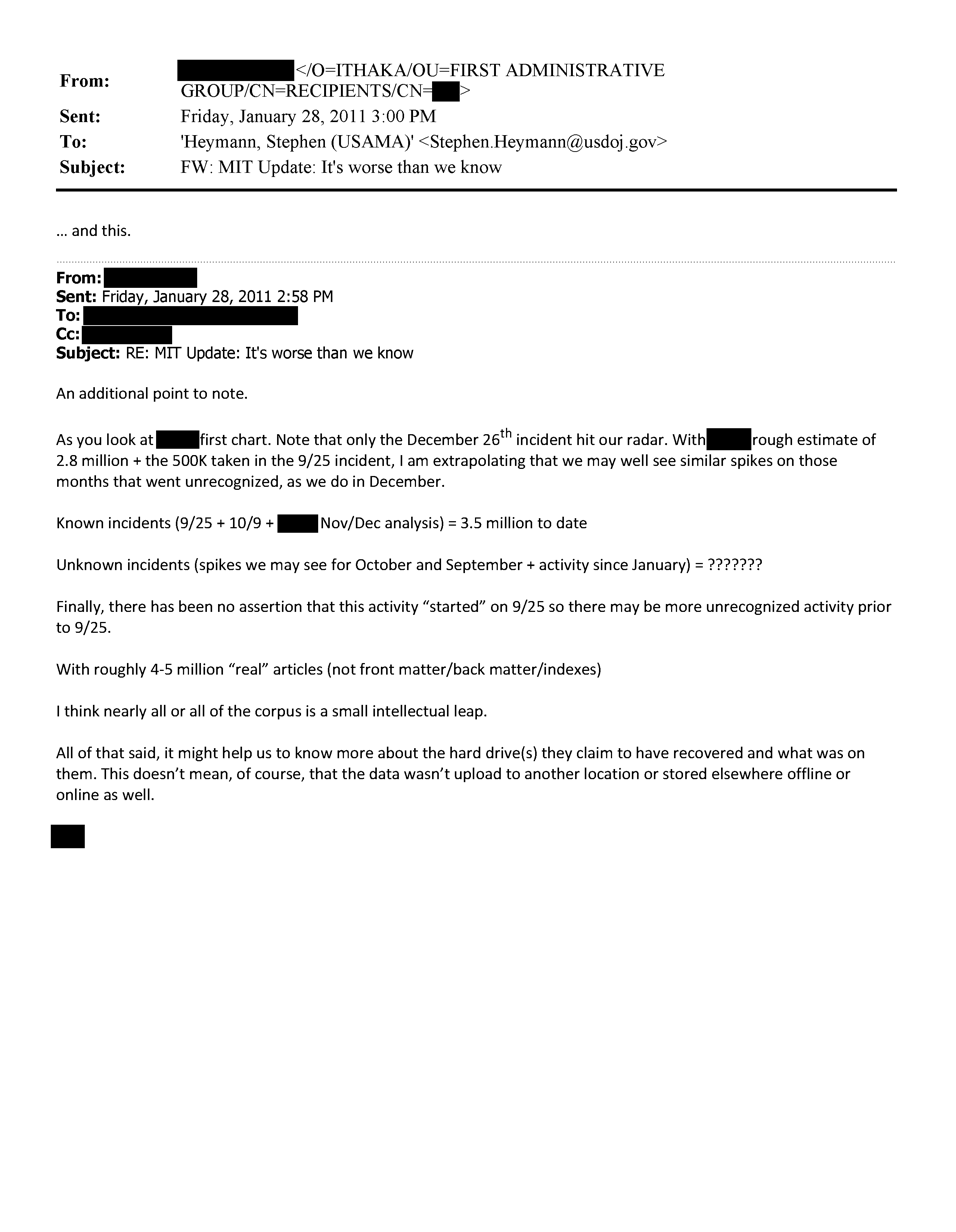
Email sent from JSTOR to Stephen Heymann (USAMA), estimating 3.5 million PDF files had been downloaded

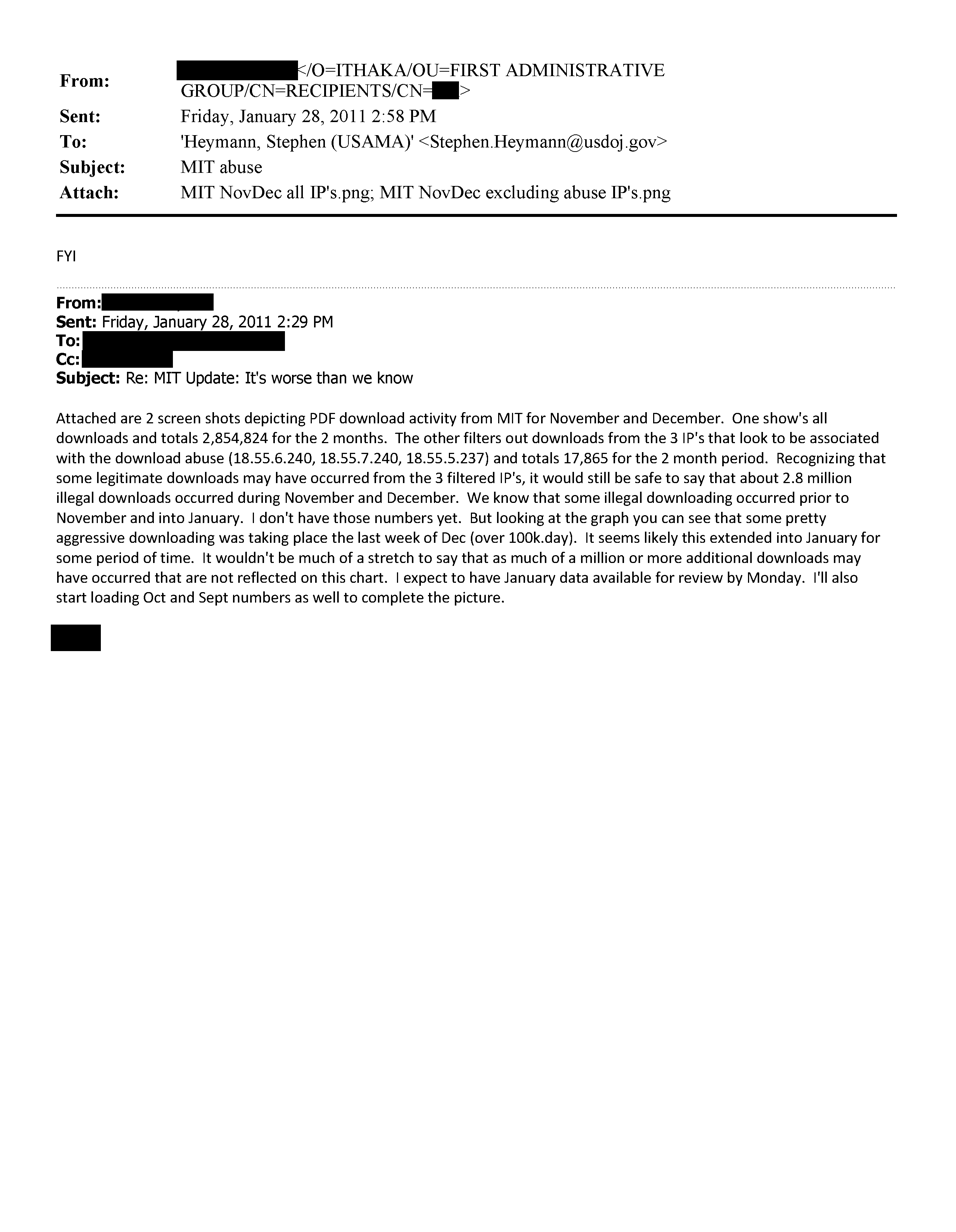
Email describing PDF download activity snapshots

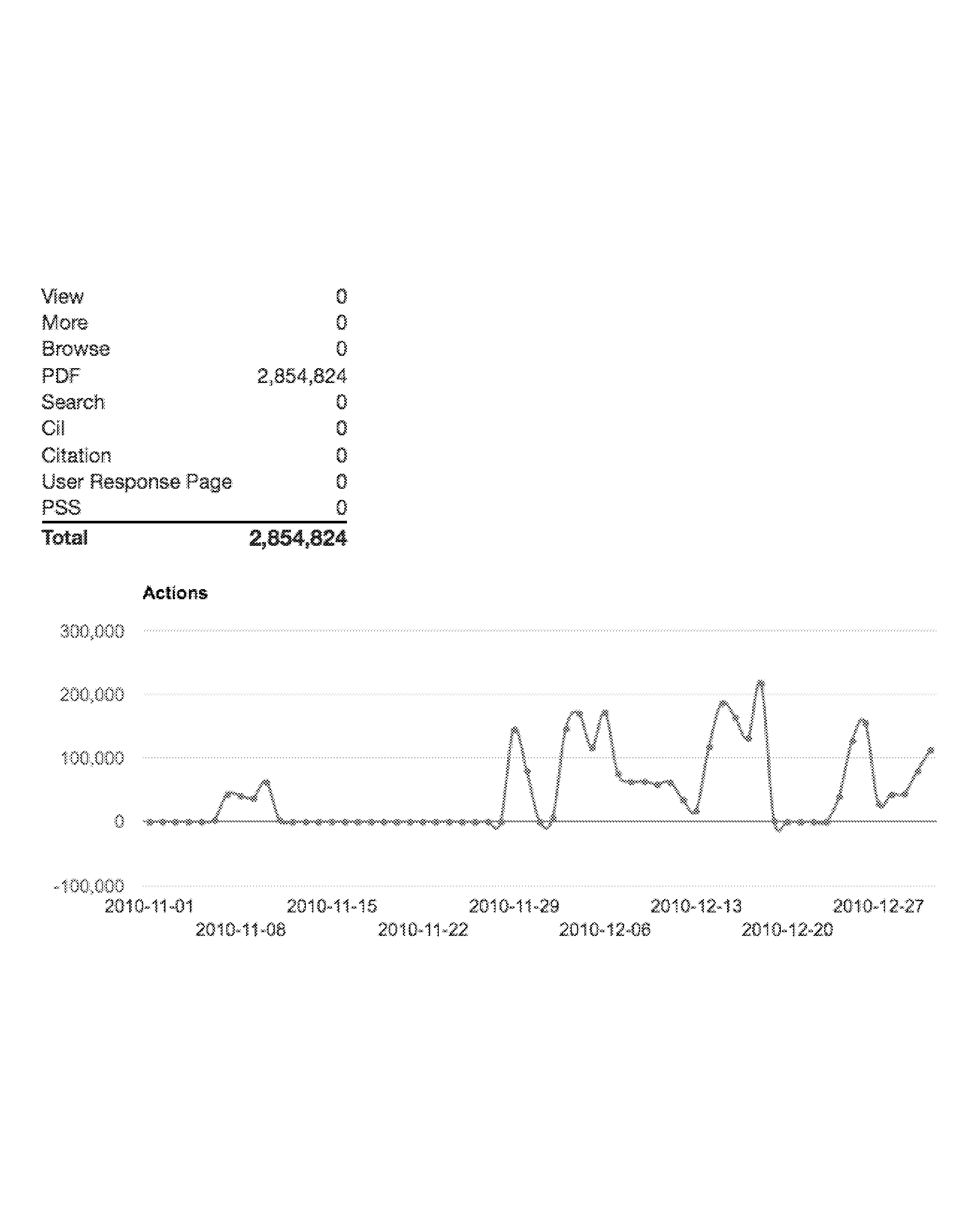
PDF download activity, from JSTOR's databases to MIT computers, between November 1 and December 27

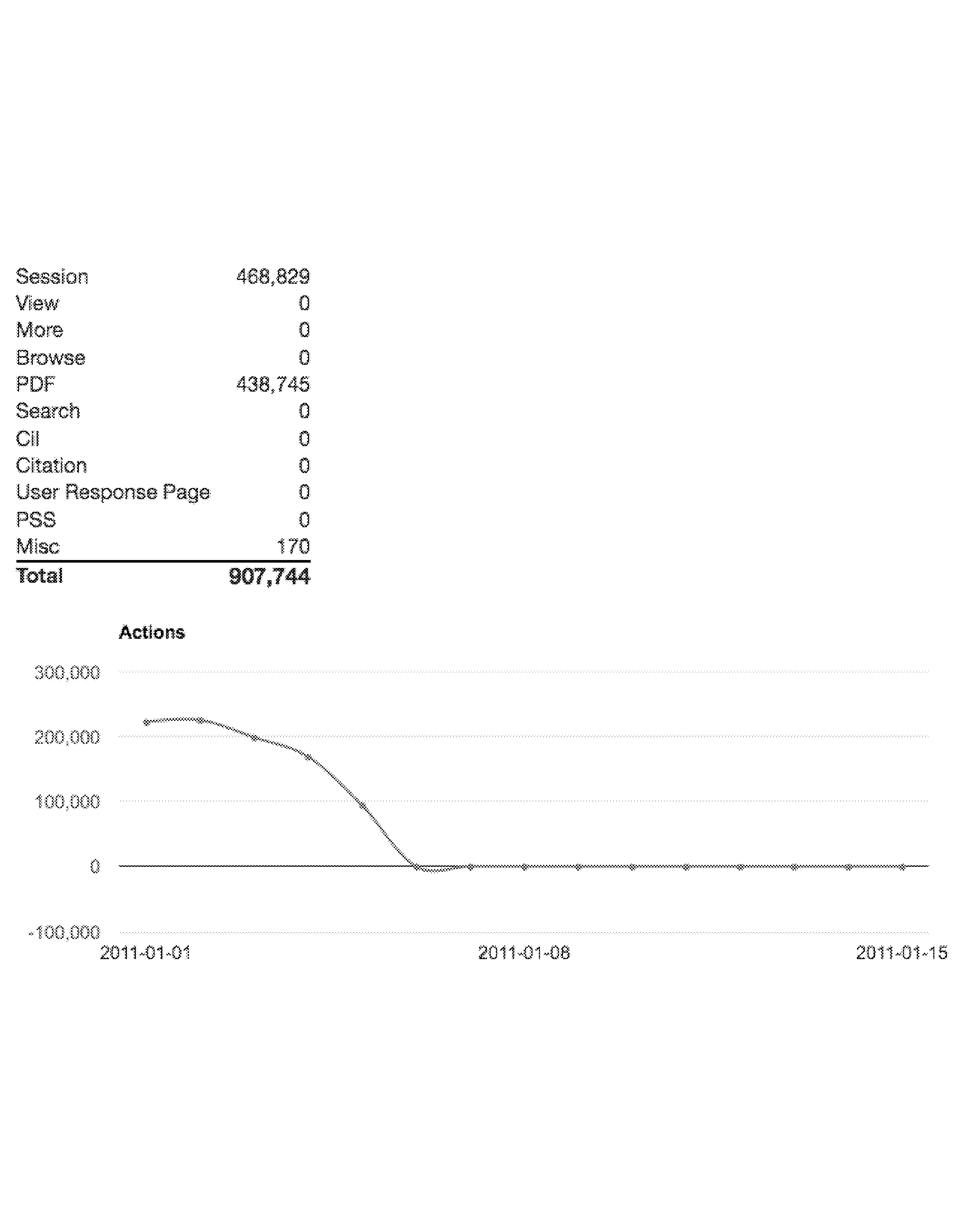
PDF activity, from JSTOR to MIT, between January 1 to 15

=== Arrest and prosecution ===
On the night of January 6, 2011, Swartz was arrested near the Harvard campus by MIT Police and a Secret Service agent, and arraigned in Cambridge District Court on two state charges of breaking and entering with intent to commit a felony. On July 11, 2011, he was indicted by a federal grand jury on charges of wire fraud, computer fraud, unlawfully obtaining information from a protected computer, and recklessly damaging a protected computer.

On November 17, 2011, Swartz was indicted by a Middlesex County Superior Court grand jury on state charges of breaking and entering with intent, grand larceny, and unauthorized access to a computer network. On December 16, 2011, state prosecutors filed a notice that they were dropping the two original charges, and the charges listed in the November 17, 2011, indictment were dropped on March 8, 2012. According to a spokesperson for the Middlesex County prosecutor, this was done to avoid impeding a federal prosecution headed by Stephen P. Heymann, supported by evidence provided by Secret Service agent Michael S. Pickett.

On September 12, 2012, federal prosecutors filed a superseding indictment adding nine more felony counts, increasing Swartz's maximum criminal exposure to 50 years of imprisonment and $1 million in fines. During plea negotiations with Swartz's attorneys, the prosecutors offered to recommend a sentence of six months in a low-security prison if Swartz pled guilty to 13 federal crimes. Swartz and his lead attorney rejected the deal, opting instead for a trial where prosecutors would be forced to justify their pursuit of him.

The federal prosecution involved what was characterized by numerous critics (such as former Nixon White House counsel John Dean) as an "overcharging" 13-count indictment and "overzealous", "Nixonian" prosecution for alleged computer crimes, brought by then U.S. Attorney for Massachusetts Carmen Ortiz. Swartz died by suicide on January 11, 2013. After his death, federal prosecutors dropped the charges. On December 4, 2013, due to a Freedom of Information Act suit by the investigations editor of Wired magazine, several documents related to the case were released by the Secret Service, including a video of Swartz entering the MIT network closet.

== Personal life ==
Swartz was in an open relationship with Quinn Norton between 2007 and 2011 and dated Taren Stinebrickner-Kauffman from 2011 until his death in 2013, contemplating marriage with her. He also reportedly had same-sex relationships, and was skeptical of the idea of sexual identity. Aside from his work, he posted frequently on Twitter, Reddit and his personal website. He was an atheist.

== Death ==
External videos
- Aaron Swartz Memorial at The Great Hall of Cooper Union on YouTube, (transcript)
- Aaron Swartz Memorial at the Internet Archive on YouTube, (partial transcript)
- DC Memorial: Darrell Issa, Taren Stinebrickner-Kauffman, Alan Grayson on YouTube

On the evening of January 11, 2013, Swartz's girlfriend, Stinebrickner-Kauffman, found him dead in his Brooklyn apartment. A spokesperson for New York's Medical Examiner reported that he had hanged himself. No suicide note was found. Swartz's family and girlfriend created a memorial website on which they wrote: "He used his prodigious skills as a programmer and technologist not to enrich himself but to make the Internet and the world a fairer, better place."

Days before Swartz's funeral, Lawrence Lessig eulogized him in an essay, "Prosecutor as Bully". He decried the disproportionality of Swartz's prosecution and said, "The question this government needs to answer is why it was so necessary that Aaron Swartz be labeled a 'felon'. For in the 18 months of negotiations, that was what he was not willing to accept." Cory Doctorow wrote, "Aaron had an unbeatable combination of political insight, technical skill, and intelligence about people and issues. I think he could have revolutionized American (and worldwide) politics. His legacy may still yet do so."

=== Funeral and memorial gatherings ===
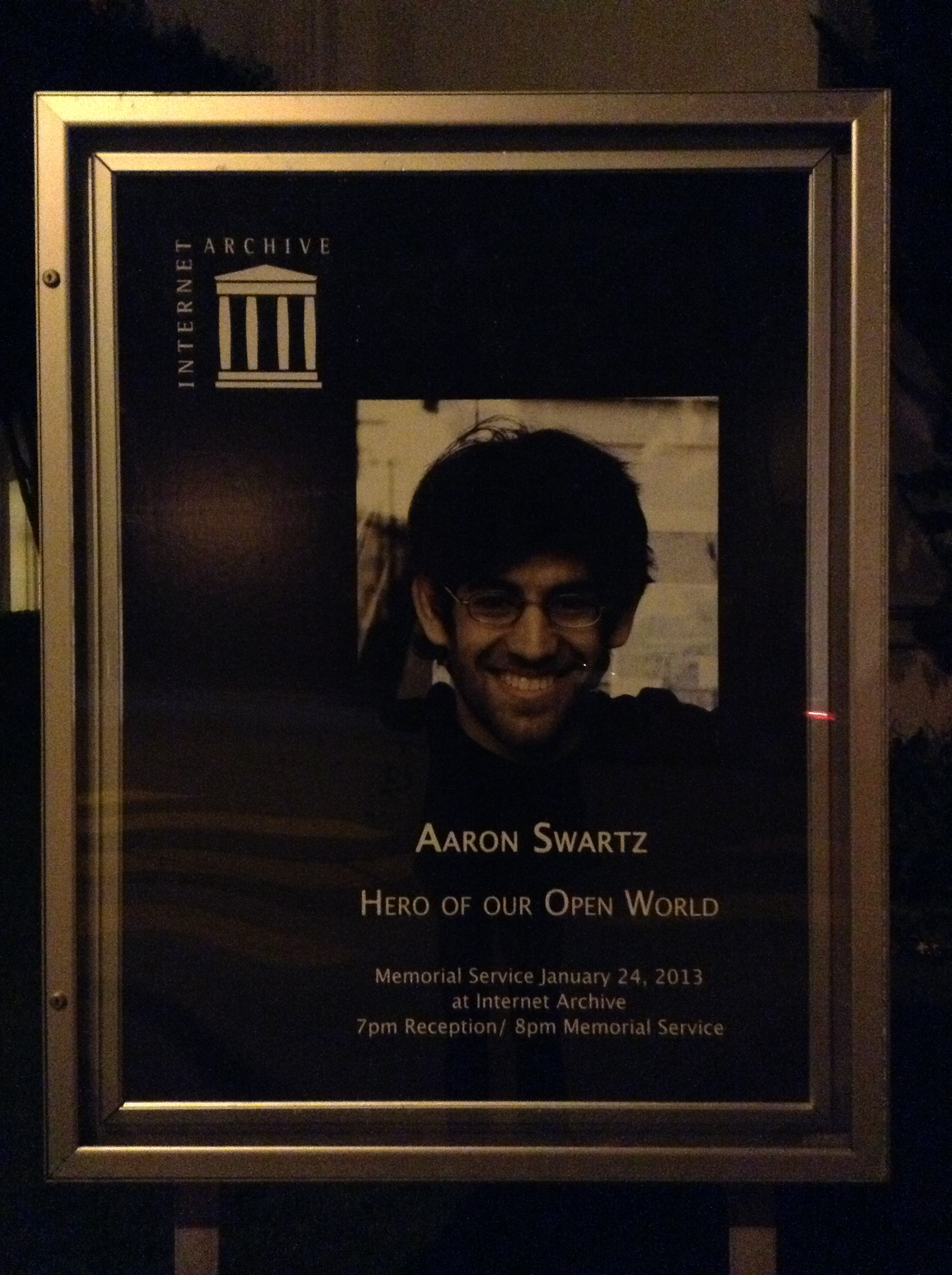
Aaron Swartz Memorial sign at Internet Archive headquarters, San Francisco, January 24, 2013

Swartz's funeral services were held on January 15, 2013, at Central Avenue Synagogue in Highland Park, Illinois. Tim Berners-Lee, creator of the World Wide Web, delivered a eulogy. He is buried at Shalom Memorial Park in Arlington Heights. The same day, The Wall Street Journal published a story based in part on an interview with Taren Stinebrickner-Kauffman. She told the Journal that Swartz lacked the money to pay for a trial and "it was too hard for him to ... make that part of his life go public" by asking for help. He was also distressed, she said, because two of his friends had just been subpoenaed and because he no longer believed that MIT would try to stop the prosecution. For donations in his memory, Swartz's family recommended GiveWell, an organization Swartz admired, had collaborated with, and made his sole beneficiary in his will.

Several memorials followed. On January 19, hundreds attended a memorial at the Cooper Union, speakers at which included Taren Stinebrickner-Kauffman, open source advocate Doc Searls, Creative Commons' Glenn Otis Brown, journalist Quinn Norton, Roy Singham of ThoughtWorks, and David Segal of Demand Progress. On January 24, there was a memorial at the Internet Archive headquarters in San Francisco (video) at which Stinebrickner-Kauffman, Alex Stamos, Brewster Kahle, Peter Eckersley, and Carl Malamud spoke. On February 4, a memorial was held in the Cannon House Office Building on Capitol Hill; speakers included Senator Ron Wyden and Representatives Darrell Issa, Alan Grayson, and Jared Polis. Other lawmakers in attendance included Senator Elizabeth Warren and Representatives Zoe Lofgren and Jan Schakowsky. Harvey Silverglate was a featured speaker at a Demand Progress rally in Swartz's memory. A memorial also took place on March 12 at the MIT Media Lab. On February 2, 2025, a statue of Swartz was unveiled at the Internet Archive building in San Francisco. This was organized by Pablo Peniche and Lisa Rein. The statue stands in the building's lobby.

== Response ==
=== U.S. Department of Justice ===
Carmen M. Ortiz, then U.S. Attorney for the District of Massachusetts, said in a statement: "As a parent and a sister, I can only imagine the pain felt by the family and friends of Aaron Swartz, ... I must, however, make clear that this office's conduct was appropriate in bringing and handling this case."

=== Family response ===
Aaron's death is not simply a personal tragedy. It is the product of a criminal justice system rife with intimidation and prosecutorial overreach. Decisions made by officials in the Massachusetts U.S. Attorney's office and at MIT contributed to his death.

— Statement by his family and his partner

On January 12, 2013, Swartz's family and partner issued a statement criticizing the prosecutors and MIT. Speaking at his son's funeral on January 15, Robert Swartz said, "Aaron was killed by the government, and MIT betrayed all of its basic principles." Ortiz's husband, Tom Dolan, responded: "Truly incredible that in their own son's obit they blame others for his death and make no mention of the 6-month offer." This comment triggered some criticism; in Esquire, Charlie Pierce wrote, "the glibness with which her husband and her defenders toss off a 'mere' six months in federal prison, low-security or not, is a further indication that something is seriously out of whack with the way our prosecutors think these days."

=== MIT ===
At the time, MIT maintained an open-campus policy along with an "open network". Two days after Swartz's death, MIT President L. Rafael Reif commissioned professor Hal Abelson to lead an analysis of MIT's options and decisions relating to Swartz's "legal struggles". To help guide the fact-finding stage of the review, MIT created a website where community members could suggest questions and issues for the review to address.

Swartz's attorneys requested that all pretrial discovery documents be made public, a move MIT opposed. Swartz allies have criticized MIT's opposition to releasing the evidence. On July 26, 2013, the Abelson panel submitted a report to Reif, who authorized its public release on July 30. The panel reported that MIT had not supported charges against Swartz and cleared the institution of wrongdoing, but also noted that despite MIT's advocacy for open access culture at the institutional level and beyond, the university never extended that support to Swartz. The report revealed, for example, that while MIT considered issuing a public statement about its position on the case, it never did so.

=== Press ===
The Huffington Post reported, "Ortiz has faced significant backlash for pursuing the case against Swartz, including a petition to the White House to have her fired." Other news outlets reported similarly. Reuters news agency called Swartz "an online icon" who "help[ed] to make a virtual mountain of information freely available to the public, including an estimated 19 million pages of federal court documents." The Associated Press (AP) reported that Swartz's case "highlights society's uncertain, evolving view of how to treat people who break into computer systems and share data not to enrich themselves, but to make it available to others," and that JSTOR's lawyer, former U.S. Attorney for the Southern District of New York Mary Jo White, had asked the lead prosecutor to drop the charges.

As editor Hrag Vartanian writes in Hyperallergic, the Brooklyn muralist BAMN ("By Any Means Necessary") created a mural of Swartz. "Swartz was an amazing human being who fought tirelessly for our right to a free and open Internet", BAMN said. "He was much more than just the 'Reddit guy'." On April 17, 2013, Yuval Noah Harari called Swartz "the first martyr of the Freedom of Information movement". But according to Harari, Swartz's stance did not illustrate belief in the freedom of persons or speech but stemmed from his generation's conviction that above all else, information should be free. Swartz's legacy has reportedly strengthened the open access to scholarship movement. In Illinois, his home state, Swartz's influence led state university faculties to adopt policies in favor of open access.

=== Internet ===
==== Hacks ====
On January 13, 2013, members of Anonymous hacked two websites on the MIT domain, replacing them with tributes to Swartz that called on members of the Internet community to use his death as a rallying point for the open access movement. The banner included a list of demands for improvements in the U.S. copyright system, along with Swartz's Guerilla Open Access Manifesto. On the night of January 18, MIT's email system was taken offline for ten hours. On January 22, email sent to MIT was redirected by hackers Aush0k and TibitXimer to the Korea Advanced Institute of Science & Technology. All other traffic to MIT was redirected to a computer at Harvard University that was publishing a statement headed "R.I.P Aaron Swartz", with text from a 2009 post by Swartz, accompanied by a chiptune version of "The Star-Spangled Banner". MIT regained full control after about seven hours. In the early hours of January 26, Anonymous hacked the U.S. Sentencing Commission website, USSC.gov. The homepage was replaced by an embedded YouTube video, Anonymous Operation Last Resort. The video statement said Swartz "faced an impossible choice". A hacker downloaded "hundreds of thousands" of scientific-journal articles from a Swiss publisher's website and republished them on the open Web in Swartz's honor a week before the first anniversary of his death.

==== White House petition ====
After Swartz's death, more than 50,000 people signed an online petition to the White House calling for Ortiz's removal "for overreach in the case of Aaron Swartz". A similar petition was submitted calling for prosecutor Stephen Heymann's firing. In January 2015, the White House declined both petitions.

=== Commemorations ===
Swartz's father Robert accepting his son's induction into the Internet Hall of Fame, 2013

On August 3, 2013, Swartz was posthumously inducted into the Internet Hall of Fame. A hackathon was held in Swartz's memory around the date of his birthday in 2013. On the weekend of November 8–10, 2013, inspired by Swartz's work and life, a second annual hackathon was held in at least 16 cities around the world. Preliminary topics worked on at the 2013 Aaron Swartz Hackathon were privacy and software tools, transparency, activism, access, legal fixes, and a low-cost book scanner. In January 2014, Lawrence Lessig led a walk across New Hampshire in honor of Swartz, rallying for campaign finance reform. In 2017, the Turkish-Dutch artist Ahmet Öğüt commemorated Swartz in a work titled "Information Power to The People", which depicted his bust.

== Legacy ==
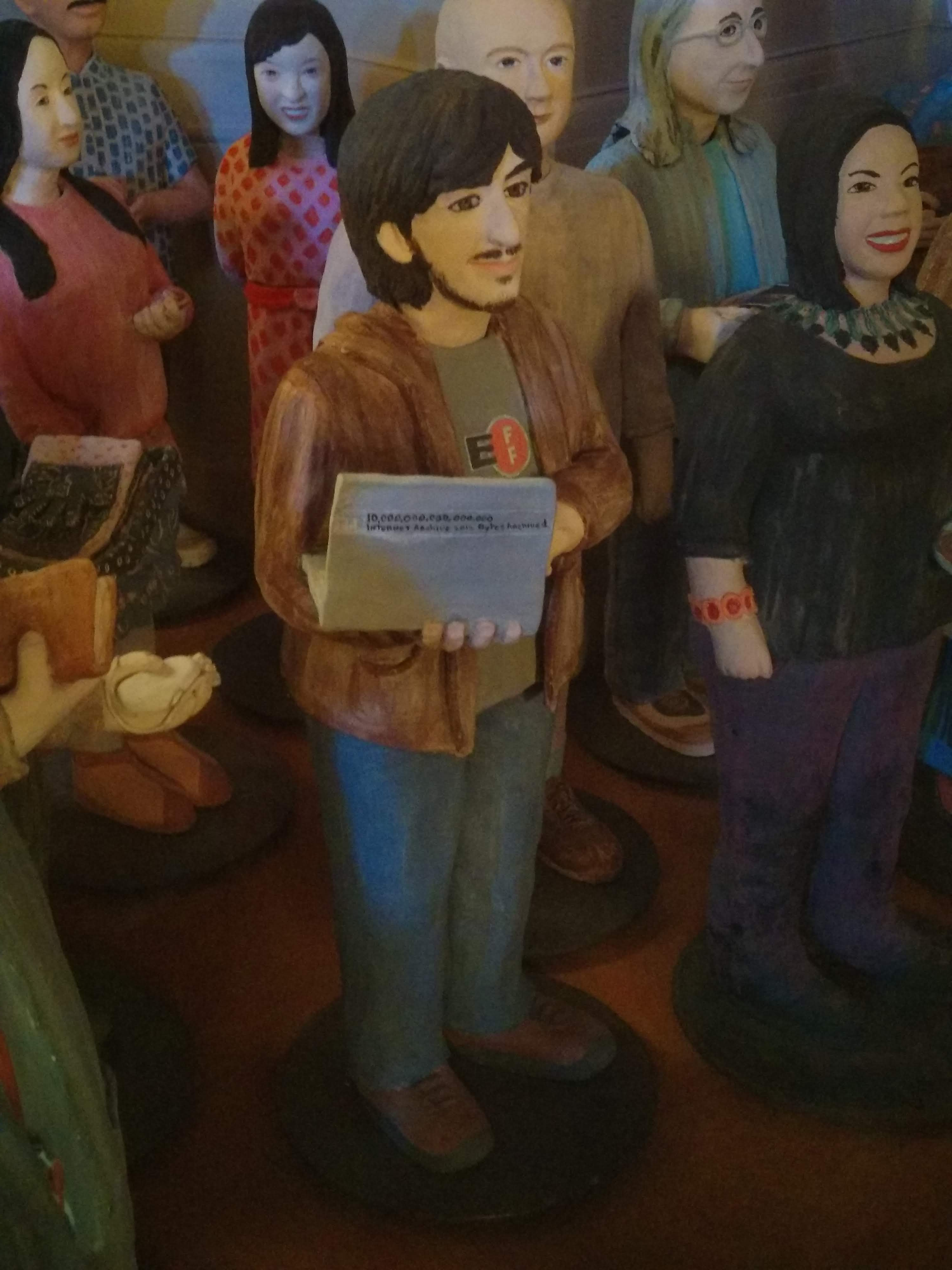
A clay statue of Aaron Swartz at the Internet Archive

=== Open Access ===
A long-time supporter of open access, Swartz wrote in his Guerilla Open Access Manifesto:

The world's entire scientific ... heritage ... is increasingly being digitized and locked up by a handful of private corporations....

The Open Access Movement has fought valiantly to ensure that scientists do not sign their copyrights away but instead ensure their work is published on the Internet, under terms that allow anyone to access it.

Swartz's supporters responded to news of his death with an effort called #PDFTribute to promote Open Access. On January 12, Eva Vivalt, a development economist at the World Bank, began posting her academic articles online using the hashtag #pdftribute as a tribute to Swartz. Scholars posted links to their works. Swartz's story has exposed the topic of open access to scientific publications to wider audiences.

Many institutions and personalities have since campaigned for open access to scientific knowledge. Swartz's death prompted calls for more open access to scholarly data (e.g., open science data). The Think Computer Foundation and the Center for Information Technology Policy (CITP) at Princeton University announced scholarships awarded in memory of Swartz. In 2013, Swartz was posthumously awarded the American Library Association's James Madison Award for being an "outspoken advocate for public participation in government and unrestricted access to peer-reviewed scholarly articles". In March, the editor and editorial board of the Journal of Library Administration resigned en masse, citing a dispute with the journal's publisher, Routledge. One board member wrote of a "crisis of conscience about publishing in a journal that was not open access" after Swartz died. In 2002, Swartz had said that when he died, he wanted the contents of his hard drives made publicly available.

=== Congress ===
Three members of the U.S. House of Representatives—Republican Darrell Issa and Democrats Zoe Lofgren and Jared Polis—all on the House Judiciary Committee, raised questions about the government's handling of the case. Calling the charges against him "ridiculous and trumped up", Polis called Swartz a "martyr" whose death illustrated the need for Congress to limit the discretion of federal prosecutors. At a memorial for Swartz on Capitol Hill, Issa said:

Ultimately, knowledge belongs to all the people of the world. ... Aaron understood that. ... Our copyright laws were created for the purpose of promoting useful works, not hiding them.

Senator Elizabeth Warren issued a statement saying that Swartz's "advocacy for Internet freedom, social justice, and Wall Street reform demonstrated ... the power of his ideas". In a letter to Attorney General Eric Holder, Senator John Cornyn asked, "On what basis did the U.S. Attorney for the District of Massachusetts conclude that her office's conduct was 'appropriate'?" and "Was the prosecution of Mr. Swartz in any way retaliation for his exercise of his rights as a citizen under the Freedom of Information Act?"

==== Congressional investigations ====
Issa, who chaired the House Committee on Oversight and Government Reform, announced that he would investigate the Justice Department's actions in prosecuting Swartz. In a statement to The Huffington Post, he praised Swartz's work on "open government and free access to the people". Issa's investigation garnered some bipartisan support. On January 28, 2013, Issa and ranking committee member Elijah Cummings published a letter to Holder asking why federal prosecutors had filed the superseding indictment. On February 20, WBUR reported that Ortiz was expected to testify at an upcoming Oversight Committee hearing about her office's handling of Swartz's case. On February 22, Associate Deputy Attorney General Steven Reich conducted a briefing for congressional staffers involved in the investigation. They were told that Swartz's Guerilla Open Access Manifesto played a role in prosecutorial decision-making. Congressional staffers left this briefing believing that prosecutors thought Swartz had to be convicted of a felony carrying at least a short prison sentence in order to justify having filed charges against him.

Excoriating the Department of Justice as the "Department of Vengeance", Stinebrickner-Kauffman told the Guardian that the DOJ had erred in relying on Swartz's Guerilla Open Access Manifesto as an indication of his beliefs by 2010. She said, "He was no longer a single issue activist. He was into lots of things, from healthcare to climate change to money in politics." On March 6, Holder testified before the Senate Judiciary Committee that the case was "a good use of prosecutorial discretion". In response, Stinebrickner-Kauffman issued a statement repeating and amplifying her claims of prosecutorial misconduct. Public documents, she wrote, reveal that Heymann "instructed the Secret Service to seize and hold evidence without a warrant... lied to the judge about that fact in written briefs... [and] withheld exculpatory evidence... for over a year", violating his legal and ethical obligations to turn such evidence over to the defense. On March 22, Senator Al Franken wrote in a letter to Holder that "charging a young man like Mr. Swartz with federal offenses punishable by over 35 years of federal imprisonment seems remarkably aggressive—particularly when it appears that one of the principal aggrieved parties ... did not support a criminal prosecution."

==== Amendment to Computer Fraud and Abuse Act ====
In 2013, Lofgren introduced a bill, Aaron's Law (H.R. 2454, S. 1196), to exclude terms of service violations from the 1986 Computer Fraud and Abuse Act and from the wire fraud statute. Lessig wrote of the bill, "this is a critically important change.... The CFAA was the hook for the government's bullying.... This law would remove that hook. In a single line: no longer would it be a felony to breach a contract." Professor Orin Kerr, a specialist in the nexus between computer law and criminal law, wrote that he had been arguing for precisely this sort of reform of the Act for years. The ACLU also called for reform of the CFAA to "remove the dangerously broad criminalization of online activity". The EFF mounted a campaign for these reforms. Lessig's inaugural Chair lecture as Furman Professor of Law and Leadership was titled Aaron's Laws: Law and Justice in a Digital Age; he dedicated the lecture to Swartz. The Aaron's Law bill stalled in committee. Brian Knappenberger alleges this was due to Oracle Corporation's financial interest in maintaining the status quo.

==== Fair Access to Science and Technology Research Act ====
The Fair Access to Science and Technology Research Act (FASTR) is a bill that would mandate earlier public release of taxpayer-funded research. FASTR has been described as "The Other Aaron's Law". Senators Wyden and Cornyn introduced the Senate version in 2013, 2015 and 2017, while the bill was introduced to the House of Representatives by Lofgren, Mike Doyle, and Kevin Yoder. Wyden wrote of the bill, "the FASTR act provides that access to taxpayer funded research should never be hidden behind a paywall." The legislation did not pass, but it prompted more open access on the part of the US government. Shortly after the bill's introduction in 2013, the Office of Science and Technology Policy directed "each Federal agency with over $100 million in annual conduct of research and development expenditures to develop a plan to support increased public access to the results of research funded by the Federal Government".

==== Aaron Swartz Day ====
Since 2013, Aaron Swartz Day has been celebrated on his birthday, November 8, with hackathons and livestreamed talks related to the many issues Swartz was passionate about, such as open access and progressive politics and economics. Past speakers include Chelsea Manning, Barrett Brown, Trevor Timm of the Freedom of the Press Foundation, Cory Doctorow, Cindy Cohn, Jason Leopold, and Brewster Kahle.

== Media ==
Swartz has been featured in various works of art and has posthumously received dedications from numerous artists. He appeared in a few documentaries, including Aardvark'd: 12 Weeks with Geeks in 2005. After leaving Reddit, he appeared in Steal This Film II (2007). Swartz's first posthumous work was in 2013, when Kenneth Goldsmith dedicated his "Printing out the Internet" exhibition to Swartz. There are also biographical films about Swartz:

=== The Internet's Own Boy: The Story of Aaron Swartz ===
On January 11, 2014, marking the first anniversary of his death, a preview was released of The Internet's Own Boy: The Story of Aaron Swartz, a documentary about Swartz, the NSA and SOPA. The film was officially released at the January 2014 Sundance Film Festival. Democracy Now! covered the release of the documentary, as well as Swartz's life and legal case, in a sprawling interview with director Brian Knappenberger, Swartz's father, brother, and his attorney. The documentary is released under a Creative Commons License; it debuted in theaters and on-demand in June 2014.

Mashable called the documentary "a powerful homage to Aaron Swartz". Its debut at Sundance received a standing ovation. Mashable wrote, "With the help of experts, The Internet's Own Boy makes a clear argument: Swartz unjustly became a victim of the rights and freedoms for which he stood." The Hollywood Reporter called it a "heartbreaking" story of a "tech wunderkind persecuted by the U.S. government" and a must-see "for anyone who knows enough to care about the way laws govern information transfer in the digital age".

=== Killswitch ===
In October 2014, Killswitch, a documentary film featuring Swartz, Lessig, Tim Wu, and Edward Snowden, premiered at the Woodstock Film Festival, where it won the award for Best Editing. The film focuses on Swartz's role in advocating for internet freedoms. In February 2015, Congressman Alan Grayson invited Killswitch to screen at the Capitol Visitor Center in Washington, D.C. The event was held on the eve of the Federal Communications Commission's historic decision on net neutrality. At the event, Grayson, Lessig, and Free Press CEO Craig Aaron spoke about Swartz and his fight for a free and open Internet.

Grayson called Killswitch "one of the most honest accounts of the battle to control the Internet—and access to information itself." Richard von Busack of the Metro Silicon Valley said Killswitch contains "some of the most lapidary use of found footage this side of The Atomic Café". Fred Swegles of the Orange County Register wrote, "Anyone who values unfettered access to online information is apt to be captivated by Killswitch, a gripping and fast-paced documentary." Kathy Gill of GeekWire wrote, "Killswitch is much more than a dry recitation of technical history. Director Ali Akbarzadeh, producer Jeff Horn, and writer Chris Dollar created a human-centered story. A large part of that connection comes from Lessig and his relationship with Swartz."

=== Other films ===
He appeared in the unreleased film War for the Web where he had been interviewed a year prior to his death. The documentary was ultimately cancelled as it failed to reach its funding goal, but the footage was later used in The Internet's Own Boy. Another biographical film about Swartz, Think Aaron, was being developed by HBO Films as of 2020.

== Works ==
=== Specifications ===
- Markdown: Swartz contributed to Markdown – a lightweight markup language for generating HTML – and was the author of its html2text translator. The syntax for Markdown was influenced by Swartz's earlier atx language (2002), which today is primarily remembered for its syntax for specifying headers, known as atx-style headers: Markdown itself remains in widespread use, with websites including Reddit, GitHub and Discord using it, as well as LLMs such as Claude using it to format the files that store accumulated memories.
- RDF/XML at W3C: In 2001, Swartz joined the RDFCore working group at the World Wide Web Consortium (W3C), where he authored RFC 3870, Application/RDF+XML Media Type Registration. The document described a new media type, "RDF/XML", designed to support the Semantic Web.

=== Software ===
- DeadDrop: In 2011–2012, Swartz, Kevin Poulsen, and James Dolan designed and implemented DeadDrop, a system that allows anonymous informants to send electronic documents without fear of disclosure. In May 2013, the first instance of the software was launched by The New Yorker under the name Strongbox. The Freedom of the Press Foundation has since taken over development of the software, which has been renamed SecureDrop.
- Tor2web: In 2008, Swartz worked with Virgil Griffith to design and implement Tor2web, an HTTP proxy for Tor-hidden services. The proxy was designed to provide easy access to Tor from a basic web browser. The software is now maintained by Giovanni Pellerano within the GlobaLeaks project.

=== Publications ===
- Swartz, Aaron; Hendler, James (October 2001). "The Semantic Web: A network of content for the digital city". Proceedings of the Second Annual Digital Cities Workshop. Kyoto, JP: Blogspace.
- Swartz, Aaron (January–February 2002). "MusicBrainz: A Semantic Web service" (PDF). IEEE Intelligent Systems. 17 (1): 76–77. Bibcode:2002IISys..17a..76S. doi:10.1109/5254.988466. ISSN 1541-1672.
- Gruber, John; Swartz, Aaron (December 2004). "Markdown definition". Daring Fireball. Archived from the original on April 2, 2004.
- Swartz, Aaron (July 2008). "Guerilla Open Access Manifesto".
- Swartz, Aaron; Hendler, James (2009). Building programmable Web sites. S.F.: Morgan & Claypool. ISBN 978-1-59829-920-5.
- Swartz, Aaron (Interviewee). We can change the world (Video). Archived from the original on December 21, 2021 – via YouTube.
- Swartz, Aaron (Speaker) (May 21, 2012). Keynote address at Freedom To Connect 2012: How we stopped SOPA (Video). D.C. Archived from the original on December 21, 2021 – via YouTube.
- Swartz, Aaron (February 2013) [2009]. "Aaron Swartz's A Programmable Web: An Unfinished Work" . Synthesis Lectures on the Semantic Web: Theory and Technology ( PDF). 3 (2). Morgan & Claypool Publishers: 1–64. doi:10.2200/S00481ED1V01Y201302WBE005 (inactive July 1, 2025). S2CID 42502385. "To Dan Connolly, who not only created the Web but found time to teach it to me."
- Swartz, Aaron; Lucchese, Adriano (November 2014). "Raw Thought, Raw Nerve: Inside the Mind of Aaron Swartz" ( PDF/ePub). New York City: Discovery Publisher.
- Swartz, Aaron (January 2016). The Boy Who Could Change the World: The Writings of Aaron Swartz. The New Press. OL 25886237M. Archived from the original on February 12, 2022.

== See also ==
- Alexandra Elbakyan
- List of Wikipedia people
- Sci-Hub
- Shadow library
- Z-Library
