= Access2Research =

Campaign for academic journal publishing reform

A video by SPARC in support of the campaign.

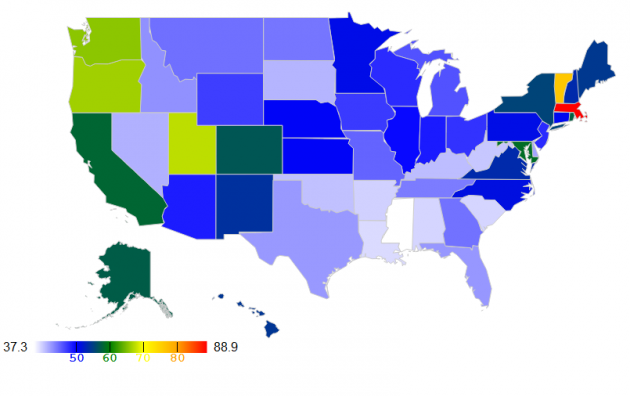
A normalized heatmap of per-capita signatures to the petition by U.S. state. Highest support from Massachusetts (red), lowest from Mississippi (white).

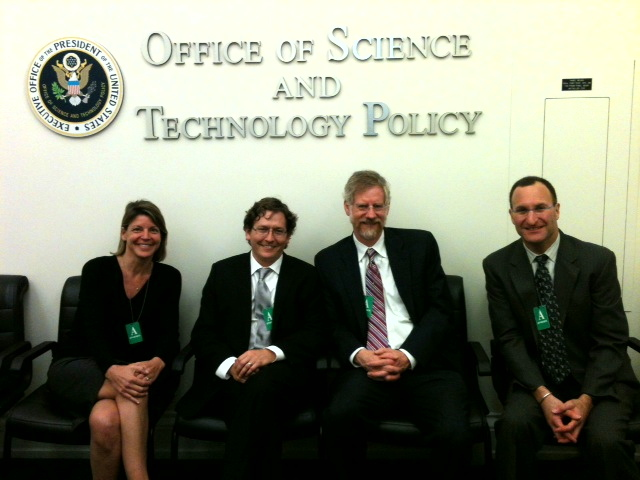
The Access2Research Founders, Heather Joseph, John Wilbanks, Michael W. Carroll and Mike Rossner after meeting at the White House Office of Science and Technology Policy.

Access2Research is an advocacy campaign for an open-access mandate for all United States federally-funded research led by Michael W. Carroll, Heather Joseph, Mike Rossner, and John Wilbanks.

On May 20, 2012, it launched a petition to the White House to "require free access over the Internet to journal articles arising from taxpayer-funded research". The White House has committed to issue an official response to such petitions if they reach 25,000 signatures within 30 days. Access2Research reached this milestone within two weeks. On February 22, 2013, the White House Office of Science and Technology Policy and announced an executive directive ordering all US Federal Agencies with research & development budgets over $100M to develop public access policies within twelve months.

The petition builds on previous campaigns asking scholars, publishers, funders, governments and the general public to remove paywalls to publicly funded scholarly research. It follows initiatives previously targeted at academics such as The Cost of Knowledge calling for lower prices for scholarly journals and to promote increased access to scientific information. The campaign refers to the NIH Public Access Policy as an example of a mandate that should be expanded to all federally funded research.

== Endorsements ==
The campaign's outreach was supported on the first day of its launch by Creative Commons, the Public Library of Science, the Scholarly Publishing and Academic Resources Coalition, RockHealth, Sage Bionetworks, The Cost of Knowledge, the Harvard Open Access Project, the Open Knowledge Foundation, the Open Science Federation, PatientsLikeMe and Lybba.

It has been publicly endorsed by several other organizations, including the Alliance for Taxpayer Access, the Association of College and Research Libraries, the Association of Research Libraries, Arizona State University Libraries, BioSharing, The Center for Scholarly Communication and Digital Curation at Northwestern University, figshare, Genetic Alliance, InTechWeb, Mendeley and the Wikimedia Foundation.

== Criticism ==
The petition has been criticized by a spokesperson for the Association of American Publishers who said they "oppose government mandates on research publications", whereas Public Library of Science co-founder Michael Eisen referred to the petition as a "compromise" that does not go far enough, pointing out that the NIH policy allows for delayed open access.

== See also ==
- Academic journal publishing reform
- Access to knowledge movement
- Fair Copyright in Research Works Act
- Federal Research Public Access Act
- Research Works Act
- Academic Spring
