= Research Works Act =

Proposed US legislation

- Long title: "To ensure the continued publication and integrity of peer-reviewed research works by the private sector." —H.R. 3699

Legislative history
- Introduced in the House as H.R. 3699 by Darrell Issa (R-CA) on December 16, 2011; Committee consideration by United States House Committee on Oversight and Government Reform

The Research Works Act, 102 H.R. 3699, was a bill that was introduced in the United States House of Representatives at the 112th United States Congress on December 16, 2011, by Representative Darrell Issa (R-CA) and co-sponsored by Carolyn B. Maloney (D-NY). The bill contained provisions to prohibit open-access mandates for federally funded research and effectively revert the United States' National Institutes of Health Public Access Policy, which requires taxpayer-funded research to be freely accessible online. If enacted, it would have also severely restricted the sharing of scientific data. The bill was referred to the House Committee on Oversight and Government Reform, of which Issa is the chair. Similar bills were introduced in 2008 and 2009 but have not been enacted since.

On February 27, 2012, Elsevier, a major publisher, announced that it was withdrawing support for the Act. Later that day, Issa and Maloney issued a statement saying that they would not push for legislative action on the bill.

== Reception ==
The bill was supported by the Association of American Publishers (AAP) and the Copyright Alliance.

The Scholarly Publishing and Academic Resources Coalition, the Alliance for Taxpayer Access, the American Library Association, the International Society for Computational Biology, the Confederation of Open Access Repositories and prominent open science and open access advocates criticized the Research Works Act, some of them urging scholarly societies to resign from the AAP because of its support for the bill. Several AAP members, including MIT Press, Rockefeller University Press, Nature Publishing Group, American Association for the Advancement of Science stated their opposition to the bill but signaled no intention to leave the association. Other AAP members stated their opposition to the bill as did the Association of American Universities (AAU) and the Association of Public and Land-grant Universities. Several public health groups opposed the bill.

Opponents stressed particularly the effects on public availability of biomedical research results, such as those funded by NIH grants, submitting that under the bill "taxpayers who already paid for the research would have to pay again to read the results". Mike Taylor from the University of Bristol said that the bill's denial of access to scientific research would cause "preventable deaths in developing countries" and "an incalculable loss to science", and said Representatives Issa and Maloney were motivated by multiple donations they had received from the academic publisher Elsevier.

An online petition – The Cost of Knowledge – inspired by British mathematician and Fields medalist Timothy Gowers to raise awareness of the bill, to call for lower prices for journals and to promote increased open access to information, was signed by more than 10,000 scholars. Signatories vowed to withhold their support from Elsevier journals as editors, reviewers or authors "unless they radically change how they operate". On February 27, 2012, Elsevier announced its withdrawal of support for the bill, citing concerns from journal authors, editors, and reviewers. While participants in the boycott celebrated the dropping of support for the Research Works Act, Elsevier denied that their action was a result of the boycott and stated that they took this action at the request of those researchers who did not participate in the boycott.

== Related legislation and executive action ==
The Research Works Act followed other attempts to challenge institutional open-access mandates in the US. On September 9, 2008, an earlier bill aimed at reversing the NIH's Public Access Policy – the Fair Copyright in Research Works Act, or Conyers Bill – was introduced as 110 H. R. 6845 in the House of Representatives at the 110th United States Congress by U.S Representative John Conyers (D-MI), with three cosponsors. It was referred to the House Committee on the Judiciary, to which Conyers delivered an introduction on September 10, 2008. After the start of the 111th United States Congress, Conyers and six-cosponsors reintroduced the bill to the House of Representatives as 111 H. R. 801 on February 3, 2009. It was on the same day referred to the House Committee on the Judiciary and on March 16 to the Subcommittee on Courts and Competition Policy.

On the other hand, the Federal Research Public Access Act proposed to expand the open public access mandate to research funded by eleven U.S. federal agencies. Originally introduced to the Senate in 2006 by John Cornyn (R-TX) with two cosponsors, it was reintroduced in 2009 by Lieberman, co-sponsored by Cornyn, and again in 2012. These bills proposed requiring that those eleven agencies with research expenditures over $100 million create online repositories of journal articles of the research completed by that agency and make them publicly available without charge within six months after it has been published in a peer-reviewed journal. On February 22, 2013 the Obama administration issued a similar policy memorandum, directing Federal agencies with more than $100 million in annual research and development expenditures to develop plans to make research freely available to the public within one year of publication in most cases.

== Later developments ==
The controversy about Research Works Act finally ended on August 25, 2022, when the US Office of Science and Technology Policy under Biden's administration issued a contractual mandate to make all publications reporting studies funded by the U.S. federal government freely available without delay, thus ending over 50 years of the serials crisis, albeit only for U.S. contributions.

== See also ==
- PubMed Central
- Open-access journal
