= Heather Joseph =

American open access activist

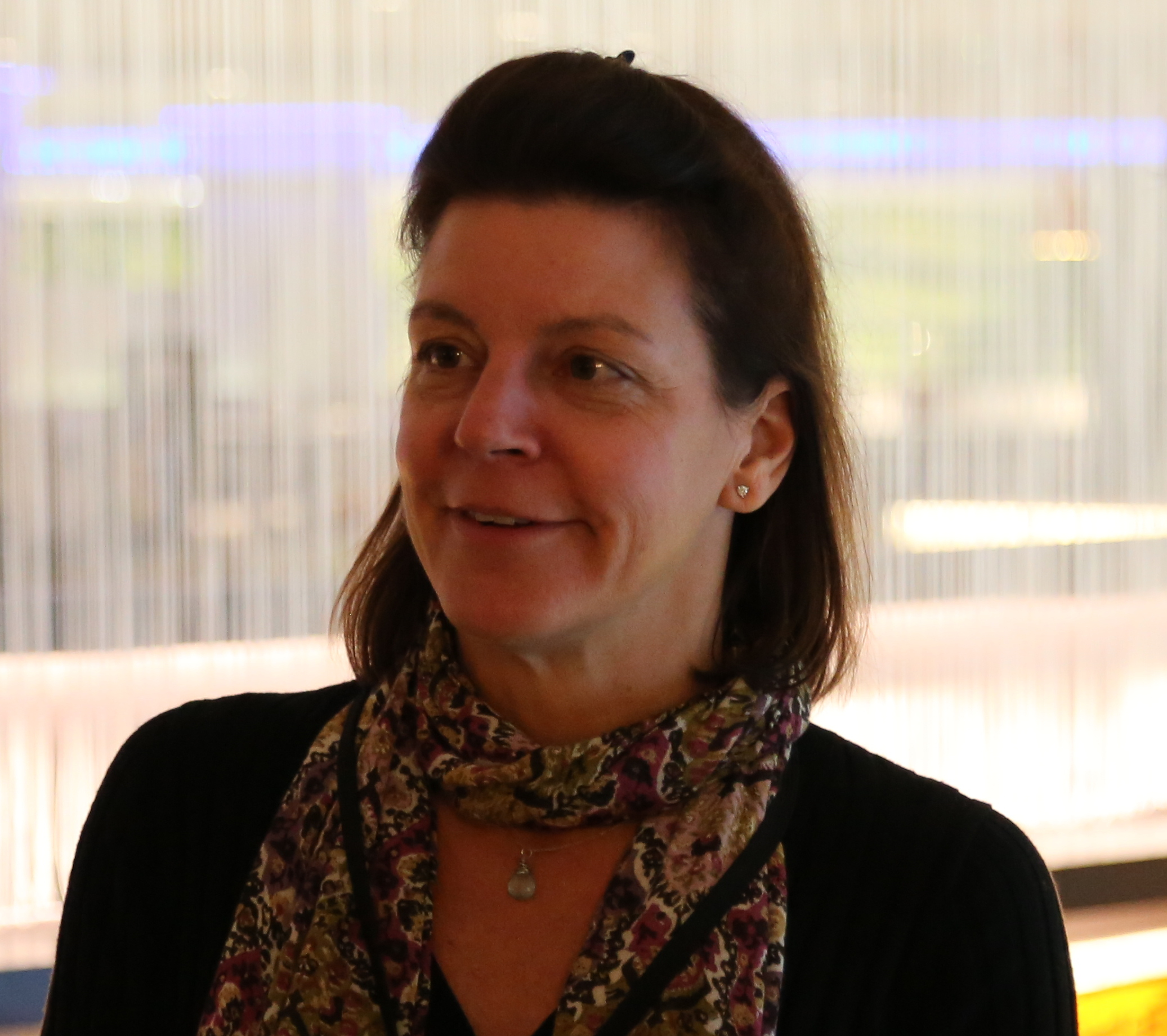
- Joseph attending OpenCon 2015
- Occupation: Open access activists

Heather Joseph is a United States–based advocate for open access and particularly academic journal publishing reform. She is the executive director of the Scholarly Publishing and Academic Resources Coalition (SPARC) and a member of the PLOS Board of Directors.

== Background ==
In the late 1990s, Joseph was the editor of Molecular Biology of the Cell. In August 2000, Joseph was appointed president and COO of BioOne. In this role, Joseph led the non-profit start-up enterprise's business, operational, administrative, and strategic development.

== Projects ==
Joseph encourages scientists to encourage their publications to get the broadest readership possible by discussing publishing options with research institutions, scientific societies, and the government.

She advocates for the passing of the Federal Research Public Access Act.

She is one of the organizers of Access2Research.

In December 2020, the National Information Standards Organization (NISO) recognized her accomplishments "as a leader in the open access movement" by selecting Joseph for the 2021 Miles Conrad Award.
