= Mike Rossner =

American activist

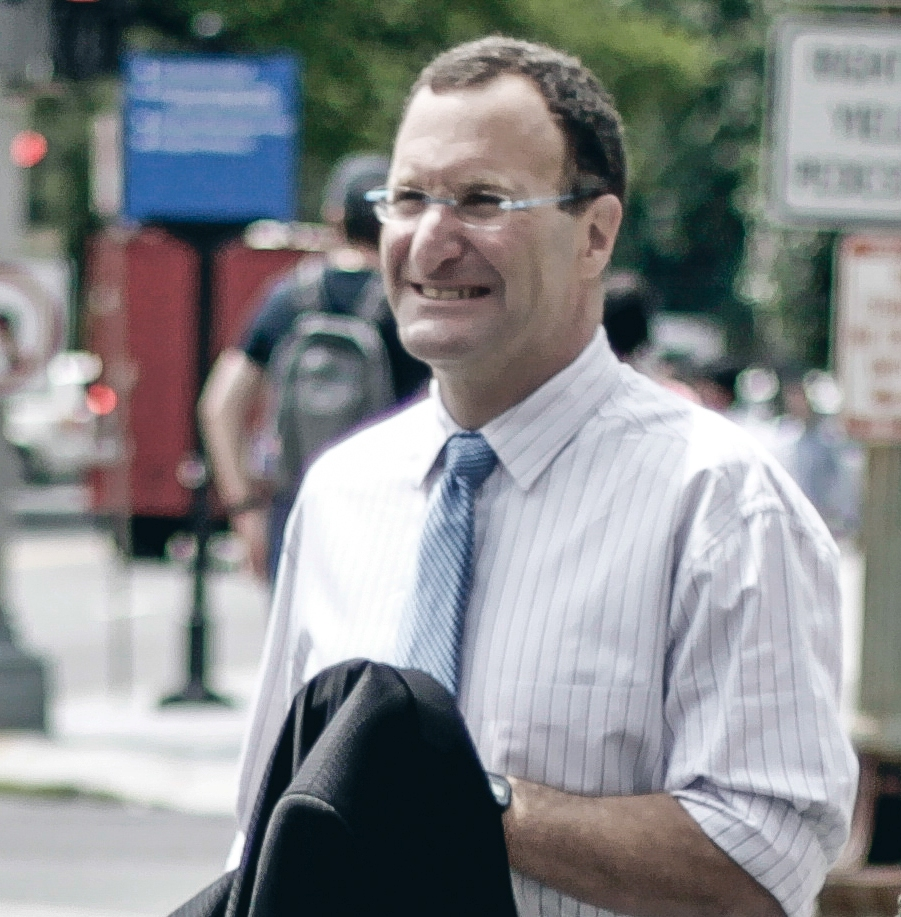
- Photo of Rossner at a June 2013 White House event
- Known for: Advocacy for open-access scholarly publishing

Mike Rossner is a United States-based advocate for academic journal publishing reform and open access. He was the director of the Rockefeller University Press from December 2006 to May 2013.

== Background ==
In 1997, Rossner became editor of the Journal of Cell Biology. On 1 December 2006, he became director of The Rockefeller University Press and became interim editor of the Journal of Cell Biology until his replacement was hired.

In July 2009, Rossner was awarded as a SPARC Innovator by the Scholarly Publishing and Academic Resources Coalition.

== Projects ==
Rossner is one of the organizers of Access2Research.

He is a supporter of open-access mandates.
