= Bach v Longman =

1777 British copyright case

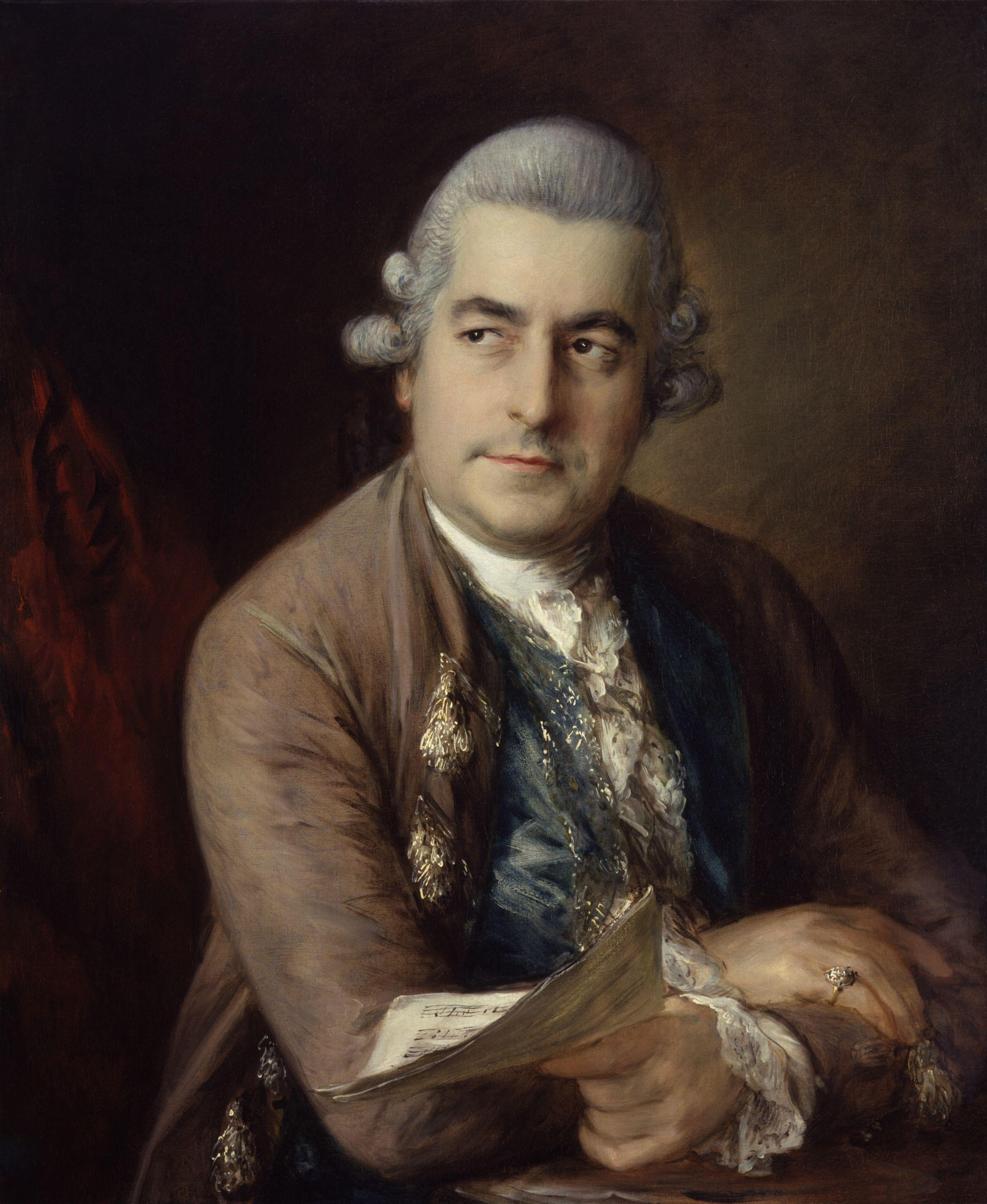
Johann Christian Bach, painted in London by Thomas Gainsborough, 1776

Bach v Longman (1777) 2 Cowp 623 is an English copyright case in which the Court of King's Bench held that printed music was protected by the 1710 Statute of Anne. The composer Johann Christian Bach sued the London music sellers James Longman and Charles Lukey for publishing two of his harpsichord sonatas without his consent. William Murray, Lord Mansfield's court certified that "a musical composition is a writing" and that the Statute of Anne was an applicable act. The decision became the basis of musical copyright in Britain from 1777 until the Copyright Act 1842.

== Background ==
The 1710 Statute of Anne gave the author of "any book" the sole right to print it for fourteen years, renewable for a further fourteen if the author was still living. Its preamble spoke of "books and other writings", but the Act did not define a book. The music trade did not consider it to cover printed music at the time. Music publishers saw little need for statutory protection. Most music went out of fashion long before a 14- or 28-year term would have run out, so protecting their own titles mattered little, while reprinting other publishers' music without permission was common and profitable. Before 1780 music rarely made up more than 2 per cent of the registrations at Stationers' Hall. Bills in 1735 and 1737 that would have extended the Act expressly to music both failed, and the only other copyright statute, the Engraving Copyright Act 1734/1735, covered only engravings.

Composers who wanted government protection of their works instead petitioned the Crown for a royal privilege; at least sixteen were granted to composers between 1710 and 1770. Carl Friedrich Abel, a renowned player of the viola da gamba, came to London in 1759 and became chamber musician to Queen Charlotte. Johann Christian Bach, the youngest son of famous composer Johann Sebastian Bach, arrived in 1762 and became the Queen's music master. Abel received a privilege in 1760, and Bach a fourteen-year privilege for his music in December 1763. The two jointly directed an annual concert series, and they became leaders in the London music community.

James Longman became a music seller in around 1767, with Charles Lukey as his partner from about 1769. Longman was involved in at least thirty lawsuits over his career, and had been in dispute with Abel in 1769.

== Case ==
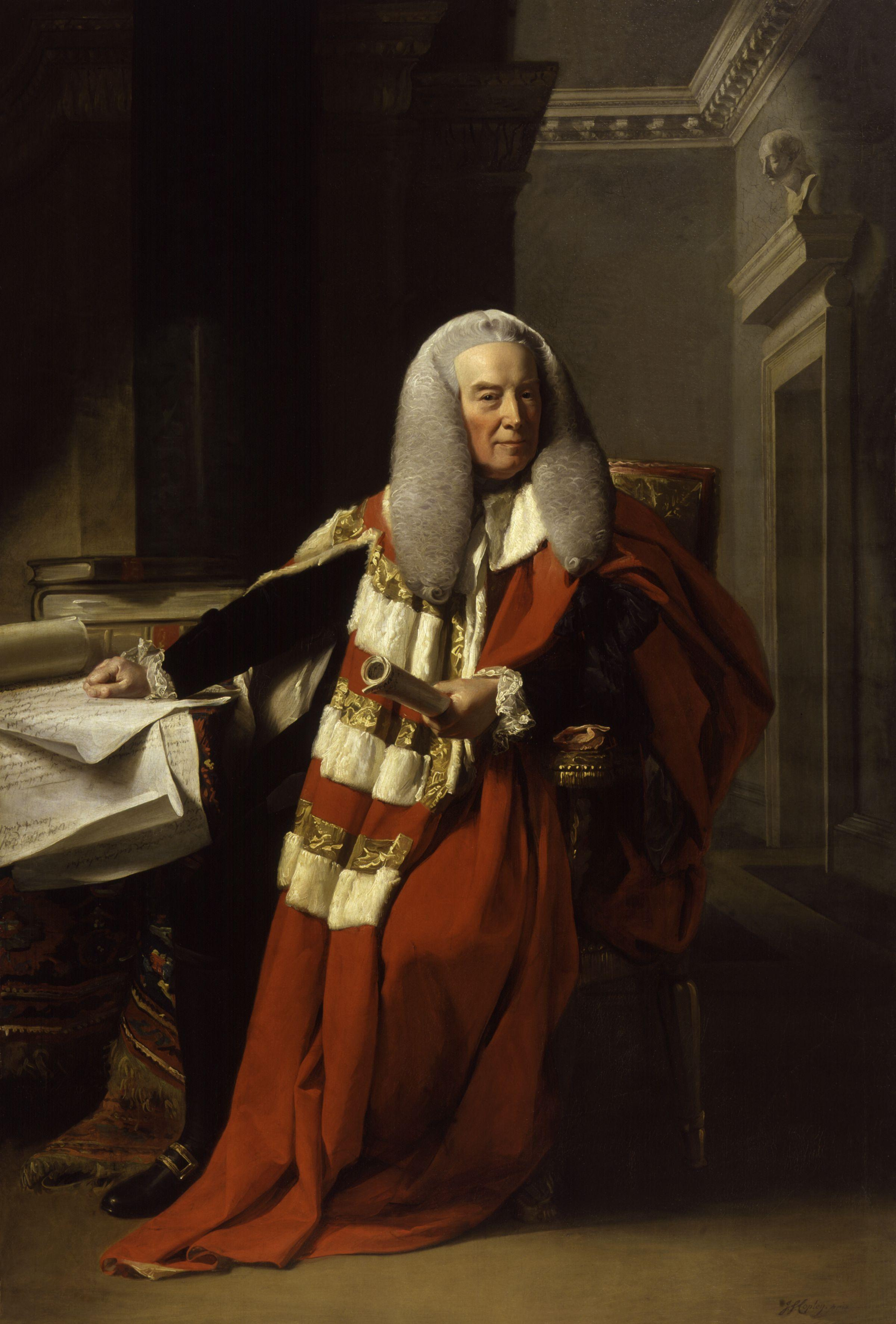
Lord Mansfield, the judge who ruled in Bach's favour, portrait by John Singleton Copley, 1783

On 18 March 1773 Bach's barrister, Charles Robinson, lodged a bill in the Court of Chancery against "Longman Lukey & Co. of Cheapside". It complained that they had "by undue means obtained Copies" of two of Bach's harpsichord sonatas and an accompaniment for viola da gamba, and sold the works "for a very large profit". Bach sued alone, by agreement with Abel, because his privilege had longer to run; Abel's expired in 1774. The Lord Chancellor, Henry Bathurst, Lord Apsley, granted an injunction five days later. Bach did not consider the injunction sufficient, and pressed for a formal legal reply, perhaps expecting an offer of settlement. Instead, Longman and Lukey contested the case, and by repeatedly asking for more time, delayed the hearing for three years.

Bach's legal position weakened during the intervening years. In February 1774 the House of Lords held in Donaldson v Becket that the Statute of Anne had extinguished any common-law copyright in published books. A later decision, Stationers' Company v Carnan, held that an almanac monopoly granted by royal privilege was invalid and that the Crown had no power to grant such exclusive privileges, a holding that set Bach's privilege on dubious legal grounds. On 15 March 1774, Bach and Abel joined the London booksellers in petitioning the House of Commons. They asked it to settle "a Doubt ... whether the sole Right granted by the said Act, to the Author of any Book or Books, extends to the Author of any Book, Writing or Composition in Music". The petition came to nothing and was ignored.

When the case came before the Lord Chancellor in May 1776, Bach's counsel argued that music was a form of writing within the Statute of Anne. The Lord Chancellor referred that question to the Court of King's Bench. Lord Mansfield heard it on 10 June 1777, with Robinson representing Bach and George Wood representing the defendants. Mansfield called on Wood and, without hearing Robinson in reply, said that the case was so clear "that it was difficult to speak seriously upon it". The Act's words, "books and other writings", were "very large" and not "confined to language or letters": "Music is a science; it may be written; and the mode of conveying the ideas, is by signs and marks." On 16 June the court wrote in its opinion:

Having heard counsel and considered this case, we are of opinion, that a musical composition is a writing within the statute of the 8th of Queen Anne, intitled an act for the encouragement of learning, by vesting the copies of printed books in the authors or purchasers of such copies, during the times therein mentioned.

The phrase "books and other writings" appears only in the Statute's preamble; its operative sections speak only of a "book". Rather than hold that music was a book, Mansfield in effect read the preamble into the operative language and treated music as one of the "other writings". On 8 July 1777 the Lord Chancellor made the injunction perpetual and ordered Longman to open his books so that damages could be assessed. No later record of the case survives. The parties apparently settled; in 1779 Longman published two songs that Bach had written for Vauxhall Gardens.

== Aftermath ==
The decision brought published music within the statutory regime. According to Michael W. Carroll, it "regularized the means for obtaining and enforcing rights", which were now set to a standard term defined in the statute, rather than the ad hoc durations of royal printing privileges. Registration at Stationers' Hall was not strictly needed to secure copyright, but publishers came to see it as a benefit. Music registrations rose from 35 in the 1770s to 738 in the 1780s and 1,828 in the 1790s, and music came to make up a quarter of annual registrations. Publishers who had resisted composers' claims now used copyright themselves: Longman & Lukey soon began suing rival publishers under the Statute of Anne, and more than forty music copyright cases were reported during the 19th century. Bach v Longman remained the basis of British musical copyright until the Copyright Act 1842 brought music expressly within copyright law. It also set a precedent for reading the Statute of Anne broadly as applying to anything that could be considered a book or form of writing. The case also established that a foreigner resident in Britain could hold copyright there, a point that attracted little attention at the time.

The case did little for Bach himself. The concert series became a financial burden, Carl Friedrich Abel withdrew from the partnership, and Bach died in debt in 1782. Bach was ultimately forgotten as a musician. The economist Frederic M. Scherer found no evidence that musical copyright increased the number of people becoming composers in Britain. Scherer allowed that copyright helped some composers prosper, but argued that it was "by no means the only operative stimulus". Many, if not most, composers of the period made a comfortable living from employment, teaching, and other work. Those who lived in countries with weak or ineffective copyright protection produced more than half of the period's music.

== See also ==
- Music piracy

== Bibliography ==
- Carroll, Michael W. (September 2005). "The Struggle for Music Copyright". Florida Law Review. 57 (4): 907–961.
- Hunter, David (July 1986). "Music Copyright in Britain to 1800". Music & Letters. 67 (3): 269–282. JSTOR 735889.
