= Environmental Health Perspectives =

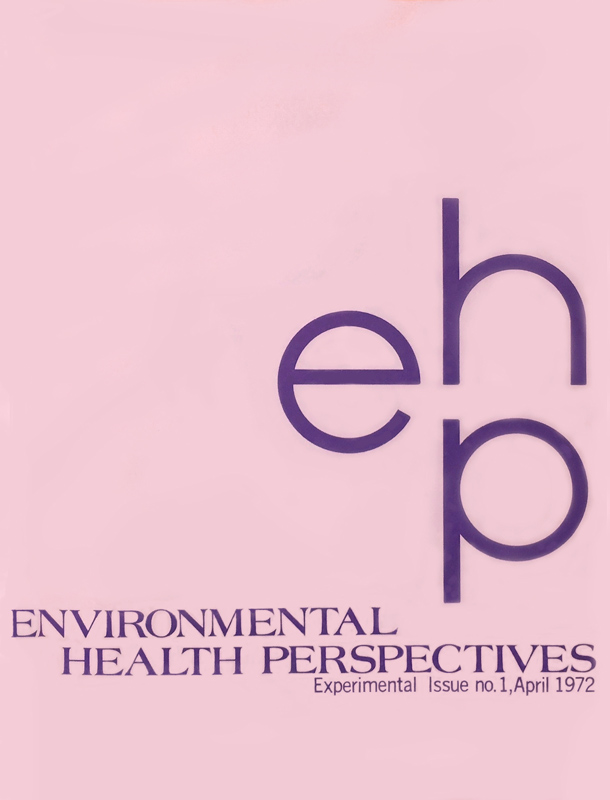
- Discipline: Environmental health
- Language: English
- Edited by: Joel D. Kaufman, MD, MPH

Publication details
- History: 1972–present
- Publisher: American Chemical Society (United States)
- Frequency: Monthly
- Open access: Yes
- License: Public domain
- Impact factor: 10.1 (2023)

Standard abbreviations
- ISO 4: Environ. Health Perspect.

Indexing
- CODEN: EVHPAZ
- ISSN: 0091-6765 (print); 1552-9924 (web)
- LCCN: 76642723
- OCLC no.: 01727134

Links
- Journal homepage; Online archive; PubMed Central; JSTOR; Manuscript submission

Environmental Health Perspectives (EHP) is a peer-reviewed open access journal published from April 1972 until June 2025 by the U.S. National Institute of Environmental Health Sciences (NIEHS). The primary purposes of EHP are to communicate recent scientific findings and trends in the environmental health sciences; to improve the environmental health knowledge base among researchers, administrators, and policy makers; and to inform the public about important topics in environmental health. The journal has been indexed in Medline / Index Medicus since 1972. According to the Journal Citations Reports, the impact factor of Environmental Health Perspectives was 10.1 in 2024.

From 2001 to 2021 the journal published a Chinese edition, with selected articles translated into Chinese and editorials and commentary by scientists with Chinese as the first language.

On April 23, 2025, the journal announced that it would not be accepting new manuscript submissions, "Due to recent changes in operational resources". The New York Times reported that editors had "a 'lack of confidence' that contracts for critical expenses like copy-editing and editorial software would be renewed after their impending expiration dates". In a final editorial on June 26, 2025, the Chief editor, Joel D. Kaufman, announced that editorial staff had transitioned into other jobs and that papers sent out for peer review had to be returned to authors for submission to other journals.

Environmental Health Perspectives was published as a Diamond Open Access journal since 2004, with no article processing costs for authors and free access for readers. Environmental Health Perspectives was one of the few journals that fulfilled the 2024 NIH Public Access Policy without any costs for authors and readers. Upon cessation of NIEHS support, the editor announced that "it may not … allow the journal to waive all publication costs to all authors."

Richard Woychik, Ph.D., NIEHS Director, and Trevor K. Archer, Ph.D., NIEHS Deputy Director, announced on June 26, 2025, that the journal and its archive were released to an external publisher.

According to the Environmental Data & Governance Initiative, the NIEHS-hosted website of Environmental Health Sciences went dark on December 1, 2025. Journal contents from 1972 on remain available on Pubmed Central.

On January 7, 2026, the American Chemical Society (ACS) published a press release, announcing "that Environmental Health Perspectives has joined the ACS journal portfolio". The journal would "remain a fully open access journal and all article publishing charges will be waived for manuscripts submitted to the journal through the end of 2026."
