= Academic Spring =

Reform movement

The Academic Spring was the designation, inspired by the Arab Spring, used for a short time in 2012 to indicate movements by academics, researchers, and scholars opposing the restrictive copyright and circulation of traditional academic journals and promoting free access online instead.

== History ==
There have been previous attempts to increase the availability of free and up-to-date scientific research. In 2004, there were reports in British media of a "revolution in academic publishing" which would make research freely available online but many scientists continued to publish their work in the traditional big name journals like Nature. The barriers to free access for recent scientific research became a hot topic in 2012, after a blog post by mathematician Timothy Gowers went viral in January. According to the Financial Times, the movement was named by Dennis Johnson of Melville House Publishing, though scientist Mike Taylor has suggested the name came from The Economist.

=== Research Works Act ===
In December 2011 the Research Works Act was proposed in the US Congress to restrict open access to research funded by the US federal government. This followed other similar proposed measures such as the Fair Copyright in Research Works Act. These attempts to limit free access to such material are controversial and have provoked lobbying for and against by numerous interested parties such as the Association of American Publishers and the American Library Association.

=== The Cost of Knowledge ===
In January 2012, Cambridge mathematician, Timothy Gowers, started a boycott of journals published by Elsevier. In part this was a reaction to their support for the Research Works Act. In response to an angry blog post by Gowers, the website The Cost of Knowledge was launched by a sympathetic reader. An online petition called The Cost of Knowledge was set up by fellow mathematician Tyler Neylon, to gather support for the boycott. By early April 2012, it had been signed by over eight thousand academics. As of mid-June 2012, the number of signatories exceeded 12,000.

=== Access2Research ===
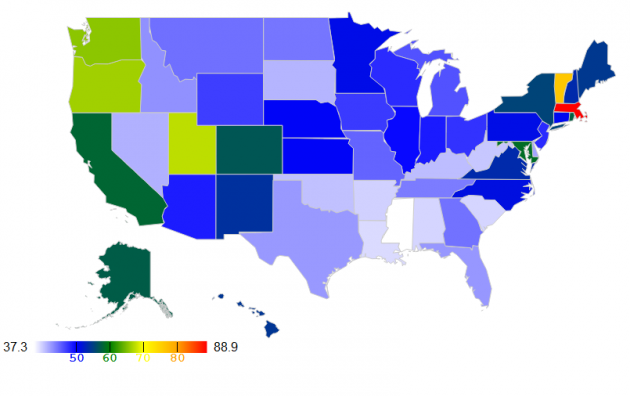
A normalized heatmap of per-capita signatures to the Access2Research petition by U.S. state. Highest support from Massachusetts (red), lowest from Mississippi (white).

In May 2012, a group of open-access activists formed the Access2Research initiative that went on to launch a petition to the White House to "require free access over the Internet to journal articles arising from taxpayer-funded research". The petition was signed by over 25,000 people within two weeks, which entitled it to an official response from the White House.

== Open access ==
Since about 2000, open access journals, which do not charge online readers, have been alternatives to the traditional journals. Successful publishers of these include BioMed Central which publishes over 200 journals, and the Public Library of Science, which publishes seven open access journals including PLoS ONE.

As part of the Academic Spring, the Howard Hughes Medical Institute, Max Planck Society and Wellcome Trust announced in April 2012 the establishment of eLife, which started publishing in October 2012.

== Commentary and reactions ==
Mike Taylor has argued that the Academic Spring may have some unexpected results beyond the obvious benefits. Referring to work by the biophysicist Cameron Neylon, he says that, because modern science is now more dependent on well-functioning networks than individuals, making information freely available may help computer-based analyses to provide opportunities for major scientific breakthroughs. Government and university officials have welcomed the prospect of saving on subscriptions which have been rising in cost, while universities' budgets have been shrinking. Mark Walport, the director of Wellcome Trust, has indicated that science sponsors do not mind having to fund publication in addition to the research. Not everyone has been supportive of the movement, with scientific publisher Kent Anderson calling it "shallow rhetoric aimed at the wrong target."

== See also ==
- Sci-Hub
- Library Genesis
