= H.R. 3699 =

H.R. 3699 or HR 3699 may refer to:

- The Research Works Act, a 2011 United States House of Representatives bill that prevents taxpayer funded research from being freely accessible online
- H.R. 3699, a 2009 United States House of Representatives bill to prohibit funding that would increase the U.S. military buildup in Afghanistan
- HR 3699, the designation of Iota Carinae, a star in the constellation Carina
