= Nunnari =

Nunnari is an Italian surname. Notable people with the surname include:

- Gianni Nunnari (born 1959), Italian film and television producer and executive
- Jodi Nunnari, American cell biologist and pioneer in the field of mitochondrial biology
- Paul Nunnari (born 1973), Australian Paralympic athlete
- Salvatore Nunnari (born 1939), Italian archbishop
- Talmadge Nunnari (born 1975), American baseball player
