= The Cost of Knowledge =

Protest movement against research publishing house Elsevier and for open science

Logo of the campaign

The Cost of Knowledge is a protest by academics against the business practices of academic journal publisher Elsevier. Among the reasons for the protests were a call for lower prices for journals and to promote increased open access to information. The main work of the project was to ask researchers to sign a statement committing not to support Elsevier journals by publishing, performing peer review, or providing editorial services for these journals.

== History ==
Before the advent of the Internet, it was difficult for scholars to distribute articles giving their research results. Historically, publishers performed services including proofreading, typesetting, copyediting, printing, and worldwide distribution. In more recent times, all researchers became expected to give the publishers digital copies of their work which needed no further processing – in other words, the modern academic is expected to do, often for free, duties traditionally assigned to the publisher, and for which, traditionally, the publisher is paid in exchange. For digital distribution, printing is unnecessary, copying is (almost) free, and worldwide distribution happens online instantly. Internet technology, and with it the aforementioned significant decrease in overhead costs, enabled the four major scientific publishers – Elsevier, Springer, Wiley, and Informa – to cut their expenditures such that they could consistently generate gross margins on revenue of over 33%.

=== Resignations of editorial boards ===
In 2006, the nine editorial board members of Oxford University's Elsevier-published mathematics journal Topology resigned because they agreed among themselves that Elsevier's publishing policies had "a significant and damaging effect on Topology's reputation in the mathematical research community." An Elsevier spokesperson disputed this, saying that "this still constitutes a pretty rare occurrence" and that the journal "is actually available today to more people than ever before". Journalists recognize this event as part of the precedent to The Cost of Knowledge campaign. In 2008, the Journal of Topology started independently of Elsevier, and Topology ended publication in 2009.

Similarly, in 2015 the entire editorial board of the Elsevier journal Lingua resigned and founded a new, open access journal called Glossa. Lingua continued to exist, albeit with a lower impact and much changed reputation.

== Website ==
The commitment which the campaign requests.

A website called "The Cost of Knowledge" appeared, inviting researchers and scholars to declare their commitment to not submit papers to Elsevier journals, not referee articles for Elsevier's journals, and not participate in the editorial boards.

== Signatories ==
On 8 February 2012, 34 prominent mathematicians who had signed The Cost of Knowledge released a joint statement of purpose explaining their reasons for supporting the protest. In addition to Timothy Gowers, Ingrid Daubechies, Juan J. Manfredi, Terence Tao, Wendelin Werner, Scott Aaronson, László Lovász, and John Baez are among the signatories. Many signatories are researchers in the fields of mathematics, computer science, and biology. On 1 February 2012, the declaration had a thousand signatories. By November 2018, over 17000 researchers had signed the petition. The success of the petition has been debated.

== Reaction from Elsevier ==
On 27 February 2012, Elsevier issued a statement on its website that declared that it has withdrawn support from the Research Works Act. Although the Cost of Knowledge movement was not mentioned, the statement indicated the hope that the move would "help create a less heated and more productive climate" for ongoing discussions with research funders. Hours after Elsevier's statement, Representatives Darrell Issa and Carolyn Maloney, who were sponsors of the bill, issued a joint statement saying that they would not push the bill in Congress. Earlier, Mike Taylor of the University of Bristol accused Issa and Maloney of being motivated by large donations that they received from Elsevier in 2011.

While participants in the boycott celebrated the dropping of support for the Research Works Act, Elsevier denied that their action was a result of the boycott and stated that they took this action at the request of those researchers who did not participate in the boycott.

On the same day, Elsevier released an open letter to the mathematics community, stating that its target is to reduce its prices to $11/article or less. Elsevier also opened the archives of 14 mathematics journals back to 1995 with a four-year moving wall. In late 2012, Elsevier made all of its "primary mathematics" journals open access up to 2008. The boycott remains in effect.

=== Change from status quo ===
On 21 January 2012, the mathematician Timothy Gowers called for a boycott of Elsevier with a post on his personal blog. This blog post attracted enough attention that other media sources commented on it as being part of the start of a movement. The three reasons he cited for the boycott are high subscription prices for individual journals, bundling subscriptions to journals of different value and importance, and Elsevier's support for SOPA, the PROTECT IP Act, and the Research Works Act. The "Statement of Purpose" on the Cost of Knowledge website explains that Elsevier was chosen as an initial focus for discontent due to a "widespread feeling among mathematicians that they are the worst offender." The statement further mentions "scandals, lawsuits, lobbying, etc." as reasons for focusing on Elsevier.

Elsevier disputed the claims, arguing that their prices are below the industry average, and stating that bundling is only one of several different options available to buy access to Elsevier journals. The company also claimed that its considerable profit margins are "simply a consequence of the firm's efficient operation". Critics of Elsevier claim that in 2010, 36% of Elsevier's reported revenues of US$3.2 billion was profit. Elsevier claimed to have an operating margin of 25.7% in 2010.

=== Impact and reception ===
In February 2012, analysts of the Exane Paribas bank reported a financial impact on Elsevier with the company's stock prices falling due to the boycott. Dennis Snower criticised the monopoly of scientific publishers, but said at the same time that he did not support the boycott even though he himself is the editor-in-chief of an open-access journal on economics. He thinks that more competition among the various journals should instead be encouraged. The Senate of the University of Kansas has been reported to consider joining the boycott of Elsevier.

In allusion to the revolutions of the Arab Spring, the German Frankfurter Allgemeine Zeitung daily newspaper called the movement the "Academic Spring" (German: Akademischer Frühling). When the British Wellcome Trust made a commitment to open up science, The Guardian similarly called this the "Academic Spring". After the Wellcome Trust announcement, The Cost of Knowledge campaign was recognized by that newspaper as the start of something new.

A 2016 study evaluating the boycott stated that in the past four years 38% of signatories had abandoned their "won't publish in an Elsevier outlet" commitment and that only around 5000 researchers were still clearly boycotting Elsevier by publishing elsewhere. It concludes "Few researchers have signed the petition in recent years, thus giving the impression the boycott has run its course." As of August 2025, there were 20,908 signatories.

Protests against high fees have rolled through into many institutional actions. As an example, in 2019, the University of California (UC) system announced that it was cancelling its Elsevier subscriptions, citing costs and lack of open access. Similar steps were taken by other universities, including MIT in 2020, SUNY in 2020, Florida State University in 2018, UNC Chapel Hill in 2020, and Louisiana State University in 2019. In 2021, the UC system negotiated a new 4-year "pilot" agreement with Elsevier that permits UC researchers to publish in Elsevier journals on an open-access basis and restores access to Elsevier journals for UC libraries, following similar open-access agreements with Carnegie Mellon University in 2019 (for 4 years) and the Norwegian university system in 2019 (for 2 years).

== See also ==
- Serials crisis
