= Journal of Cell Biology =

- Discipline: Cell biology
- Language: English
- Edited by: Jodi Nunnari

Publication details
- History: 1955–present
- Publisher: Rockefeller University Press (United States)
- Open access: Delayed, after 6 months
- Impact factor: 6.1 (2024)

Standard abbreviations
- ISO 4: J. Cell Biol.

Indexing
- ISSN: 0021-9525 (print); 1540-8140 (web)
- LCCN: 2001-227177
- JSTOR: 00219525
- OCLC no.: 1390147

Links
- Journal homepage

The Journal of Cell Biology is a peer-reviewed scientific journal that is owned by The Rockefeller University and published by Rockefeller University Press.

== History ==
In the early 1950s, a small group of biologists began to explore intracellular anatomy using the emerging technology of electron microscopy. Many of these researchers were at The Rockefeller Institute of Medicine, the predecessor of The Rockefeller University. As their work progressed to publication, they were disappointed with the limited quality of halftone image reproduction in the printed journals of the time, and frustrated by the narrow editorial policies of existing journals regarding their image-based results. In 1954, the Director of the Rockefeller Institute, Detlev Bronk, convened a luncheon to discuss the creation of a new journal as a venue for publication of this type of work.

The first issue of The Journal of Biophysical and Biochemical Cytology was published less than a year later on January 25, 1955. A subscription cost $15 per year. The list of editors comprised Richard S. Bear, H. Stanley Bennett, Albert L. Lehninger, George E. Palade, Keith R. Porter, Francis O. Schmitt, Franz Schrader, and Arnold M. Seligman. The instructions to authors described the scope of the journal, "The Journal of Biophysical and Biochemical Cytology is designed to provide a common medium for the publication of morphological, biophysical, and biochemical investigations on cells, their components, and their products. It will give special attention to reports on cellular organization at the colloidal and molecular levels and to studies integrating cytological information derived from various technical approaches." Recognizing that they needed a catchier title, the editors changed the name to The Journal of Cell Biology ("JCB") in 1962.

Many seminal discoveries have been published in the journal, including the first descriptions of numerous cellular functions and structures, such as the secretory pathway, mitochondrial and chloroplast DNA, microtubules, intermediate filaments, tight junctions (including occludins and claudins), adherens junctions, and cadherins.

== Key dates ==
- January 25, 1955: Publication of the first issue of The Journal of Biophysical and Biochemical Cytology.
- January 1961 – December 1983: Raymond Griffiths is Executive Editor.
- January 1962: Journal name changed to The Journal of Cell Biology.
- January 1984 – December 1998: Bernie Gilula is Editor in Chief.
- January 13, 1997: First issue of JCB is published online.
- April 1997 – April 2007: Mike Rossner is Managing Editor.
- January 1999 – December 2008: Ira Mellman is Editor in Chief.
- July 2000: Authors allowed to post the final, published pdf file of their articles on their own websites.
- January 2001: JCB begins to make its online content free to the public six months after publication.
- July 2002: JCB adopts completely electronic workflow.
- September 2002: JCB begins screening all digital images for evidence of manipulation.
- January 2003: JCB pioneers RGB workflow for color digital images.
- June 2003: JCB releases all of its back content older than six months for free to the public back to volume 1, issue 1.
- May 2007 – July 2010: Emma Hill is Executive Editor.
- November 2007: JCB begins posting all of its content on PubMed Central, where it is available for free to the public six months after publication.
- May 1, 2008: New copyright policy allows authors to retain copyright to their own works and third parties to reuse JCB content under a Creative Commons license.
- December 2008: JCB launches Dataviewer
- January 2009 – September 2014: Tom Misteli is Editor in Chief.
- September 2010 – December 2014: Elizabeth H. Williams is Executive Editor.
- October 2014 – May 2015: Alan Hall is Editor in Chief.
- April 2015 – August 2019: Rebecca Alvania is Executive Editor.
- August 2015 – present: Jodi Nunnari is Editor in Chief.
- November 2019 – present: Tim Spencer is Executive Editor

== Abstracting and indexing ==
The journal is abstracted and indexed in:

Science Citation Index Expanded

Index Medicus/MEDLINE/PubMed

Scopus

According to the Journal Citation Reports, the journal has a 2024 impact factor of 6.1, ranking it 28th out of 201 journals in the category "Cell Biology".

== Online access ==
The journal was first published online on January 13, 1997. All content was free to the public during that first year of online publication. In January 1998, all primary research content was placed under access controls, but all news and review content remained free to the public immediately after publication.

In January 2001, in response to calls from the research community to provide free access to the results of publicly funded research, the journal was one of the first to release its primary research content to the public 6 months after publication.

In June 2003, all content, starting from volume 1, issue 1, was posted online and provided for free.

In November 2007, in anticipation of the National Institutes of Health mandate on public access to the results of NIH-funded research, the journal began depositing all of its content in PubMed Central, where the final, published version is released to the public 6 months after publication.

== Copyright and third party use ==
In July 2000, the journal was one of the first to allow authors to post the final, published pdf file of their articles on their own websites. On May 1, 2008, the copyright policy was changed, allowing authors to retain copyright to their own works. At the same time, the content of the journal was opened up to use by third parties under a Creative Commons license. The only restriction on this use by third parties is that they cannot create a free mirror site within the first six months after publication.

== Data integrity ==
=== Origins of image screening ===
In 2002, the journal adopted a completely electronic production workflow. This means that all text is submitted as electronic document files and all figures are submitted as electronic image files. While formatting figure files for an accepted manuscript, Mike Rossner, who was then the managing editor, discovered a Western blot in which the intensity of a single band had been selectively adjusted relative to the other bands. The original data were obtained from the authors, and it was evident that the manipulation affected the interpretation of the data. The editorial acceptance of the manuscript was revoked, and the journal immediately initiated a policy to screen all images in all accepted papers for evidence of image manipulation.

=== Guidelines for handling digital images ===
In consultation with practicing scientists on the editorial board, guidelines were developed for handling digital images, which were first published in June 2003.

=== Publicity about image manipulation and image screening ===
The journal's image screening program was publicized in an article in Nature in April 2005, entitled "CSI Cell Biology". On Christmas Day, 2005, The New York Times published an article showing that image manipulation was part of the scientific fraud perpetrated by Hwang Woo-Suk and colleagues. When it became apparent that the Journal of Cell Biology's screening program would have detected the image manipulation before publication, the New York Times highlighted the journal's process on the cover page of its Science Times section on January 24, 2006. This raised awareness among the public and among other biomedical journals of the potential value of image screening by journal editors.

=== Response of National Academy of Sciences ===
In February 2006, the editors voiced the need for community-sanctioned standards for maintaining data integrity in a letter to United States National Academy of Sciences president Ralph Cicerone. The letter, along with subsequent concerns about digital data raised by other scientific publishers, provided the impetus for a study by the Committee on Science, Engineering, and Public Policy (a joint unit of the academy, the National Academy of Engineering, and the Institute of Medicine) to examine the issue of data integrity. The study was commissioned in May 2006.

Mike Rossner presented a talk to the Committee at an open meeting in April 2007, in which he described the experience of JCB and the other Rockefeller University Press journals in handling image manipulation. He noted that it should be the responsibility of the research community to develop standards of data integrity, but JCB had taken on this role because no such standards existed when JCB first confronted the problem in 2002.

The Committee released its report, entitled "Ensuring the Integrity, Accessibility, and Stewardship of Research Data in the Digital Age, in July 2009. The NAS announcement specifically cited JCB for its proactive steps in establishing specific guidelines for "acceptable and unacceptable ways to alter images". The report approached the problem of data integrity from the perspective of both truth and accuracy in data acquisition and reporting, and from the perspective of accessibility of data over time. It provided no specific standards for maintaining data integrity and no recommendations for enforcing those standards once established. The report reached the broad conclusion that "researchers themselves are responsible for ensuring the integrity of their research data".

== Technical innovations ==
=== The RGB standard ===
JCB was the first journal to adopt the "RGB Standard" for reproduction of color images. To maximize the quality of color image reproduction, JCB declared in January 2004 that the online version of the journal is the "journal of record", and images would be reproduced online using authors' files in the same color scheme (Red, Green, Blue) in which they are acquired by digital cameras, and which is used to display them on a computer monitor.

Previously, authors were asked to convert their RGB files to the CMYK color scheme necessary for printing on paper, which results in a substantial loss of image luster. Those CMYK files were then converted back to RGB by the publisher to post online, resulting in a second round of alteration to the original colors. The advent of the RGB workflow allowed colors to be displayed in the online publication exactly as they appeared in the authors' original files.

=== The JCB DataViewer ===
On December 1, 2008, the JCB launched the JCB DataViewer – the first browser-based application for viewing original, multi-dimensional image data. This application was built in conjunction with Glencoe Software using a data management engine based on the OMERO software developed by the Open Microscopy Environment. Glencoe Software also developed a "Rollup" application for uploading original image files to the DataViewer. The DataViewer supports numerous proprietary files types from various microscopes and gel documentation systems.

This revolutionary application allows JCB authors to present multidimensional image data as they were acquired, giving them the opportunity to share data that were not possible to share previously. JCB readers get to see original data supporting a published paper, and they can interact with those data by scrolling through a z stack or a stack of time-lapse images. Users can select individual channels to view or view all channels separately on the same screen. They can also produce line plots of pixel intensities along any horizontal or vertical axis.

An update to the software in August 2012 allows the user to smoothly transition from 1 millimeter to 1 micrometer magnification of images assembled from optical and electron microscopes. As an example, they provide a complete image of a zebrafish embryo.
