= Federal Research Public Access Act =

The Federal Research Public Access Act (FRPAA) is a proposal to require open public access to research funded by eleven U.S. federal government agencies. It was originally proposed by Senators John Cornyn and Joe Lieberman in 2006 and then again in 2010, and then once more in 2012.

A later version of the bill, the Fair Access to Science and Technology Research Act, was introduced in 2013, 2015 and 2017.

== Provisions of bill ==
The FRPAA would require that those eleven agencies with research expenditures over $100 million, create online repositories of journal articles of the research completed by that agency and make them publicly available. They must be maintained and preserved by the agency, or another repository that permits free and open access. It must be available to users without charge within six months after it has been published in a peer-reviewed journal.

The agencies included in this bill are:

- Department of Agriculture
- Department of Commerce
- Department of Defense
- Department of Education
- Department of Energy
- Department of Health and Human Services
- Department of Homeland Security
- Department of Transportation
- Environmental Protection Agency
- National Aeronautics and Space Administration
- National Science Foundation

== Legislative history ==
Congress	Short title	Bill number(s)	Date introduced	Sponsor(s)	# of cosponsors	Latest status
109th Congress	Federal Research Public Access Act of 2006	S. 2695	May 2, 2006	John Cornyn (R-TX)	2	Died in committee
111th Congress	Federal Research Public Access Act of 2009	H.R. 5037	April 15, 2010	Mike Doyle (D-PA)	16	Died in committee
111th Congress	Federal Research Public Access Act of 2010	H.R. 5253	May 6, 2010	Todd Tiahrt (R-KS)	0	Died in committee
111th Congress	Federal Research Public Access Act of 2009	S. 1373	June 25, 2009	Joe Lieberman (I-CT)	1	Died in committee
112th Congress	Federal Research Public Access Act of 2012	H.R. 4004	February 9, 2012	Mike Doyle (D-PA)	34	Died in committee
112th Congress	Federal Research Public Access Act of 2012	S. 2096	February 9, 2012	John Cornyn (R-TX)	3	Died in committee

== Reaction ==
=== Support ===
In addition to Senator John Cornyn and Senator Joe Lieberman, Representative Michael F. Doyle, along with Frederick Boucher, Michael Capuano, Jerry Costello, Bill Foster, Barney Frank, Gregg Harper, Paul Hodes, Tim Holden, Dennis Kucinich, Rick Larsen, Zoe Lofgren, Stephen Lynch, Dana Rohrabacher, Fortney Stark, Debbie Wasserman Schultz, and Henry Waxman have co-sponsored a similar bill in the House of Representatives (H.R. 5037).

As of July 19, 2010, 120 Higher Education Leaders support this bill.

On March 28, 2012, 52 Nobel Laureates signed an open letter to the US Congress expressing their support for this bill.

=== Opposition ===
The Association of American Publishers opposes the bill on behalf of 81 scholarly publishing organizations alleging that the bill forces the same deadline for disciplines in which that deadline is burdensome, limits the options of government-funded researchers, forces a change in publishers' business models, and will create a cost burden on federal agencies.

== See also ==
- Open access mandate
- NIH Public Access Policy
- Fair Copyright in Research Works Act
- Research Works Act
