= Jodi Nunnari =

American cell biologist

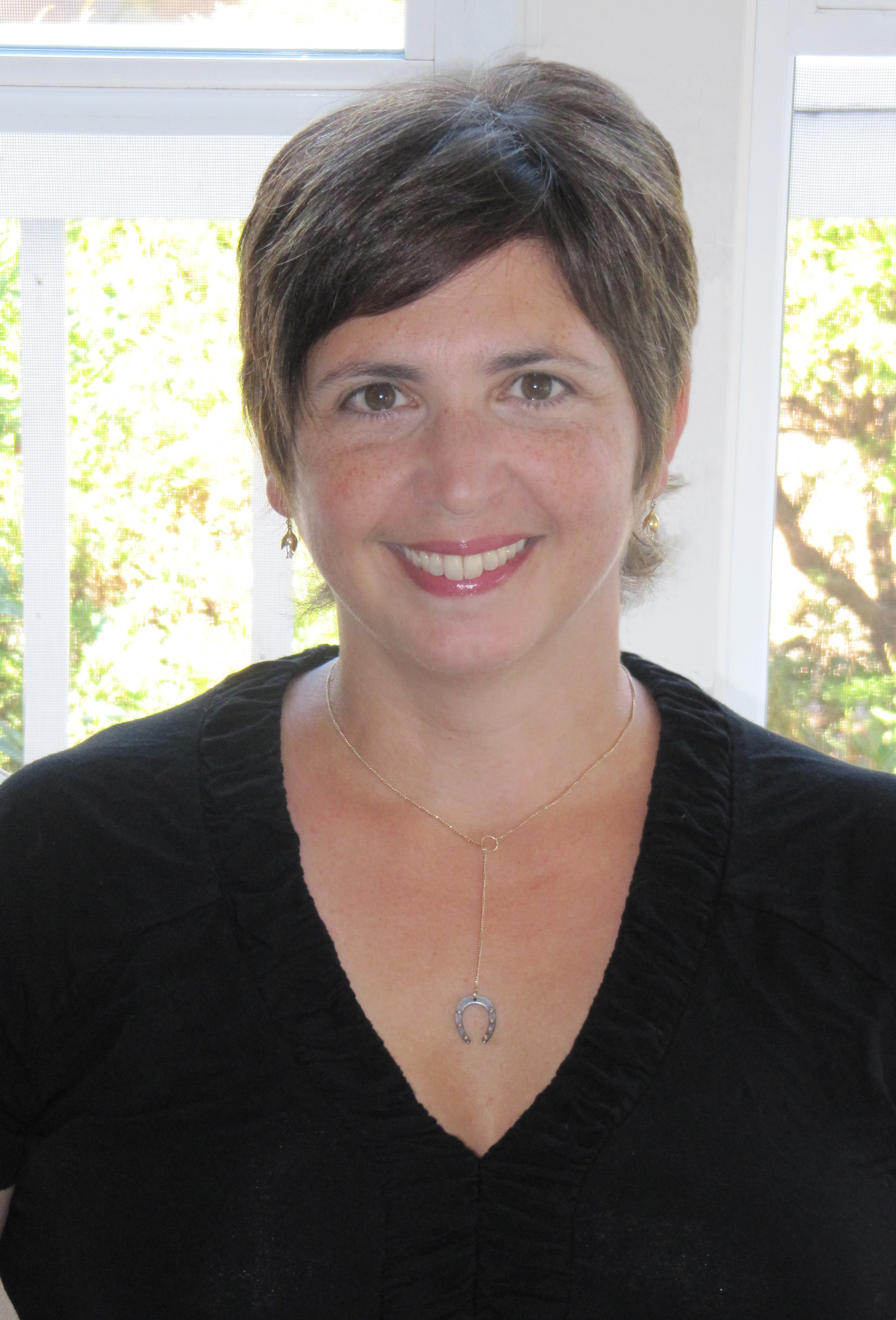
- Born: Cleveland, Ohio, U.S.
- Occupation: Cell biologist

Academic background
- Education: College of Wooster; Vanderbilt University

Jodi Nunnari is an American cell biologist and pioneer in the field of mitochondrial biology. She is currently a founding principal investigator at the biotechnology company Altos Labs, and director of its Bay Area Institute of Science. She is a distinguished professor emerita and former chair of the Department of Molecular and Cellular Biology at the University of California, Davis while also serving as the editor-in-chief of the Journal of Cell Biology. Nunnari served as president of the American Society for Cell Biology in 2018.

== Early life and education ==
Nunnari was born in Cleveland, Ohio, and studied chemistry at the College of Wooster before obtaining a Ph.D. in pharmacology from Vanderbilt University, working with Lee Limbird. As a postdoctoral fellow with Peter Walter at the University of California, San Francisco, Nunnari pioneered the use of green fluorescent protein to visualize mitochondria in budding yeast, helping to establish the field of mitochondrial dynamics.

== Research and career ==
Nunnari was the first to describe mitochondria as a dynamic network in homeostatic balance and her lab described the mitochondrial division and fusion machines. Her lab has uncovered additional mechanisms underlying mitochondrial behavior, including how mitochondrial membranes are organized, how mitochondria communicate with the endoplasmic reticulum, and how the mitochondrial genome is transmitted. Since obtaining an independent position at the University of California, Davis, Nunnari and colleagues have investigated the molecular mechanisms underlying mitochondrial fission and fusion and explored the structure and function of membrane contact sites that link mitochondria with other organelles.

Nunnari was named editor-in-chief of the Journal of Cell Biology in August 2015, becoming the first woman to serve in this position. She is a member of the American Society for Cell Biology and served as the society's president in 2018. She is also a member of the American Society for Biochemistry and Molecular Biology. Nunnari was elected as a member of the National Academy of Sciences in 2017, of the European Molecular Biology Organization in 2020, and of the American Academy of Arts and Sciences in 2021.

In 2022, Nunnari became a founding principal investigator at Altos Labs, a company focused on cellular rejuvenation programming to restore cell health and resilience, with the goal of reversing disease to transform medicine. At Altos, her lab has continued to uncover mechanisms underlying mitochondrial function and behavior, including how mitochondrial biogenesis is controlled, how mitochondria contribute to lipid homeostasis, and how mitochondrial metabolism contributes to organismal health and rejuvenation. In 2023, Jodi was named director of the Bay Area Institute Science of Altos Labs.

== Awards and honors ==
- 2026 College of Wooster honorary Doctor of Science.
- 2021 Associate Member, EMBO
- 2021 AAAS, Member
- 2018 American Society for Cell Biology (ASCB) President
- 2017 Feodor Lynen Medal, German Society for Biochemistry and Molecular Biology
- 2017 National Academy of Sciences, Member
- 2015 NIH MERIT award
