= Michael W. Carroll =

American law professor

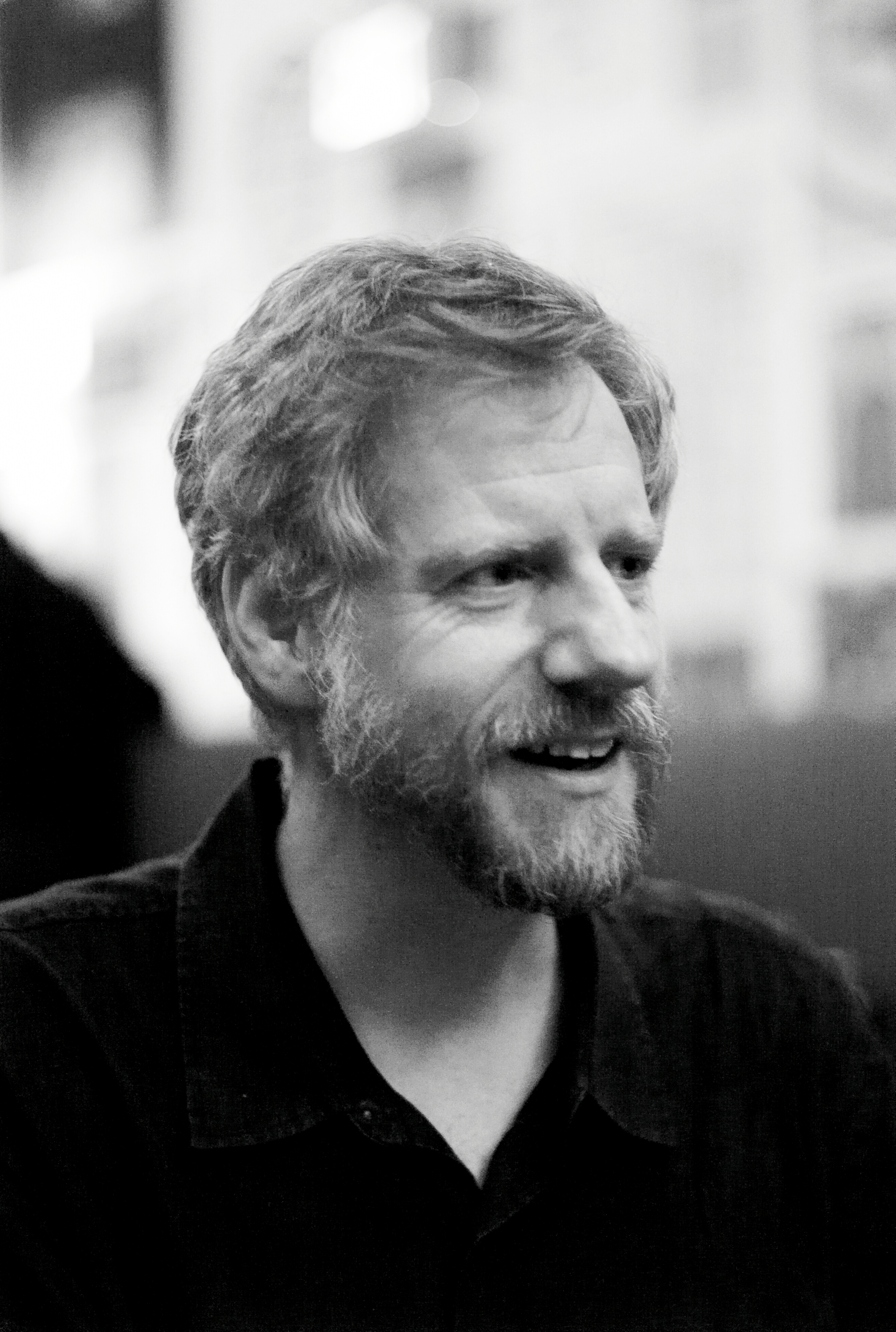
- Michael W. Carroll, by Joi Ito
- Occupation: Professor of law
- Known for: Creative Commons

Academic background
- Education: University of Chicago, A.B.; Georgetown University, J.D.

Academic work
- Institutions: American University Washington College of Law
- Main interests: Intellectual property law; electronic commerce; cyberlaw

Michael W. Carroll is a law professor and director of the Program on Information Justice and Intellectual Property at American University's Washington College of Law. Carroll is one of the founding Board Members of Creative Commons, a not-for-profit organization devoted to expanding the range of creative work available for others to legally build upon and share. He also is a member of the Board of Directors of the Public Library of Science PLOS and served on the National Academy of Sciences' Board on Research Data and Information from 2008 to 2013.

== Education ==
Michael W. Carroll received his A.B. from the University of Chicago and his J.D. magna cum laude from the Georgetown University Law Center. While in law school, he was the editor-in-chief of the American Criminal Law Review.

== Early career ==
After law school, Carroll worked as an associate attorney at Wilmer, Cutler & Pickering for about a year. Subsequently Carroll clerked for US District Court Judge Joyce Hens Green and D.C. Circuit Judge Judith W. Rogers. He returned to Wilmer to practice in the intellectual property and e-commerce areas. He began his teaching career in 2001 at the Villanova University School of Law.

== Career ==
Carroll's scholarly work focuses on intellectual property law and the law of electronic commerce. Carroll also is an active advocate for open access to the peer-reviewed scholarly periodical literature. He has written and lectured on the subject, and he is the author of the SPARC Author's Addendum. He currently serves on the Advisory Board of the National Security Law Brief. Carroll's scholarly work focuses on intellectual property law and the law of electronic commerce. Carroll also is an active advocate for open access to the peer-reviewed scholarly periodical literature. He has written and lectured on the subject, and he is the author of the SPARC Author's Addendum. He currently serves on the Advisory Board of the National Security Law Brief.

Carroll was a founding Board Member of the Creative Commons, and regularly attends and speaks at the Creative Commons Global Summit events.

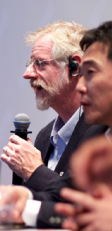
Carroll at the Creative Commons Global Summit in 2015

== Selected publications ==
- Creative Commons as Conversational Copyright, (Peter Yu, ed., Praeger 2007).
- Fixing Fair Use, 85 N.C. L. Rev. 1087 (2007).
- Patent Injunctions and the Problem of Uniformity Cost, 13 Mich. Telecommun. & Tech. L. Rev. 421 (2007).
- Creative Commons and the New Intermediaries, Mich. St. L. Rev. (2006).
- The Movement for Open Access Law, 10 Lewis & Clark L. Rev. 741 (2006).
- One for All: The Problem of Uniformity Cost in Intellectual Property Law, 15 Am. U. L. Rev. 845 (2006).
- The Struggle for Music Copyright, 57 Fla. L. Rev. 907 (2005).
- Whose Music Is It Anyway?: How We Came To View Musical Expression As A Form Of Property, 72 U. Cin. L. Rev. 1405 (2004).
- A Primer on U.S. Intellectual Property Rights Applicable to Music Information Retrieval Systems, U. Ill. J.L. Tech. & Pol'y (2003).
- Disruptive Technology and Common Law Lawmaking: A Brief Analysis of A&M Records, Inc. v. Napster, Inc., 9 Vill. Sports & Ent. L.J. 5 (2002).
- Garbage In: Emerging Media and Regulation of Unsolicited Commercial Solicitations, Berkeley Tech. L.J. 11.2 (1996).
