= Academic journal publishing reform =

Advocacy for changes in the way academic journals are created and distributed

The Open Access logo used by PLoS

Academic journal publishing reform is the advocacy for changes in the way academic journals are created and distributed in the age of the Internet and the advent of electronic publishing. Since the rise of the Internet, people have organized campaigns to change the relationships among and between academic authors, their traditional distributors and their readership. Most of the discussion has centered on taking advantage of benefits offered by the Internet's capacity for widespread distribution of reading material.

== History ==
Before the advent of the Internet, it was difficult for scholars to distribute articles giving their research results. Historically publishers performed services including proofreading, typesetting, copy editing, printing, and worldwide distribution. In modern times all researchers became expected to give the publishers digital copies of their work which needed no further processing. For digital distribution printing was unnecessary, copying was free, and worldwide distribution happens online instantly. In science journal publishing, Internet technology enabled the Big Five major scientific publishers—Elsevier, Springer, Wiley, Taylor and Francis and American Chemical Society—to cut their expenditures such that they could consistently generate profits of over 35% per year. In 2017 these five published 56% of all journal articles. The remaining 44% were published by over 200 small publishers.

The Internet made it easier for researchers to do work which had previously been done by publishers, and some people began to feel that they did not need to pay for the services of publishers. This perception was a problem for publishers, who stated that their services were still necessary at the rates they asked. Critics began to describe publishers' practices with terms such as "corporate scam" and "racket". Scholars sometimes obtain articles from fellow scholars through unofficial channels, such as posting requests on Twitter using the hashtag "#icanhazpdf" (a play on the I Can Has Cheezburger? meme), to avoid paying publishers' access charges. In 2004, there were reports in British media of a "revolution in academic publishing" which would make research freely available online but many scientists continued to publish their work in the traditional big name journals like Nature.

For a short time in 2012, the name Academic Spring, inspired by the Arab Spring, was used to indicate movements by academics, researchers, and scholars opposing the restrictive copyright and circulation of traditional academic journals and promoting free access online instead. The barriers to free access for recent scientific research became a hot topic in 2012, after a blog post by mathematician Timothy Gowers went viral in January. According to the Financial Times, the movement was named by Dennis Johnson of Melville House Publishing, though scientist Mike Taylor has suggested the name came from The Economist.

Mike Taylor argued that the Academic Spring may have some unexpected results beyond the obvious benefits. Referring to work by the biophysicist Cameron Neylon, he says that, because modern science is now more dependent on well-functioning networks than individuals, making information freely available may help computer-based analyses to provide opportunities for major scientific breakthroughs. Government and university officials have welcomed the prospect of saving on subscriptions which have been rising in cost, while universities' budgets have been shrinking. Mark Walport, the director of Wellcome Trust, has indicated that science sponsors do not mind having to fund publication in addition to the research. Not everyone has been supportive of the movement, with scientific publisher Kent Anderson calling it "shallow rhetoric aimed at the wrong target."

== Motivations for reform ==
Calls for reform have been supported by evidence on editorial governance; a 2025 systematic review of global health journals found that editorial board composition remains heavily skewed toward scholars based in high-income countries, suggesting the need for structural rather than purely representational change. Although it has some historical precedent, open access became desired in response to the advent of electronic publishing as part of a broader desire for academic journal publishing reform. Electronic publishing created new benefits as compared to paper publishing but beyond that, it contributed to causing problems in traditional publishing models.

The premises behind open access are that there are viable funding models to maintain traditional academic publishing standards of quality while also making the following changes to the field:

1. Rather than making journals be available through a subscription business model, all academic publications should be free to read and published with some other funding model. Publications should be gratis or "free to read".
2. Rather than applying traditional notions of copyright to academic publications, readers should be free to build upon the research of others. Publications should be libre or "free to build upon".
3. Everyone should have greater awareness of the serious social problems caused by restricting access to academic research.
4. Everyone should recognize that there are serious economic challenges for the future of academic publishing. Even though open access models are problematic, traditional publishing models definitely are not sustainable and something radical needs to change immediately. Moore proposes designing multiple infrastructural interventions to facilitate experiments in collectivity.

Open access also has ambitions beyond merely granting access to academic publications, as access to research is only a tool for helping people achieve other goals. Open access advances scholarly pursuits in the fields of open data, open government, open educational resources, free and open-source software, and open science, among others.

=== Problems addressed by academic publishing reform ===
The motivations for academic journal publishing reform include the ability of computers to store large amounts of information, the advantages of giving more researchers access to preprints, and the potential for interactivity between researchers.

Various studies showed that the demand for open access research was such that freely available articles consistently had impact factors which were higher than articles published under restricted access.

Some universities reported that modern "package deal" subscriptions were too costly for them to maintain, and that they would prefer to subscribe to journals individually to save money.

The problems which led to discussion about academic publishing reform have been considered in the context of what provision of open access might provide. Here are some of the problems in academic publishing which open access advocates purport that open access would address:

1. A pricing crisis called the serials crisis has been growing in the decades before open access and remains today. The academic publishing industry has increased prices of academic journals faster than inflation and beyond the library budgets.
2. The pricing crisis does not only mean strain to budgets, but also that researchers actually are losing access to journals.
3. Not even the wealthiest libraries in the world are able to afford all the journals that their users are demanding, and less rich libraries are severely harmed by lack of access to journals.
4. Publishers are using "bundling" strategies to sell journals, and this marketing strategy is criticized by many libraries as forcing them to pay for unpopular journals which their users are not demanding, while squeezing out of library budgets smaller publishers, who cannot offer bundled subscriptions.
5. Libraries are cutting their book budgets to pay for academic journals.
6. Libraries do not own electronic journals in permanent archival form as they do paper copies, so if they have to cancel a subscription then they lose all subscribed journals. This did not happen with paper journals, and yet costs historically have been higher for electronic versions.
7. Academic publishers get essential assets from their subscribers in a way that other publishers do not. Authors donate the texts of academic journals to the publishers and grant rights to publish them, and editors and referees donate peer-review to validate the articles. The people writing the journals are questioning the increased pressure put upon them to pay higher prices for the journal produced by their community.
8. Conventional publishers are using a business model which requires access barriers and creates artificial scarcity. All publishers need revenue, but open access promises models in which scarcity is fundamental to raising revenue.
9. Scholarly publishing depends heavily on government policy, public subsidies, gift economy, and anti-competitive practices, yet all of these things are in conflict with the conventional academic publishing model of restricting access to works.
10. Toll access journals compete more for authors to donate content to them than they compete for subscribers to pay for the work. This is because every scholarly journal has a natural monopoly over the information of its field. Because of this, the market for pricing journals does not have feedback because it is outside of traditional market forces, and the prices have no control to drive it to serve the needs of the market.
11. Besides the natural monopoly, there is supporting evidence that prices are artificially inflated to benefit publishers while harming the market. Evidence includes the trend of large publishers to have accelerating prices increases greater than small publishers, when in traditional markets high volume and high sales enables cost savings and lower prices.
12. Conventional publishers fund "content protection" actions which restrict and police content sharing.
13. For-profit publishers have economic incentives to decrease rates of rejected articles so that they publish more content to sell. No such market force exists if selling content for money is not a motivating factor.
14. Many researchers are unaware that it might be possible for them to have all the research articles they need, and just accept it as fate that they will always be without some of the articles they would like to read.
15. Access to toll-access journals is not scaling with increases in research and publishing, and the academic publishers are under market forces to restrict increases in publishing and indirectly because of that they are restricting the growth of research.

== Motivations against reform ==
Publishers state that if profit was not a consideration in the pricing of journals then the cost of accessing those journals would not substantially change. Publishers also state that they add value to publications in many ways, and without academic publishing as an institution the readership would miss these services and fewer people would have access to articles.

Critics of open access have suggested that by itself, this is not a solution to scientific publishing's most serious problem – it simply changes the paths through which ever-increasing sums of money flow. Evidence for this does exist and for example, Yale University ended its financial support of BioMed Central's Open Access Membership program effective July 27, 2007. In their announcement, they stated,

The libraries' BioMedCentral membership represented an opportunity to test the technical feasibility and the business model of this open access publisher. While the technology proved acceptable, the business model failed to provide a viable long-term revenue base built upon logical and scalable options. Instead, BioMedCentral has asked libraries for larger and larger contributions to subsidize their activities. Starting with 2005, BioMed Central article charges cost the libraries $4,658, comparable to single biomedicine journal subscription. The cost of article charges for 2006 then jumped to $31,625. The article charges have continued to soar in 2007 with the libraries charged $29,635 through June 2007, with $34,965 in potential additional article charges in submission.

A similar situation is reported from the University of Maryland, and Phil Davis commented that,

The assumptions that open access publishing is both cheaper and more sustainable than the traditional subscription model are featured in many of these mandates. But they remain just that — assumptions. In reality, the data from Cornell show just the opposite. Institutions like the University of Maryland would pay much more under an author-pays model, as would most research-intensive universities, and the rise in author processing charges (APCs) rivals the inflation felt at any time under the subscription model.

Opponents of the open access model see publishers as a part of the scholarly information chain and view a pay-for-access model as being necessary in ensuring that publishers are adequately compensated for their work. "In fact, most STM [Scientific, Technical and Medical] publishers are not profit-seeking corporations from outside the scholarly community, but rather learned societies and other non-profit entities, many of which rely on income from journal subscriptions to support their conferences, member services, and scholarly endeavors". Scholarly journal publishers that support pay-for-access claim that the "gatekeeper" role they play, maintaining a scholarly reputation, arranging for peer review, and editing and indexing articles, require economic resources that are not supplied under an open access model. Conventional journal publishers may also lose customers to open access publishers who compete with them. The Partnership for Research Integrity in Science and Medicine (PRISM), a lobbying organization formed by the Association of American Publishers (AAP), is opposed to the open access movement. PRISM and AAP have lobbied against the increasing trend amongst funding organizations to require open publication, describing it as "government interference" and a threat to peer review.

For researchers, publishing an article in a reputable scientific journal is perceived as being beneficial to one's reputation among scientific peers and in advancing one's academic career. There is a concern that the perception of open access journals do not have the same reputation, which will lead to less publishing. Park and Qin discuss the perceptions that academics have with regard to open access journals. One concern that academics have "are growing concerns about how to promote [Open Access] publishing." Park and Qin also state, "The general perception is that [Open Access] journals are new, and therefore many uncertainties, such as quality and sustainability, exist."

Journal article authors are generally not directly financially compensated for their work beyond their institutional salaries and the indirect benefits that an enhanced reputation provides in terms of institutional funding, job offers, and peer collaboration.

There are those, for example PRISM, who think that open access is unnecessary or even harmful. David Goodman argued that there is no need for those outside major academic institutions to have access to primary publications, at least in some fields.

The argument that publicly funded research should be made openly available has been countered with the assertion that "taxes are generally not paid so that taxpayers can access research results, but rather so that society can benefit from the results of that research; in the form of new medical treatments, for example. Publishers claim that 90% of potential readers can access 90% of all available content through national or research libraries, and while this may not be as easy as accessing an article online directly it is certainly possible." The argument for tax-payer funded research is only applicable in certain countries as well. For instance in Australia, 80% of research funding comes through taxes, whereas in Japan and Switzerland, only approximately 10% is from the public coffers.

For various reasons open access journals have been established by predatory publishers who seek to use the model to make money without regard to producing a quality journal. The causes of predatory open access publishing include the low barrier to creating the appearance of a legitimate digital journal and funding models which may include author publishing costs rather than subscription sales. University librarian Jeffrey Beall published a "List of Predatory Publishers" and an accompanying methodology for identifying publishers who have editorial and financial practices which are contrary to the ideal of good research publishing practices.

== Reform initiatives ==
=== Public Library of Science ===
The Public Library of Science is a nonprofit open-access scientific publishing project aimed at creating a library of open access journals and other scientific literature under an open content license. The founding of the organization had its origins in a 2001 online petition calling for all scientists to pledge that from September 2001 they would discontinue submission of papers to journals which did not make the full-text of their papers available to all, free and unfettered, either immediately or after a delay of several months. The petition collected 34,000 signatures but the publishers took no strong response to the demands. Shortly thereafter, the Public Library of Science was founded as an alternative to traditional publishing.

=== HINARI ===
HINARI is a 2002 project of the World Health Organization and major publishers to enable developing countries to access collections of biomedical and health literature online at reduced subscription costs.

=== Research Works Act ===
The Research Works Act was a bill of the United States Congress which would have prohibited all laws which would require an open access mandate when US-government-funded researchers published their work. The proposers of the law stated that it would "ensure the continued publication and integrity of peer-reviewed research works by the private sector". This followed other similar proposed measures such as the Fair Copyright in Research Works Act. These attempts to limit free access to such material are controversial and have provoked lobbying for and against by numerous interested parties such as the Association of American Publishers and the American Library Association. Critics of the law stated that it was the moment that "academic publishers gave up all pretence of being on the side of scientists." In February 2012, Elsevier withdrew its support for the bill. Following this statement, the sponsors of the bill announced they will also withdraw their support.

=== The Cost of Knowledge ===
In January 2012, Cambridge mathematician Timothy Gowers, started a boycott of journals published by Elsevier, in part a reaction to their support for the Research Works Act. In response to an angry blog post by Gowers, the website The Cost of Knowledge was launched by a sympathetic reader. An online petition called The Cost of Knowledge was set up by fellow mathematician Tyler Neylon, to gather support for the boycott. By early April 2012, it had been signed by over eight thousand academics. As of mid-June 2012, the number of signatories exceeded 12,000.

=== Access2Research ===
In May 2012, a group of open-access activists formed the Access2Research initiative that went on to launch a petition to the White House to "require free access over the Internet to journal articles arising from taxpayer-funded research". The petition was signed by over 25,000 people within two weeks, which entitled it to an official response from the White House.

=== PeerJ ===
PeerJ is an open-access journal launched in 2012 that charges publication fees per researcher, not per article, resulting in what has been called "a flat fee for 'all you can publish'".

=== Public Knowledge Project ===
Since 1998, PKP has been developing free open source software platforms for managing and publishing peer-reviewed open access journals and monographs, with Open Journal Systems used by more than 7,000 active journals in 2013.

=== Schekman boycott ===
2013 Nobel Prize winner Randy Schekman called for a boycott of traditional academic journals including Nature, Cell, and Science. Instead he promoted the open access journal eLife.

=== Initiative for Open Citations ===
Initiative for Open Citations is a CrossRef initiative for improved citation analysis. It was supported by majority of the publishers effective from April 2017.

=== Diamond Open Access journals ===
Diamond open access journals have been promoted as the ultimate solution to serials crisis. Under this model, neither the authors nor the readers pay for access or publication, and the resources required to run the journal are provided by scientists on a voluntary basis, by governments or by philanthropic grants. Although the Diamond OA model turned out to be successful in creating a large number of journals, the percentage of publications in such journals remains low, possibly due to a low prestige of these new journals and due to concerns with their long-term viability.
