= John Conyers =

American politician (1929–2019)

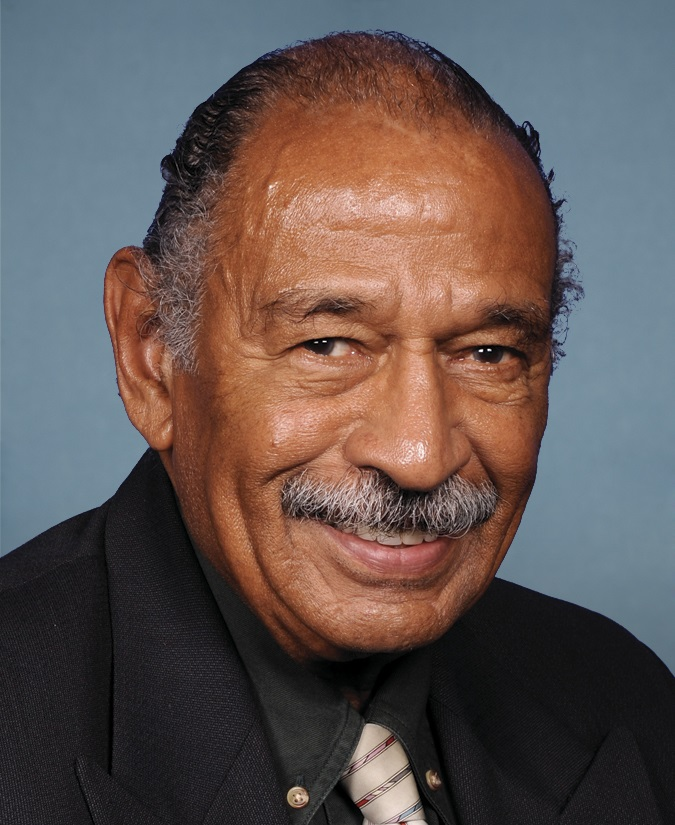
- Official portrait, 2013

44th Dean of the United States House of Representatives
- In office January 3, 2015 – December 5, 2017
- Preceded by: John Dingell
- Succeeded by: Don Young

Member of the U.S. House of Representatives from Michigan
- In office January 3, 1965 – December 5, 2017
- Preceded by: District established (redistricting)
- Succeeded by: Brenda Jones
- Constituency: 1st district (1965–1993); 14th district (1993–2013); 13th district (2013–2017)

Ranking Member of the House Judiciary Committee
- In office January 3, 2011 – December 5, 2017
- Preceded by: Lamar Smith
- Succeeded by: Jerry Nadler
- In office January 3, 1995 – January 3, 2007
- Preceded by: Hamilton Fish IV
- Succeeded by: Lamar Smith

Chair of the House Judiciary Committee
- In office January 3, 2007 – January 3, 2011
- Preceded by: Jim Sensenbrenner
- Succeeded by: Lamar Smith

Chair of the House Oversight Committee
- In office January 3, 1989 – January 3, 1995
- Preceded by: Jack Brooks
- Succeeded by: William F. Clinger Jr.

Personal details
- Born: John James Conyers Jr. May 16, 1929 Detroit, Michigan, U.S.
- Died: October 27, 2019 (aged 90) Detroit, Michigan, U.S.
- Party: Democratic
- Other political affiliations: Democratic Socialists of America
- Spouse: Monica Esters (m. 1990)
- Children: 2
- Relatives: Ian Conyers (grand-nephew)
- Education: Wayne State University (BA, LLB)

Military service
- Branch/service: United States Army
- Years of service: 1948–1950; 1950–1957
- Unit: Army National Guard
- Battles/wars: Korean War
- John Conyers's voice John Conyers introduces an amendment to the Y2K Act; Recorded May 12, 1999

John James Conyers Jr. (May 16, 1929 – October 27, 2019) was an American politician of the Democratic Party who served as a U.S. representative from Michigan from 1965 to 2017. Conyers was the sixth-longest serving member of Congress and the longest-serving African American member of Congress in history.

After serving in the Korean War, Conyers became active in the civil rights movement. He also served as an aide to Congressman John Dingell before winning election to the House in 1964. He co-founded the Congressional Black Caucus in 1969 and established a reputation as one of the most left-wing members of Congress. Conyers joined the Congressional Progressive Caucus after it was founded in 1991. Conyers supported creation of a single-payer healthcare system and sponsored the United States National Health Care Act. He also sponsored a bill to establish Martin Luther King Jr. Day as a federal holiday, and was the first congressperson to introduce legislation in support of reparations for the descendants of African American slavery.

Conyers ran for Mayor of Detroit in 1989 and 1993, but he was defeated in the primary both times. He served as the ranking Democratic member on the House Committee on the Judiciary from 1995 to 2007 and again from 2011 to 2017. He served as chairman of that committee from 2007 to 2011 and as chairman of the House Oversight Committee from 1989 to 1995. As the longest-serving current member of Congress, Conyers was the dean of the House of Representatives from 2015 to 2017. By November 2017, he was the last remaining member of Congress who had served since the presidency of Lyndon B. Johnson. In the wake of allegations that he had sexually harassed female staff members and secretly used taxpayer money to settle a harassment claim, Conyers resigned from Congress on December 5, 2017.

== Early life, education, and early career ==
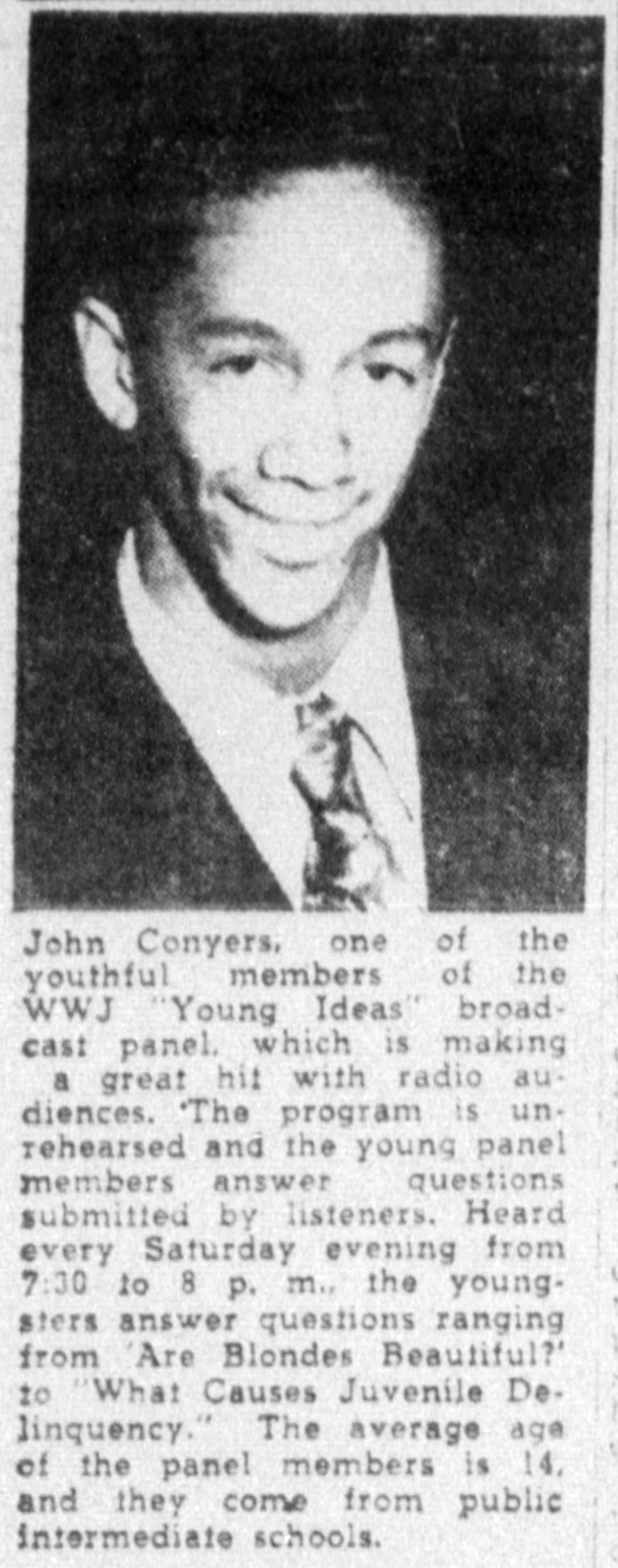
Conyers in the Detroit Tribune, February 1, 1947

Conyers was born and raised in Detroit, the son of Lucille Janice (Simpson) and John James Conyers, a labor leader. Among his siblings was younger brother William Conyers. After graduating from Northwestern High School, Conyers served in the Michigan National Guard from 1948 to 1950; the U.S. Army from 1950 to 1954; and the U.S. Army Reserves from 1954 to 1957. Conyers served for a year in Korea during the Korean War as an officer in the U.S. Army Corps of Engineers and was awarded combat and merit citations.

After his active military service, Conyers pursued a college education. He earned both his BA (1957) and LL.B. (1958) degrees from Wayne State University. After he was admitted to the bar, he worked on the staff of Congressman John Dingell. He also served as counsel to several Detroit-area labor union locals. From 1961 to 1963, he was a referee for Michigan's workmen's compensation department.

Conyers became one of the leaders of the civil rights movement. He was present in Selma, Alabama, on October 7, 1963, for the voter registration drive known as Freedom Day.

== U.S. House of Representatives ==
=== Elections ===
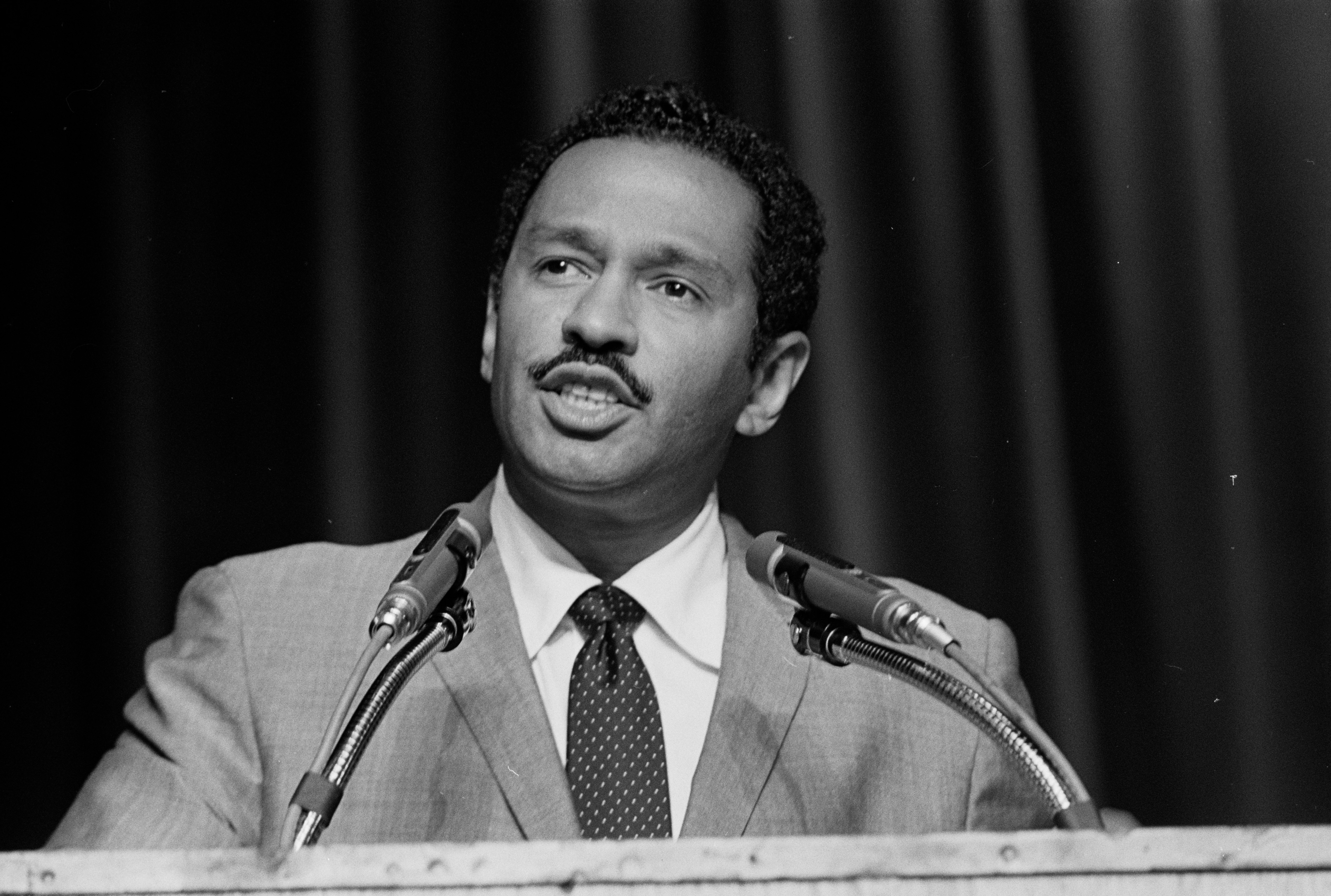
Conyers speaks at an anti-Safeguard Program rally in Madison Square Garden, June 25, 1969

In 1964, Conyers ran for an open seat in what was then the 1st District, and defeated Republican Robert Blackwell with 84% of the vote. He was reelected 13 times with even larger margins. After the 1990 United States census, Michigan lost a congressional district, and there was redistricting. Conyers's district was renumbered as the 14th district.

In 1992, Conyers won re-election to his 15th term in his new district, which included western suburbs of Detroit, with 82% of the vote against Republican nominee John Gordon. He won re-election another nine times after that. His worst re-election performance was in 2010, when he got 77% of the vote against Republican nominee Don Ukrainec. In 2013, his district was renamed as the 13th district.

In total, Conyers won re-election twenty-five times and was serving in his twenty-sixth term. He was the dean of the House as longest-serving current member, the third longest-serving member of the House in history, and the sixth longest-serving member of Congress in history. He was the second-longest serving member of either house of Congress in Michigan's history, trailing only his former boss, Dingell. He was also the last member of the large Democratic freshman class of 1964 who was still serving in the House.

In May 2014, Wayne County clerk Cathy Garrett determined that Conyers had not submitted enough valid nominating petition signatures to appear on the August 2014 primary election ballot. Two of his workers circulating petitions were not themselves registered voters at the time, which was required under Michigan law. But on May 23, federal district judge Matthew Leitman issued an injunction placing Conyers back on the ballot, ruling that the requirement that circulators be registered voters was similar to an Ohio law which had been found unconstitutional in 2008 by a Federal appeals court. The Michigan secretary of state's office subsequently announced they would not appeal the ruling.

=== Tenure ===
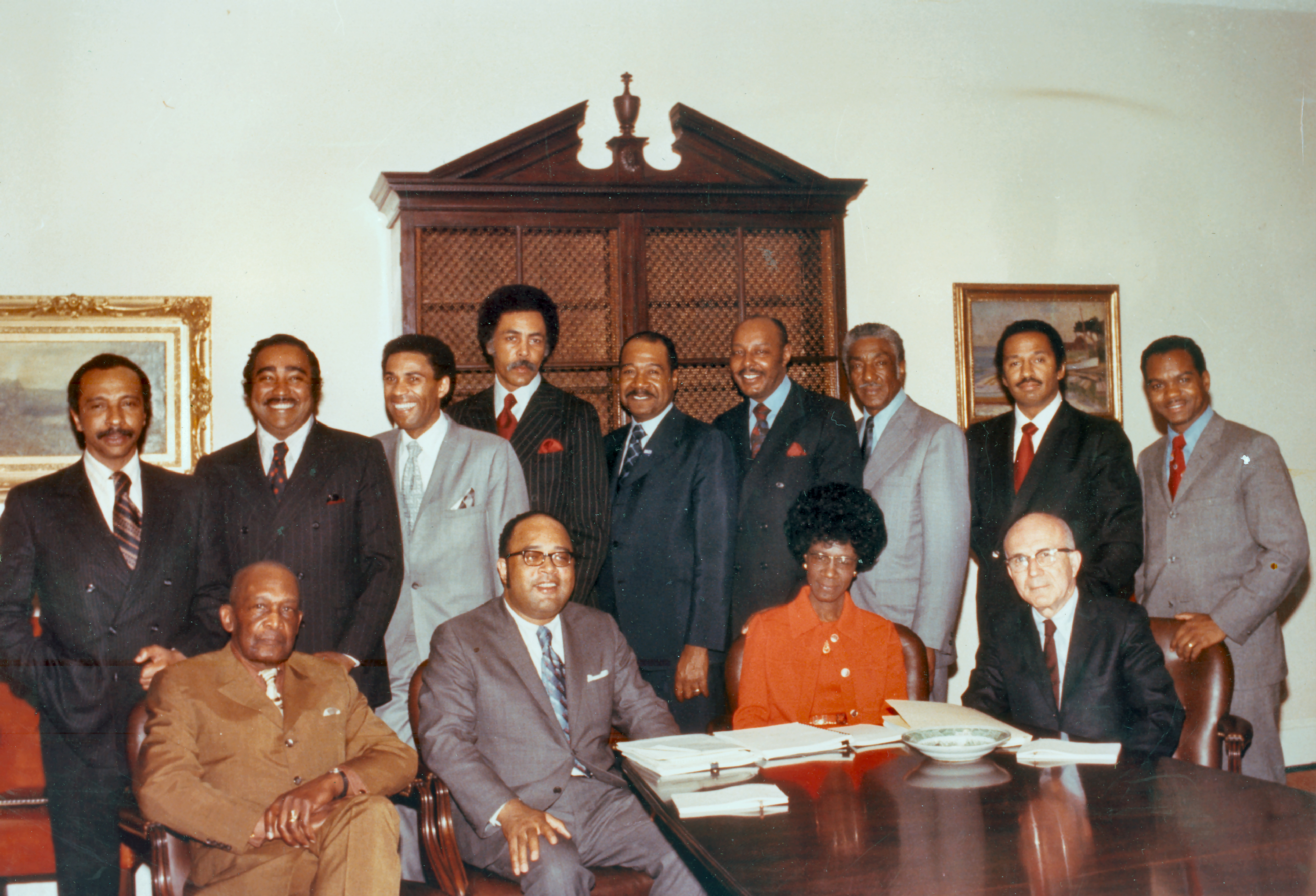
Conyers (standing, second from right) with fellow founding members of the Congressional Black Caucus in 1971

Conyers was one of the 13 founding members of the Congressional Black Caucus (CBC) and was considered the Dean of that group. Formed in 1969, the CBC was founded to strengthen African American lawmakers' ability to address the legislative concerns of Black and minority citizens. He served longer in Congress than any other African American. In 1971, he was one of the original members of Nixon's enemies list.

In 1965, Conyers won a seat as a freshman on the influential Judiciary Committee, which was then chaired by Democratic Congressman Emanuel Celler of New York. The assignment was considered an elite one, as Judiciary ranked behind only Ways and Means and Appropriations in terms of the number of Members who sought assignment there.

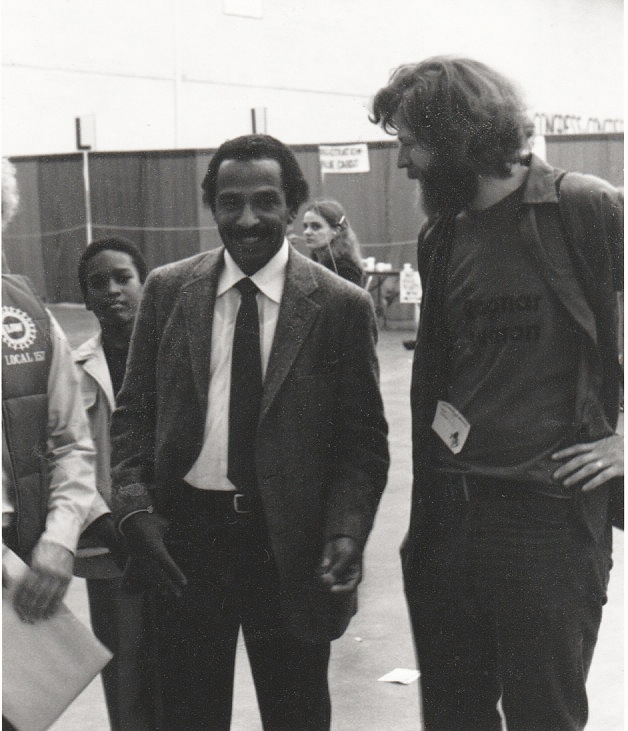
Conyers at the All People's Congress in Detroit, 1981

According to the National Journal, Conyers has been considered, with Pete Stark, John Lewis, Jim McDermott, and Barbara Lee, to be one of the most liberal members of Congress for many years. Rosa Parks, known for her prominent role in the Montgomery, Alabama bus boycott, moved to Detroit and served on Conyers's staff between 1965 and 1988.

Conyers was known to have opposed regulation of online gambling. He opposed the Unlawful Internet Gambling Enforcement Act of 2006. After the assassination of Martin Luther King Jr. in 1968, Conyers introduced the first bill in Congress to make King's birthday a federal holiday. He continued to propose legislation to establish the federal holiday in every session of Congress from 1968 to 1983, when Martin Luther King Jr. Day was finally signed into law by President Ronald Reagan.

In 1983 he joined with 7 other congressional representatives to sponsor a resolution to impeach Ronald Reagan over his sudden and unexpected invasion of Grenada.

According to The New Republic, Conyers was a member of the Democratic Socialists of America in 1983.

Conyers introduced the "Commission to Study Reparation Proposals for African Americans Act" (H.R. 3745) in January 1989. He re-introduced this bill each congressional term. It calls for establishing a commission to research the history of slavery in the United States and its effects on current society, which is to recommend ways to remedy this injustice against African Americans. The current version was introduced and referred to committee on January 3, 2013. Conyers first introduced the proposed resolution in 1989, and has stated his intention to annually propose this act until it is approved and passed. Since 1997, the bill has been designated "H.R. 40", most recently, H.R. 40, alluding to the promise of "forty acres and a mule". If passed, the commission would explore the longstanding effects of slavery on today's society, politics, and economy.

"My bill does four things: It acknowledges the fundamental injustice and inhumanity of slavery; It establishes a commission to study slavery, its subsequent racial and economic discrimination against freed slaves; It studies the impact of those forces on today's living African Americans; and the commission would then make recommendations to Congress on appropriate remedies to redress the harm inflicted on living African Americans."

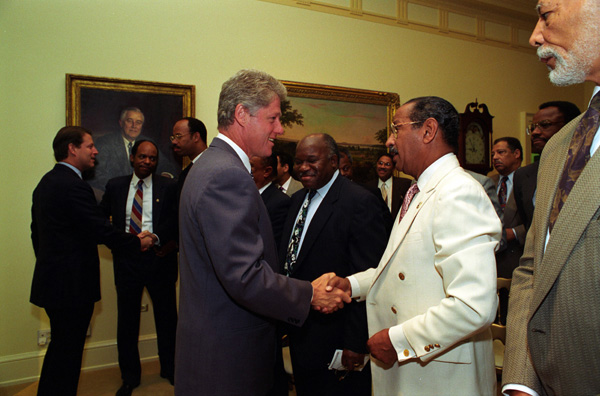
Conyers shaking hands with President Bill Clinton in 1993

Conyers served as the ranking Democratic member on the House Committee on the Judiciary from 1995 to 2007 and again from 2011 to 2017. He served as chairman of that committee from 2007 to 2011 and as chairman of the House Oversight Committee from 1989 to 1995. As the longest-serving current member of Congress, Conyers was the dean of the House of Representatives from 2015 to 2017.

In March 2016, Rep. Conyers and Representative Hank Johnson introduced legislation to protect consumers' access to civil courts. The bill was entitled the "Restoring Statutory Rights Act".

Conyers served more than 50 years in Congress, becoming the sixth-longest serving member of Congress in U.S. history; he was the longest-serving African American member of Congress. By November 2017, Conyers was the last remaining member of Congress who had served since the presidency of Lyndon B. Johnson.

=== Nixon and Watergate ===
Conyers was critical of President Richard Nixon during his tenure. He was listed as number 13 on President Nixon's enemies list during the president's 1969–74 presidential tenure. The president's chief counsel described him as "coming on fast", and said he was "emerging" as a "black anti-Nixon spokesman". Conyers, who voted to impeach Nixon in July 1974, wrote at the time,

My analysis of the evidence clearly reveals an Administration so trapped by its own war policy and a desire to remain in office that it entered into an almost unending series of plans for spying, burglary and wiretapping, inside this country and against its own citizens, and without precedent in American history.

=== National Health Care Act ===
In 2003, Conyers introduced H.R. 676, the United States National Health Insurance Act (Expanded and Improved Medicare for All Act) with 25 cosponsors and reintroduced it each session since. As of 2015, it had 49 cosponsors. The act calls for the creation of a universal single-payer health care system in the United States, in which the government would provide every resident health care free of charge. To eliminate disparate treatment between richer and poorer Americans, the Act would prohibit private insurers from covering any treatment or procedure already covered by the Act.

=== House impeachment manager in Hastings trial ===
Conyers was one of the House impeachment managers who prosecuted the in case the impeachment trial of Judge Alcee Hastings. Hastings was found guilty by the United States Senate and removed from his federal judgeship.

=== Downing Street memo ===
On May 5, 2005, Conyers and 88 other members of Congress wrote an open letter to the White House inquiring about the Downing Street memo. This was a leaked memorandum that revealed an apparent secret agreement between the Bush administration and the Second Blair ministry to invade Iraq in 2002. The Times, among the first to publish news of the leak, wrote that the discovered documented revealed the intentions of Bush and Blair to invade Iraq, along with revealing that the two had "discussed creating pretextual justifications for doing so."

The memo story broke in the United Kingdom, but did not receive much coverage in the United States. Conyers said: "This should not be allowed to fall down the memory hole during wall-to-wall coverage of the Michael Jackson trial and a runaway bride." Conyers and others reportedly considered sending a congressional investigation delegation to London.

=== What Went Wrong in Ohio ===
In May 2005, Conyers released a report about voting irregularities in the state of Ohio during the 2004 U.S. presidential election called What Went Wrong in Ohio: The Conyers Report On The 2004 Presidential Election. Some of the claims in the report pertaining to voter suppression tend to have been supported, including through court cases. Some of the claims pertaining to manipulation of the count and similar election fraud have been refuted. Consequently this report should be considered a representation of a minority view.

The report included the following claims:

- Too few voting machines in Kerry-voting wards, leading to long queues. A Washington Post piece exemplified Franklin County, where wards with many machines per voter mostly had Bush majorities, and wards with relatively few machines per voter were typically in favor of Kerry. The numbers disenfranchised statewide were in the tens of thousands or hundreds of thousands of voters.
- Ohio secretary of state Ken Blackwell made a decision to limit provisional ballots, leading to the estimated disenfranchisement of tens or hundreds of thousands of voters.
- Voter turnout for minorities was suppressed by caging targeting 35,000 of these voters, and "challenging" tactics were used to intimidate voters and cause longer lines.
- Where absentee ballots were not issued in time, provisional ballots were not permitted, affecting thousands or tens of thousands, especially seniors. The order from Ken Blackwell to do this was found illegal by a federal court, violating the Help America Vote Act.
- Improper voter purges and registration errors disenfranchised at least 10,000 voters, likely tens of thousands statewide.
- 93,000 spoiled ballots where no vote was cast for president, including undervote rates as high as 25% in some counties, from people who likely stood in line.
- Statistical abnormalities in the differences between exit poll results and actual votes registered at those locations.
- Issues of faulty electronic voting machines, such as over 24 electronic machines in Mahoning County transferring an indeterminate quantity of votes into the Bush column and out of the Kerry column.
- In Warren County, public observers were prevented from viewing the vote counting, due to specious claims that a terrorist threat had been called by the FBI. The FBI stated it gave no such warnings.
- Little-known third party candidates got twenty times more votes than would be expected in Cuyahoga County.
- Voter turnout of a suspiciously-high 98.55% in Miami County.
- Provisional ballots being rejected due to lack of guidance on how to process. In once case, about 8,000 of the 24,000 provisional ballots were rejected.
- Cheat sheets were handed out by a voting machine manufacturer to the election officials, giving guidance on how to avoid doing a hand-recount in the face of anomalies.

While some courts before the election found that certain restrictive voting policies of Ohio secretary of state Ken Blackwell were illegal, claims of voter and machine fraud swaying the election have not achieved mainstream acceptance, and several have been refuted.

Conyers was one of 31 members of the House who voted not to count the 20 electoral votes from Ohio in the 2004 presidential election. The state was won by Republican president George Bush by 118,457 votes.

=== Constitution in Crisis ===
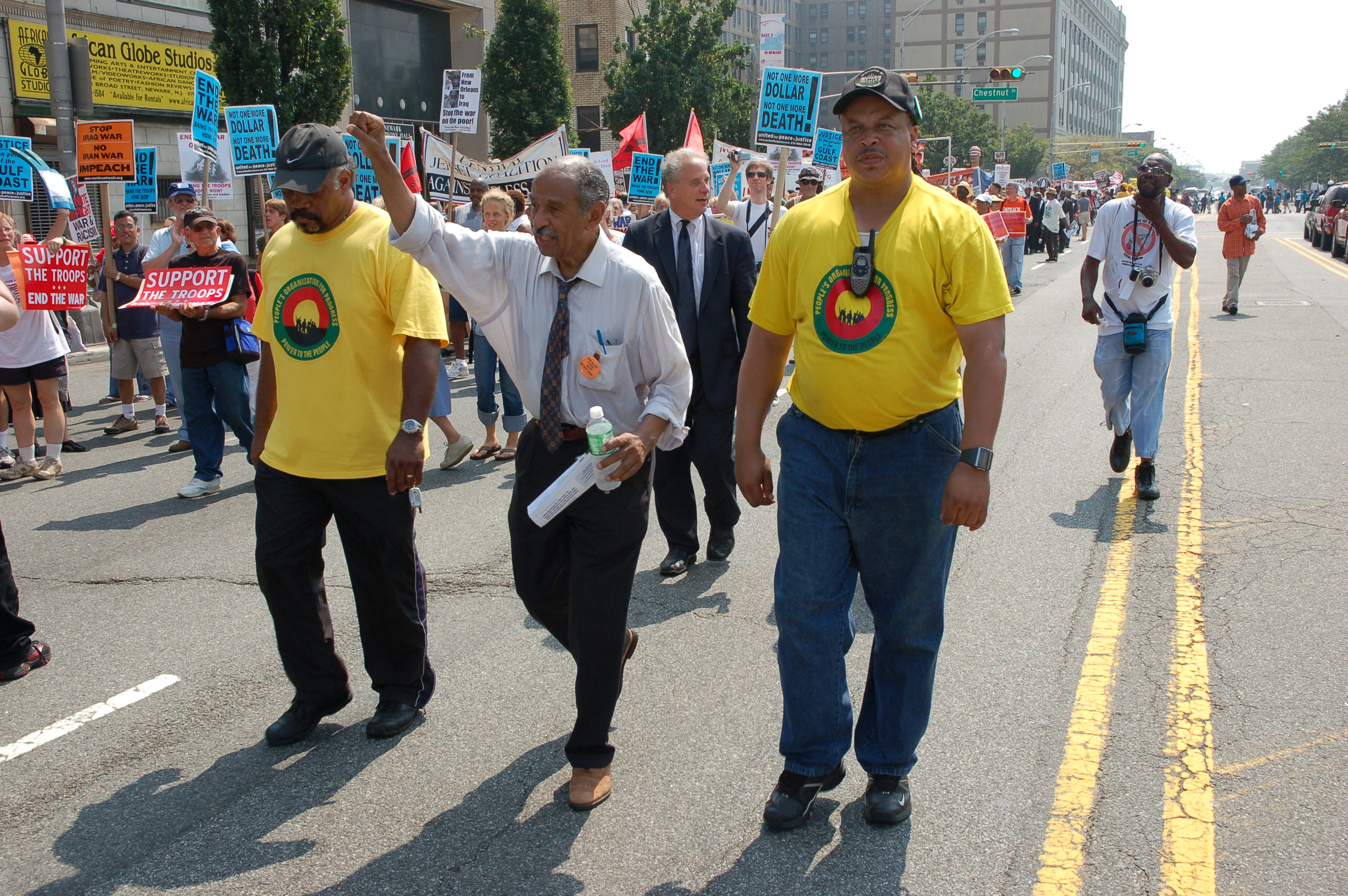
Conyers at an anti-war march in Newark, New Jersey, in 2007

On August 4, 2006, Conyers released his report, The Constitution in Crisis: The Downing Street Minutes and Deception, Manipulation, Torture, Retributions and Cover-ups in the Iraq War, an edited collection of information intended to serve as evidence that the Bush administration altered intelligence to justify the 2003 invasion of Iraq.

The Constitution in Crisis examines much of the evidence presented by the Bush administration prior to the invasion and questions the credibility of their sources of intelligence. In addition, the document investigates conditions that led to the torture scandal at Abu Ghraib prison in Iraq, as well as further evidence of torture having been committed but not made known to the public. Finally, the document reports on a series of "smear tactics" purportedly used by the administration in dealing with its political adversaries. The document calls for the censure of President George W. Bush and Vice President Dick Cheney. Conyers refused to back impeachment proceedings, however.

=== On anti-Muslim intolerance ===
In May 2005, Conyers proposed House Resolution 288, which condemns "religious intolerance" and emphasizes Islam as needing special protection from acts of violence and intolerance. It states that "it should never be official policy of the United States Government to disparage the Quran, Islam, or any religion in any way, shape, or form," and "calls upon local, State, and Federal authorities to work to prevent bias-motivated crimes and acts against all individuals, including those of the Islamic faith." The bill was referred to the House subcommittee on the Constitution in June 2005.

In 2005, Conyers introduced House Resolution 160, a house resolution that would have condemned the conduct of Narendra Modi, then the chief minister of the State of Gujarat in India. The resolution was cosponsored by Republican representative Joseph R. Pitts (Republican of Pennsylvania). The resolution's title was: "Condemning the conduct of Chief Minister Narendra Modi for his actions to incite religious persecution and urging the United States to condemn all violations of religious freedom in India." The resolution cited a 2004 United States Commission on International Religious Freedom report on Modi stating that he was "widely accused of being reluctant to bring the perpetrators of the killings of Muslims and non-Hindus to justice". (See 2002 Gujarat riots.) The resolution was not adopted.

=== Conyers v. Bush ===
In April 2006 Conyers, together with ten other senior congressmen, filed an action in the U.S. District Court in the Eastern District of Michigan, Southern Division, challenging the constitutionality of the Deficit Reduction Act of 2005. The complaint alleged the bill was not afforded due consideration by the United States Congress before being signed by the President. The action was subsequently dismissed on grounds of lack of standing.

=== Copyright bill ===
Conyers repeatedly introduced the Fair Copyright in Research Works Act, a bill that would overturn the NIH Public Access Policy, an open-access mandate of the National Institutes of Health. Conyers's bill would forbid the government from mandating that federally funded research be made freely available to the public. The legislation was supported by the publishing industry, and opposed by groups such as the Electronic Frontier Foundation. Writers Lawrence Lessig and Michael Eisen accused Conyers of being influenced by publishing houses, who have contributed significant money to his campaigns.

=== House Report on George W. Bush presidency and proposed inquiry ===
On January 13, 2009, the House Committee on the Judiciary, led by Conyers, released Reining in the Imperial Presidency: Lessons and Recommendations Relating to the Presidency of George W. Bush, a 486-page report detailing alleged abuses of power that occurred during the Bush administration, and a comprehensive set of recommendations to prevent recurrence. Conyers introduced a bill to set up a "truth commission" panel to investigate alleged policy abuses of the Bush administration.

=== Bill reading controversy ===
In late July 2009, Conyers, commenting on the healthcare debate in the House, stated: "I love these members, they get up and say, 'Read the bill' ... What good is reading the bill if it's a thousand pages and you don't have two days and two lawyers to find out what it means after you read the bill?" His remark brought criticism from government transparency advocates such as the Sunlight Foundation, which referred to readthebill.org in response.

=== Response to accusations regarding American Muslim spies ===
In October, Conyers responded to allegations from four Republican Congress Members, in the wake of the launch of the book Muslim Mafia, that the Council on American-Islamic Relations (CAIR) sought to plant Muslim "spies" in Capitol Hill. He strongly opposed the accusations, saying:

It shouldn't need to be said in 2009, and after the historic election of our first African-American president, but let me remind all my colleagues that patriotic Americans of all races, religions, and beliefs have the right – and the responsibility – to participate in our political process, including by volunteering to work in Congressional offices. Numerous Muslim-American interns have served the House ably and they deserve our appreciation and respect, not attacks on their character or patriotism.

=== WikiLeaks ===
At a December 16, 2010, hearing of the House Judiciary Committee on the subject of "the Espionage Act and the Legal and Constitutional Issues Raised by WikiLeaks", Conyers "argue[d] strongly against prosecuting WikiLeaks in haste – or at all." He strongly defended the whistleblowing organization, saying:

As an initial matter, there is no doubt that WikiLeaks is very unpopular right now. Many feel that the WikiLeaks publication was offensive. But being unpopular is not a crime, and publishing offensive information is not either. And the repeated calls from politicians, journalists, and other so-called experts crying out for criminal prosecutions or other extreme measures make me very uncomfortable. Indeed, when everyone in this town is joined together calling for someone's head, that is it a pretty strong sign we need to slow down and take a closer look. ... [L]et us not be hasty, and let us not legislate in a climate of fear or prejudice. For, in such an atmosphere, it is our constitutional freedoms and our cherished civil rights that are the first to be sacrificed in the false service of our national security.

Conyers's statement was "in marked contrast to the repeated calls from other members of Congress and Obama administration officials to prosecute WikiLeaks head Julian Assange immediately."

=== Foreign policy ===
In 2014, Conyers, along with Ted Yoho, introduced a bipartisan amendment to the National Defense Authorization Act which would prohibit the United States Armed Forces from providing any form of assistance to the Azov Battalion, a National Guard of Ukraine unit accused by Conyers of being a "far-right white supremacist militia". The amendment was subsequently passed by the House of Representatives in 2015. Conyers's decision to introduce the amendment was the subject of both praise and criticism, with detractors noting that claiming that large numbers of Neo-Nazis are members of the Azov Battalion is a common theme of propaganda in Russia.

Conyers stated, "If there's one simple lesson we can take away from U.S. involvement in conflicts overseas, it's this: Beware of unintended consequences. As was made vividly clear with U.S. involvement in Afghanistan during the Soviet invasion decades ago, overzealous military assistance or the hyper-weaponization of conflicts can have destabilizing consequences and ultimately undercut our own national interests." He also voiced concerns about sending anti-aircraft missiles to Syrian rebels.

=== Caucus memberships ===
- Founding Member and Dean of the Congressional Black Caucus
- American Sikh Congressional Caucus
- Congressional Progressive Caucus
- United States Congressional International Conservation Caucus
- Out of Afghanistan Caucus (Co-chair)
- Congressional Full Employment Caucus
- Congressional Arts Caucus
- Afterschool Caucuses
- Congressional NextGen 9-1-1 Caucus

== Detroit mayoral campaigns ==
While serving in the U.S. House, Conyers made two unsuccessful runs for mayor of Detroit: one in 1989 against incumbent Coleman Young and again in 1993.

=== 1989 ===
Incumbent Democratic mayor Coleman Young decided to run for a fifth term, despite growing unpopularity and the declining economy of Detroit. In the September primary, Young won with 51% of the vote. Accountant Tom Barrow qualified for the November run-off by having 24%, and Conyers received 18% of the vote. Despite the difficulties of the city, Young defeated Barrow in the run-off with 56% of the vote.

=== 1993 ===
In June 1993, incumbent Democratic mayor Coleman Young decided to retire instead of seeking a sixth term, citing his age and health. Many observers believed he had decided not to test his growing unpopularity. In a Detroit News poll in February, 81% said Young should retire. Conyers was one of the 23 candidates who qualified for ballot access.

Dennis Archer was the front runner in the mayoral campaign from the beginning. The 51-year-old former state supreme court justice raised over $1.6 million to finance his campaign. He won the September primary with 54% of the vote. Conyers came in fourth place. Archer won the November election.

== Controversies ==
=== Ethics controversy ===
In April 2006, the FBI and the U.S. attorney's office sent independent letters to the House Ethics Committee, saying two former aides of Conyers had alleged that Conyers used his staff to work on several local and state campaigns of other politicians – including his wife – for the Detroit City Council. (She won a seat in 2005.) He also forced them to baby-sit and chauffeur his children.

In late December 2006, Conyers "accepted responsibility" for violating House rules. A statement issued December 29, 2006, by the House Ethics Committee chairman Doc Hastings and ranking minority member Howard Berman, said Conyers acknowledged what he characterized as a "lack of clarity" in his communications with staff members regarding their official duties and responsibilities, and accepted responsibility for his actions.

In deciding to drop the matter, Hastings and Berman said:

After reviewing the information gathered during the inquiry, and in light of Representative Conyers's cooperation with the inquiry, we have concluded that this matter should be resolved through the issuance of this public statement and the agreement by Representative Conyers to take a number of additional, significant steps to ensure that his office complies with all rules and standards regarding campaign and personal work by congressional staff.

=== Sexual harassment allegations and resignation ===
In 2015, a former employee of Conyers alleged that he had sexually harassed her and dismissed her. She filed an affidavit with the Congressional Office of Compliance. Conyers had entered into a confidentiality agreement with the former employee and had paid her a $27,000 (~$35,784 in 2025) settlement from his publicly funded office budget in 2015. BuzzFeed reported on the allegations and settlement on November 20, 2017; Buzzfeed also reported allegations that Conyers "repeatedly made sexual advances to female staff," caressed female staffers' hands in a sexual manner, and rubbed their backs and legs in public.

On November 21, 2017, Conyers issued a statement in which he said, "In our country, we strive to honor this fundamental principle that all are entitled to due process. In this case, I expressly and vehemently denied the allegations made against me, and continue to do so. My office resolved the allegations – with an express denial of liability – in order to save all involved from the rigors of protracted litigation."

Also on November 21, 2017, the House Ethics Committee launched an investigation into multiple sexual harassment allegations against Conyers.

On November 22, 2017, The Washington Post reported that Melanie Sloan, founder of Citizens for Responsibility and Ethics in Washington (CREW), publicly accused Conyers of having harassed and verbally abused her during her tenure working for the House Judiciary Committee. On one occasion, Sloan alleged that Conyers had summoned her to his office, where she found him sitting in his underwear; she quickly departed.

Later in November 2017, there were reports that another woman accused Conyers of sexual harassment. House minority leader Nancy Pelosi, who had initially stated that Conyers was an "icon" and had done a great deal to protect women, called upon Conyers to resign. She said the allegations against him were "very credible".

On December 5, 2017, aged 88, Conyers resigned his House seat because of his mounting sexual scandals. The announcement came the day after another former staffer released an affidavit accusing Conyers of sexual harassment. The same day, an article by The Washington Post published allegations by Courtney Morse that Conyers had threatened her with a similar fate to that of Chandra Levy, a staffer found murdered in a park in Washington, DC. She said that after she rejected his advances, he "said he had insider information on the case. I don't know if he meant it to be threatening, but I took it that way."

At a time when the MeToo movement was pushing for action against men who harassed women, some media and supporters in Detroit believed Conyers had been unfairly treated. He was reported as the "first sitting politician to be ousted from office in the wake of the #MeToo movement."

=== Mental Decline ===
Starting in 2014, Michigan political commentators began noting his seeming declining mental faculties, describing him as unfit to hold office and "not quite right." Politico reported that some members of the Congressional Black Caucus believe Conyers's declining health and mental acuity exacerbated the sexual harassment controversies. After his death, the Detroit News editorial page described Conyers as suffering from "declining health and mental lapses, making him far less a congressional force than he was in his early years."

== Personal life ==
Conyers married Monica Esters, a teacher in Detroit, in 1990. She was 25 and he was 61; they had two sons together, John James III and Carl Edward Conyers. Monica Conyers served as vice administrator of Detroit's public schools, and in 2005 was elected to the Detroit City Council. Monica Conyers pleaded guilty to bribery charges on June 26, 2009 and served slightly more than 27 months in prison; her sentence was completed on May 16, 2013. In September 2015, Monica Conyers filed for divorce, citing a "breakdown of the marriage". However, the couple reconciled in late 2016.

Conyers's grandnephew, Ian Conyers, was elected to the Michigan Senate in 2016. He generated controversy by telling of Conyers's planned retirement in interviews before the congressman announced it himself, and claiming his great-uncle's endorsement. Following the congressman's resignation, Ian Conyers announced that he would run in the special election for the congressman's seat. The congressman instead endorsed his son, John Conyers III, as his successor. John Conyers III chose not to run. Ian Conyers was defeated in the Democratic primary by Rashida Tlaib.

== Death ==
Conyers died at his home in Detroit on October 27, 2019, at the age of 90. He lay in state on November 2 and November 3 at the Charles H. Wright Museum of African American History. His funeral was held on November 4 at Detroit's Greater Grace Temple, with Michael Eric Dyson and former U.S. president Bill Clinton joining his family in providing eulogies. Rev. Jesse Jackson and Michigan governor Gretchen Whitmer, and various members of the U.S. Congress spoke at the funeral as well.

== Accolades ==
In 2007, Conyers was awarded the Spingarn Medal from the NAACP.

== See also ==
- History of African Americans in Detroit
- List of African-American United States representatives
- List of Democratic Socialists of America who have held office in the United States
- PRO-IP Act
- United States National Health Care Act

== Notes and references ==
U.S. House of Representatives
Preceded by Lucien Nedzi	Member of the U.S. House of Representatives from Michigan's 1st congressional district 1965–1993	Succeeded by Bart Stupak
Preceded by Dennis Hertel	Member of the U.S. House of Representatives from Michigan's 14th congressional district 1993–2013	Succeeded by Gary Peters
Preceded by Hansen Clarke	Member of the U.S. House of Representatives from Michigan's 13th congressional district 2013–2017	Succeeded by Brenda Jones
Preceded by Jack Brooks	Chair of the House Oversight Committee; 1989–1995	Succeeded by William F. Clinger Jr.
Preceded by Jim Sensenbrenner	Chair of the House Judiciary Committee; 2007–2011	Succeeded by Lamar S. Smith
Honorary titles
Preceded by John Dingell	Dean of the United States House of Representatives; 2015–2017	Succeeded by Don Young
Preceded by John Dingell	Most senior Democrat in the U.S. House of Representatives; 2015–2017	Succeeded by Steny Hoyer
Preceded by Ralph Hall	Oldest member of the U.S. House of Representatives; 2015–2017	Succeeded by Louise Slaughter
