= Serials crisis =

Problem of cost increases of academic serial publications

The term serials crisis describes the problem of rising subscription costs of serial publications, especially scholarly journals, outpacing academic institutions' library budgets and limiting their ability to meet researchers' needs. The prices of these institutional or library subscriptions have been rising much faster than inflation for several decades, while the funds available to the libraries have remained static or have declined in real terms. As a result, academic and research libraries have regularly canceled serial subscriptions to accommodate price increases of the remaining subscriptions. The increased prices have also led to the increased popularity of shadow libraries.

== Causes ==
=== Price inelasticity ===
Each journal article reports unique research findings, and as a result, each article is a unique commodity, that cannot be replaced in an academic library collection by another article. The same uniqueness applies to journals, which are collections of articles.

This unique combination of non-replaceable demand and copyright monopoly leads to the type of price inelasticity not found in other fields, and allows each academic publisher to act as a monopolist, despite the presence of numerous other publishers on the market.

=== Publishers ===
Another possible set of factors in this situation includes the increasing domination of scholarly communication by a small number of commercial publishers, whose journals are far more costly than those of most non-profit academic societies. However, the institutional subscription prices for journals published by some academic society publishers (see below) have also exhibited inflationary patterns similar to those seen among commercial publishers.

The earnings of the American Chemical Society (ACS), for example, is based in large parts on publications. In 1999, the income of the ACS was $349 million, where $250 million came from information services. According to a 2004 House of Commons report (by the Science and Technology Committee), the ACS is one of the driving forces of the STM (science, technology, medicine) serials crisis. According to the same report the crisis started around 1990 when many universities and libraries complained about the dramatic inflation of STM subscription prices especially for the flagship Journal of the American Chemical Society, which is exclusively sold as a bundle with all other ACS journals. The report further states that:

the no–cancellation clauses attached to their multi-year multi-journal deals with Elsevier and the American Chemical Society had led to uneven cancellation of titles to make the budget balance. The result is that the little-used Elsevier and ACS titles must remain in the portfolio while the more popular titles by other publishers are cancelled.

Every year the Library Journal publishes a summary of periodical pricing and inflation. According to its 2019 price survey, "The rate of price increase is analyzed for more than 18,000 e-journal packages handled by EBSCO Information Services...For 2019, the average rate of increase over two years was 5.5%, up slightly from 5% in 2018."

=== Profitability ===
A 2021 study found that the cost of publishing a journal article to publishers varies from $200 (in a large-scale platform with a post-publication review) to $1,000 (in a prestigious journal with an acceptance rate under 10%), with $400 per article being the average cost. Also, when the number of published articles in a journal (such as a mega-journal) exceeds 1000, the fixed costs become less than 1% of the direct costs, and the marginal cost of publishing more articles is very small. At the same time, the revenue for most subscription journals is about $4,000 per article. That study estimated the average profit margin of academic journal publishers at approximately 55%.

In a free market, such a high profit margin should have attracted numerous competing publishers. However, in a traditional publishing market, each research article is unique, and the consumer (reader or subscriber) cannot substitute one article (or journal) for another. Instead, the competition occurs on the authors' side: authors have a choice, of where to publish. In an open access publishing model, the market forces are appropriately balanced.

=== Growth in scholarly publishing ===
An additional problem is a dramatic increase in the volume of research literature and increasing specialization of that research, i.e. the creation of academic subfields. This includes a growth in the number of scholars and an increase in potential demand for these journals. At the same time, funds available to purchase journals are often decreasing in real terms. Libraries have seen their collection budgets decline in real terms compared to the United States Periodical Price Index. As a result of the increasing cost of journals, academic libraries have reduced their expenditures on other types of publications such as scholarly monographs.

=== Exchange rates ===
Currency exchange rates can serve to increase the fluctuation over the short run of subscription prices throughout the world. For example, journal publishers in Europe often set their prices in Euro not United States Dollars, so subscribers in the United States will experience varying prices due to exchange rate fluctuations. The converse is true for European institutions who subscribe to journals published in the United States. As the United States and Europe publish the vast majority of scholarly journals, libraries in other regions are subject to ever greater uncertainty. Although exchange rates can go down as well as up, long-term trends in currency values can lead to chronic price inflation experienced by particular libraries or collections.

== Response ==
There is much discussion among case librarians and scholars about the crisis and how to address its consequences. Academic and research libraries are resorting to several tactics to contain costs while maintaining as much access to the latest scholarly research for their users as possible. These include increasingly borrowing journals from one another (see interlibrary loan), purchasing single articles from commercial document suppliers instead of subscribing to whole journals, cancelling subscriptions to the least used or least cost-effective journals, encouraging various methods of obtaining free access to journals, of which black open access provided by Sci-Hub became the most successful, and converting from printed to electronic copies of journals; however, publishers sometimes charge more for the online edition of a journal, and price increases for online journals have followed the same inflationary pattern as have journals in paper format.

Many individual libraries have joined co-operative consortia that negotiate license terms for journal subscriptions on behalf of their member institutions.

=== Unbundling big deals ===
A subscription to a bundle of several journals at a discounted price is known as a "big deal". In a big deal a library or consortium of libraries typically pays several million dollars per year to subscribe to hundreds or thousands of toll access journals. By offering such discounted bundled subscriptions, the largest journal publishers were able to squeeze out of the market smaller (often, non-profit and less expensive) publishers, who did not have many journal titles and could not offer a discounted bundle subscription.

In the 2010s, efforts increased to "unwrap" or "unbundle" the subscription, if not to cancel them altogether. Services emerged for libraries to share information and reduce the information asymmetry in negotiations with the publishers, like the Scholarly Publishing and Academic Resources Coalition (SPARC) cancellation tracking and the Unsub data analysis tool.

=== Open access ===
Developed in part as a response to the serials crisis, open access models have included new models of financing scholarly journals that may serve to reduce the monopoly power of scholarly journal publishers which is considered a contributing factor to the creation of the serials crisis. These include open access journals and open access repositories.

== See also ==
- Academic journal publishing reform
- List of public domain resources behind a paywall
- Library and information science
- Elsevier § Criticism and controversies
  - The Cost of Knowledge
- United States v. Swartz
