= NIH Public Access Policy =

Open access mandate

The NIH Public Access Policy is an open access mandate, drafted in 2004 and mandated in 2008, requiring that research papers describing research funded by the National Institutes of Health must be available to the public free through PubMed Central upon publication. PubMed Central is the self-archiving repository in which authors or their publishers deposit their publications. Copyright is retained by the usual holders, but authors may submit papers with one of the Creative Commons licenses.

== Description ==
The NIH Public Access Policy applies Division G, Title II, Section 218 of PL 110-161 (Consolidated Appropriations Act, 2008) which states:

The Director of the National Institutes of Health shall require that all investigators funded by the NIH submit or have submitted for them to the National Library of Medicine's PubMed Central an electronic version of their final, peer-reviewed manuscripts upon acceptance for publication, to be made publicly available no later than 12 months after the official date of publication: Provided, that the NIH shall implement the public access policy in a manner consistent with copyright law.

The policy was initially implemented by the NIH as a voluntary policy in 2004. In 2008, the policy was made mandatory by law in Division G, Title II, Section 218 of PL 110-161 (Consolidated Appropriations Act, 2008). Deposit was then mandated on January 11, 2008, effective April 7, 2008.

The right to delay submission for 12 months was removed by the 2024 NIH Public Access Policy. Papers "must be submitted to PubMed Central for public availability without embargo upon the official date of publication."

=== Applicability ===
The work must be:

1. Peer reviewed

2. Published or approved for publication by a journal on or after April 7, 2008

3. "And, arises from:

- Any direct funding from an NIH grant or cooperative agreement active in Fiscal Year 2008 or beyond, or;
- Any direct funding from an NIH contract signed on or after April 7, 2008, or;
- Any direct funding from the NIH Intramural Program, or;
- An NIH employee"

=== Compliance ===
Authors hold copyright in their work, and are responsible for making sure that in any agreement with a publisher they keep the right to give PubMed Central a non-exclusive license to make a copy of the paper available. Journals with agreements with NIH submit final published versions of papers. For other publishers, authors are required to submit papers when they are accepted for publication. The NIH grant holder is responsible for ensuring this. The author, publisher, or institution continues to hold the copyright as usual. The author may choose to include the article in the Open Access Subset by using one of the Creative Commons licenses.

Publishers may require that "public access" be delayed up to 12 months after publication. Only the author's final draft needs to be published, not any contributions made by the publisher. PubMed Central is the designated repository for papers submitted in accordance with the NIH Public Access Policy and for those that fall under similar policies from other funding agencies.

By April 2014, the NIH had increased enforcement of compliance with its Public Access Policy by delaying continuing grant payments for noncompliance.

== Public Access Compliance Monitor ==
The Public Access Compliance Monitor (PACM or "compliance monitor") is a service from the National Library of Medicine that helps users at NIH-funded institutions locate and track the compliance of funded papers with the NIH Public Access Policy at an institutional level. Authorized members of an institution can get a quick snapshot of their institution's compliance rate or help researchers achieve compliance.

PACM provides users with a list of all PubMed citations associated with an institution's NIH funding and classifies the articles according to compliance status (i.e., Compliant, Non-Compliant, In Process). The compliance monitor also provides detailed information about each article including:

- a full citation including the PMID (PubMed ID) and link to the PubMed record
- associated grants and principal investigators
- NIHMSID (NIH Manuscript Submission Reference Number), where available
- PMCID (PubMed Central ID), where available
- key names and dates in the NIHMS, where available
- article compliance status
- method A status
- journal publisher

Compliance reports can be downloaded from these lists and the data filtered based on an institution's needs.

== Response ==
Peter Suber described the policy as "the first open access mandate for a major public funding agency in the United States; it is also the first one for a public funding agency anywhere in the world that was demanded by the national legislature rather than initiated and adopted independently by the agency."

In the first few years after the policy was introduced, there were two major legislative efforts to reverse it, primarily driven by some publishers' objections. According to Patrick Ross, the director of the Copyright Alliance: "The mere fact that a scientist accepts as part of her funding a federal grant should not enable the federal government to commandeer the resulting research paper and treat it as a public domain work." The Fair Copyright in Research Works Act was a bill sponsored by John Conyers in 2008 and 2009 that sought to reverse the NIH policy. It failed to leave committee either year. In 2011 the Research Works Act was introduced to end the policy. It died after protests from the academic community and science publisher Elsevier's withdrawal of support.

In 2013 a survey of persons receiving NIH funding and therefore subject to the NIH Public Access policy reported that among 94 respondents, 30% had little understanding of the NIH Public Access Policy and all but two of them said that they accepted the default terms of their copyright forms "as is".

== See also ==
- PubMed Central
