= Scholarly Publishing and Academic Resources Coalition =

Collection of research libraries promoting open access

- Abbreviation: SPARC
- Formation: 1998; 28 years ago
- Purpose: Open access publishing
- Headquarters: Washington, D.C., U.S.
- Official language: English
- Leader: Heather Joseph
- Subsidiaries: Alliance for Taxpayer Access; Coalition of Open Access Policy Institutions
- Affiliations: SPARC Europe; SPARC Japan; SPARC Africa
- Website: sparcopen.org sparceurope.org

The Scholarly Publishing and Academic Resources Coalition (SPARC) is an international alliance of academic and research libraries developed by the Association of Research Libraries in 1998 which promotes open access to scholarship. The coalition currently includes some 800 institutions in North America, Europe, Japan, China, Africa and Australia.

Richard Johnson served as director 1998–2005. Heather Joseph became executive director in 2005.

== History ==
A video released by SPARC in support of Access2Research, a 2012 petition for open-access mandates in the USA.

The idea of SPARC was presented at the 1997 annual meeting of the Association of Research Libraries. Kenneth Frazier, librarian at the University of Wisconsin, proposed that attendees at the meeting develop a fund to create a new publication model for academic journals wherein many libraries contributed to that fund, and from that fund, the contributors would create new publications on some model which lowered the costs of all journals. As founding director, Rick Johnson led the establishment of SPARC in 2002 as a result of so many librarians expressing the desire for reform.

Logo of SPARC Europe

SPARC Europe was established with LIBER in 2001. David Prosser became director in 2002.

Starting in 2006 the SPARC Innovators Award has been given semi-annually to recognize an individual, institution, or group exemplifying SPARC principles.

SPARC has established itself as an international alliance of academic and research libraries working "to correct imbalances in the scholarly publishing system". Its focus is to stimulate the emergence of new scholarly communication models that expand the dissemination of scholarly research and reduce financial pressures on libraries. Action by SPARC in collaboration with stakeholders – including authors, publishers, and libraries – builds on the opportunities created by the networked digital environment to advance the conduct of scholarship. Leading academic organizations have endorsed SPARC. SPARC Europe Seal for Open Access Journals offers certification for journals choosing the CC-BY license (Creative Commons) and provide the Directory of Open Access Journals (DOAJ) with metadata on article level.

== SPARC Author Addendum ==
SPARC publishes an addendum which authors may use to negotiate with academic publishers. The form provides a templated request by authors to add to the copyright transfer agreement which the publisher sends to the author upon acceptance of their work for publication. Authors which use the form typically retain the rights to use their own work without restriction, receive attribution, and to self-archive. The form gives the publisher the right to obtain a non-exclusive right to distribute a work for profit and to receive attribution as the journal of first publication.

== See also ==
- Open Access Scholarly Publishers Association, of which SPARC Europe is a founding member
- Open Access
- Open educational resources policy
- Library publishing
- Open Access Movement in India
