= Fair Copyright in Research Works Act =

Law in Public access

Legislation History
- Bill Name: H.R. 801
- Alternate names: Conyers Bill
- Submitted to: United States 111th Congress
- Published on: February 3, 2009
- Introduced by: Representative John Conyers (D-MI14)

Committee Assignments
- Committee: House Committee on the Judiciary
- Sub-committee: Subcommittee on Courts and Competition Policy

Status
- Pending

Related Legislation
- H.R. 6845

The Fair Copyright in Research Works Act (Bill H.R 801 IH , also known as the "Conyers Bill") was submitted as a direct response to the National Institutes of Health (NIH) Public Access Policy; intending to reverse it.

The bill's alternate name relates it to U.S Representative John Conyers (D-MI), who introduced it at the 111th United States Congress on February 3, 2009.

The initiative of the bill is to amend Title 17 of the United States Code with respect to works associated with specific funding agreements. It would ultimately prohibit federal agencies from placing any conditions for copyright transfer on funding agreements; effectively making the current NIH policy illegal.

== Background - Related statutory laws and policies ==
Title 17 of the United States Code is the title that outlines United States copyright law. Sections 106 – on the exclusive rights in copyrighted works – and 201 – on copyright ownership and transfer of ownership – are both referenced in H.R.801. The amendment it proposes would be in reference to funding agreements in the scope of those segment of the title.

The NIH Public Access Policy is a policy which mandates that articles reporting research funded by the National Institutes of Health must be made available to the public for free through PubMed Central within 12 months of publication.

== The proposed statute ==
H.R.801: The Fair Copyright in Research Works Act would, specifically, amend Sections 201 (d) and (e) of Title 17 of the United States Code – which pertain to the transfer of copyright ownership.

The code would be amended by way of adding limitations on the Federal Government, with regard to funding agreements – i.e. "a contract, grant, or other agreement entered into between a Federal agency and any person under which funds are provided by a Federal agency, in whole or in part, for the performance of experimental, developmental, or research activities" – on extrinsic works – i.e. "any work, other than a work of the United States Government, that is based upon, derived from, or related to, a funding agreement" which represents or stems from the value or process of one or more non-federal and non-party affiliated entities – who have "funded [it] in substantial part".

The bill states that:

1. On the transfer of copyright ownership:

- The exclusive rights granted by sections 106 (3), (4), and (5) of the code, would be set as reasons to prohibit Federal agencies from imposing terms or conditions that demand any such transfer.
  - The rights outlined in section 106 (1) and (2), in an extrinsic work, would also keep them from setting stipulations of the like "to the extent that, the [rights involve] the availability to the public of that work"
  - Any terms requiring "the absence or abandonment of any right described in subclause (I) or (II) of clause (i) in an extrinsic work" are also disallowed.

2. Federal agencies are also prohibited from imposing or facilitating terms that may result in the approval or waiver of any of the previously stated bans, for a funding agreement.

3. Federal agencies may not apply any of the rights granted by Title 17 in an extrinsic work, to material developed under a funding agreement that may "restrain or limit the acquisition or exercise of [said rights]."

== Provisions of the bill ==
=== Conditions ===
The law would only be applicable in the event that:

- It is not interpreted in a way that compromises "the rights provided to the copyright owner under paragraphs (1) and (2) of section 106"
- "No new copyright material is created" − i.e. "nothing in this subsection provides copyright protection to any subject matter that is not protected under section 102"
- The funding agreement requiring its application has been "entered into on or after the date of the enactment of this act"

=== Process ===
- Report to Congressional Committees shall be made no later than 5 years after the date the act is ratified.
- After conducting the necessary research, the Register of Copyrights will

"review and submit to the appropriate congressional committees a report on [its] views on section 201(f) of title 17, United States Code,
as added by subsection (a) of this section, taking into account the development of and access to extrinsic works and materials developed
under funding agreements, including the role played by publishers in the private sector and others"

== H.R.801's legislative history ==
As of March 16, 2009 H.R.801 has been referred to the House Committee on the Judiciary, which has in turn referred it to the Subcommittee on Courts and Competition Policy.

This bill has not become law. Sessions of Congress last two years, at the end of which all proposed bills and resolutions that have not been passed are removed. Members may and often do reintroduce bills that did not come up for debate.

An exact replica of this bill (H.R. 6845.IH) was first introduced in the 110th Congress, where it died.

== Reception ==
=== Initial reactions ===
The bill has been the topic of numerous articles, in online civic and scholarly publications. Its supporters are predominantly professional associations and publishing houses, while the opposition includes library associations and educational institutions.

=== Support ===
Groups, including the Association of American Publishers (AAP), support Conyers' bill, as they feel that the NIH Policy "infringes on their business rights, insofar as it grants the public a right to this publicly funded work". In December 2008, the AAP contacted President Barack Obama voicing concerns that "the NIH mandate severely diminishes both the market and copyright protection for these copyrighted works to which not-for-profit and commercial publishers have made significant value-added contributions".

=== Criticism ===
One of the concerns regarding this bill is the possibility that average Americans will lose access to medical research, that the NIH Public Access Policy grants them. The Association of Research Libraries, the Alliance for Taxpayer Access, and a coalition of patients' rights organizations, are among numerous critics of the act. Academic institutions including Harvard University, Cornell University, and Earlham College are openly supporting the NIH Public Access Policy and opposing Conyers' Bill along with their respective libraries, also stressing the importance of public access to biomedical research and results. Cornell University claims to be affected as the NIH is one of the components of the Department of Health and Human Services (DHHS), "the largest funder of research at Cornell. According to the Office of the Vice Provost of Research, the DHHS accounted for more than 50 percent of federally sponsored research – or over $190 million per fiscal year – in both 2007 and 2008". Their Libraries view the bill as a threat to the "state-of-the-art digital repository where research can be preserved," that the policy provides and a potential loss of acquired research due to the bill's prohibition of copyright transfer from author to publisher.
