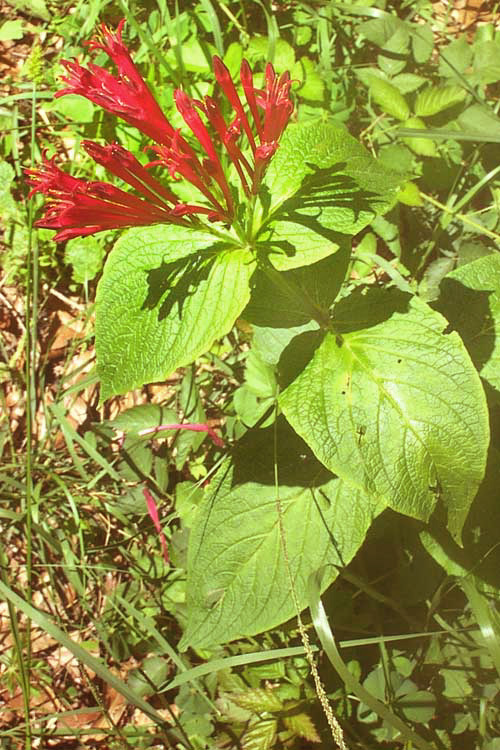
- Spigelia longiflora in habitat

Scientific classification
- Kingdom: Plantae
- Clade: Embryophytes
- Clade: Tracheophytes
- Clade: Spermatophytes
- Clade: Angiosperms
- Clade: Eudicots
- Clade: Asterids
- Order: Gentianales
- Family: Loganiaceae
- Genus: Spigelia
- Species: S. longiflora

Binomial name
- Spigelia longiflora M.Martens & Galeotti

Synonyms
- Spigelia longiflora (Kunth) F.Dietr.

= Spigelia longiflora =

Species of plant

Spigelia longiflora, with no commonly used English name, is an attractive species of wildflower endemic to Mexico. It belongs to the mostly tropical family Loganiaceae.

== Description ==
Here are distinctive features of Spigelia longiflora:

- Herbaceous, hairy stems are up to 80 cm (31 in) tall.
- Leaves with no petioles arise in pairs opposite one another. Blades tend to be widest below their middles and tapered to a sharp point, with margins lacking teeth, lobes or indentations. Blades are up to 17.5 cm (7 in) long and about half that wide.
- Branched inflorescences at stem tips bear 5-15 flowers on each branch, which curves outward and downward. Flowers alternately arise on different sides of each branch rachis and bend upward; such inflorescences are "scorpioid cymes."
- Flowers have narrow sepals up to 9.5 mm (3/8 in) long and slender red corollas up to 5.5 cm (2 in) long with corolla lobes up to 1 cm (1/2 in) in length. Five stamens extend beyond the corolla tube.
- Fruits are somewhat roundish, 2-lobed capsules up to 8.5 mm (3/8 in) in diameter, each fruit bearing the persisting lower part of the style, which is longer than the capsule.

== Taxonomy ==
In 1844, Spigelia longiflora was formally named and described by Martin Martens and Henri Guillaume Galeotti from a collection made by Galeotti near Real del Monte, now named Mineral del Monte, in Hidalgo state, at 6,500 ft (2,000 m) feet in elevation.

=== Etymology ===
The genus name Spigelia honors Adriaan van den Spiegel.

The species epithet longiflora is Latin for 'long flowers'.

== Distribution ==
Spigelia longiflora is endemic just to the central Mexican states of Guanajuato, Guerrero, Hidalgo, Puebla, Querétaro, San Luis Potosí, and Veracruz. Possibly a disjunct population turns up in Jalisco state as well.

== Habitat ==
Spigelia longiflora inhabits conifer and oak forests, cloud forests, and secondary vegetation associated with each forest type, as well as scrub at elevations between 1,100–2,900 m (3,600–9,500 ft).

== Conservation status ==
Spigelia longiflora occurs regularly over an area of suitable habitat (AOO) of 50,000 km^{2} (19,000 sq mi), so is not considered under any type of threat.

== As a poisonous plant ==
In Mexico Spigelia longiflora is used as a pesticide. In an 1894 classic book on Mexican medicine it is reported that in Hidalgo state, since very remote times, the plant has been used to kill certain animals. Animals of large size are said to die quickly by ingesting not very large quantities of the fresh plant. Smaller animals such as dogs and rabbits died in early laboratory experiments after ingesting less than a cubic centimeter of plant extract. Despite such reports, and knowing that the species contains active ingredients such as the toxic alkaloid spigeline, in traditional medicine the root is used to increase peristaltic movements, thus serving as an anthelmintic and purgative.
