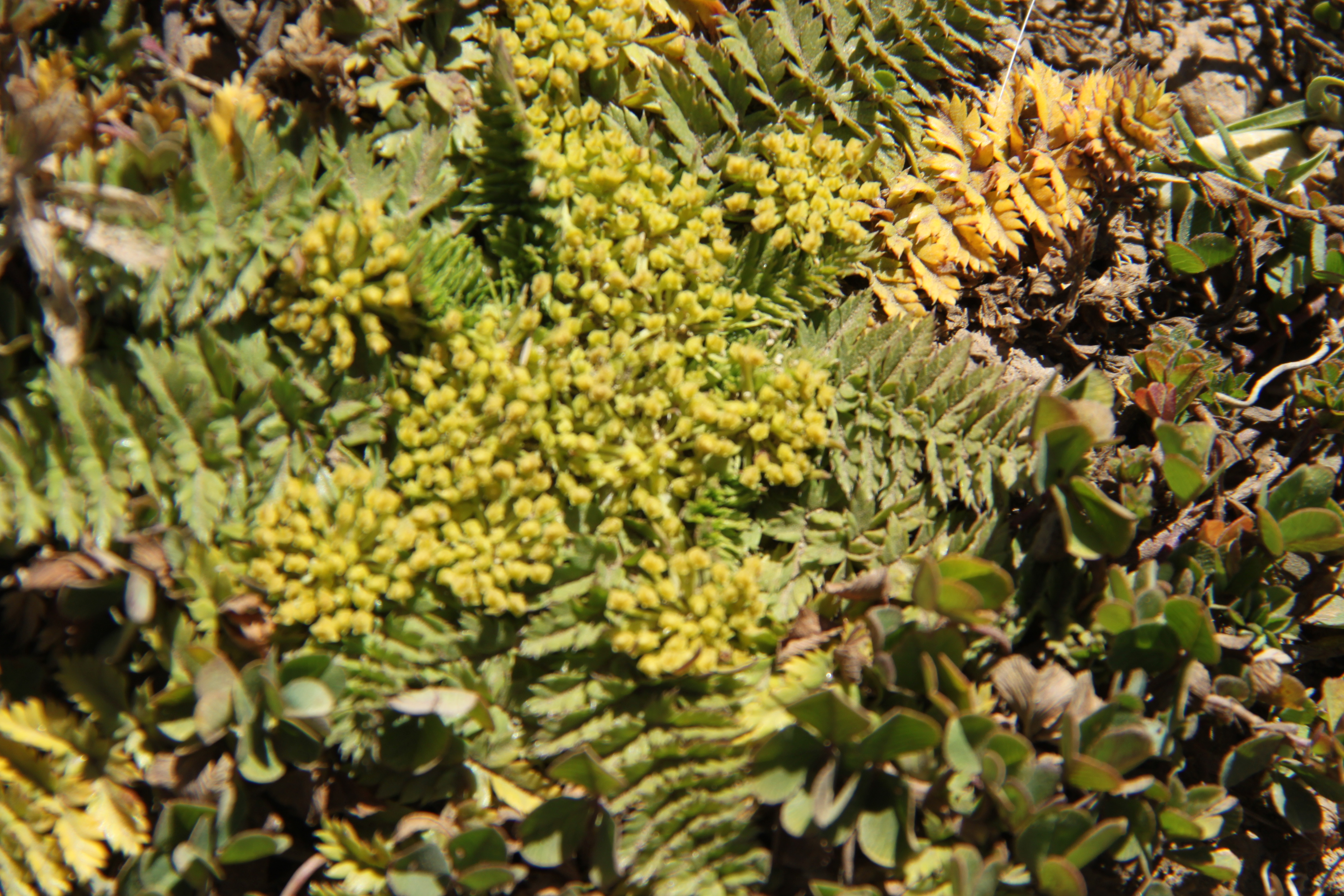

Scientific classification
- Kingdom: Plantae
- Clade: Tracheophytes
- Clade: Angiosperms
- Clade: Eudicots
- Clade: Asterids
- Order: Apiales
- Family: Apiaceae
- Genus: Haplosciadium; Hochst.
- Species: H. abyssinicum

Binomial name
- Haplosciadium abyssinicum Hochst.

= Haplosciadium =

Genus of flowering plants

Haplosciadium is a monotypic genus of flowering plants in the family Apiaceae (Umbelliferae). Its only species is Haplosciadium abyssinicum. It is a flat rosette plant endemic to the Afro-alpine zones on East African mountains, occurring on moist valley bottoms above 3,500 metres (11,500 ft). It engages in geocarpy as an adaptation to living on frost-heaved soils.
