= Spigelia elbakyaniae =

Scientific classification
- Kingdom: Plantae
- Clade: Embryophytes
- Clade: Tracheophytes
- Clade: Angiosperms
- Clade: Eudicots
- Clade: Asterids
- Order: Gentianales
- Family: Loganiaceae
- Genus: Spigelia
- Species: S. elbakyaniae

Binomial name
- Spigelia elbakyaniae S.Islas & L.O.Alvarado

Species of flowering plant

Spigelia elbakyaniae (also spelled Spigelia elbakyanii) is a species of flowering plant in the family Loganiaceae. It is an annual plant with papery leaves and white flowers. The species is native to Oaxaca, Mexico.

Spigelia elbakyaniae was described in 2020, and is named after Alexandra Elbakyan.

== Taxonomy ==
The species was originally published as Spigelia elbakyanii in 2020, by Sofia Islas-Hernández and Leonardo Osvaldo Alvarado-Cárdenas. The type specimen was collected from Santa María Chimalapa in 1995.

== Distribution ==
Spigelia elbakyaniae is native to the wet tropical biome of Oaxaca, in southern Mexico. The species grows in montane cloud forests, at elevations of around 990 metres (3,250 ft).

== Description ==
Spigelia elbakyaniae is an annual herb that grows to around 20 centimetres (7.9 in) high. The leaves are arranged oppositely, and grow on 0.5–1.5 centimetres (0.20–0.59 in) stems. The leaves are papery, lanceolate, 5.7–6.8 centimetres (2.2–2.7 in) long, and 3.2–4.4 centimetres (1.3–1.7 in) wide.

The inflorescence is a scorpioid cyme, with a stem around 1.6 centimetres (0.63 in) long. Each inflorescence has eleven flowers, which lack stems. The calyx has lanceolate green lobes. The corolla is white with purple lines, funnel-shaped, and 1.3–1.6 centimetres (0.51–0.63 in) long. The corolla has lobes, which are around 2.5 millimetres (0.098 in) long, and around 2.9 millimetres (0.11 in) wide. The plant flowers in March.

Spigelia elbakyaniae is similar to Spigelia humboldtiana and Spigelia anthelmia.

== Etymology ==
Spigelia elbakyaniae is named after Alexandra Elbakyan, the founder of Sci-Hub. The name was originally published as Spigelia elbakyanii, but the spelling was amended, as species epithets dedicated to women are correctly ended with "-iae".
