= Indian pink =

Indian pink refers to several different wildflowers in the United States:

- Lobelia, a genus in the family Campanulaceae
- Silene, a genus in the family Caryophyllaceae
- Spigelia marilandica, a perennial ornamental plant in the family Loganiaceae
