= Linea semilunaris =

Line near the edge of the rectus muscles

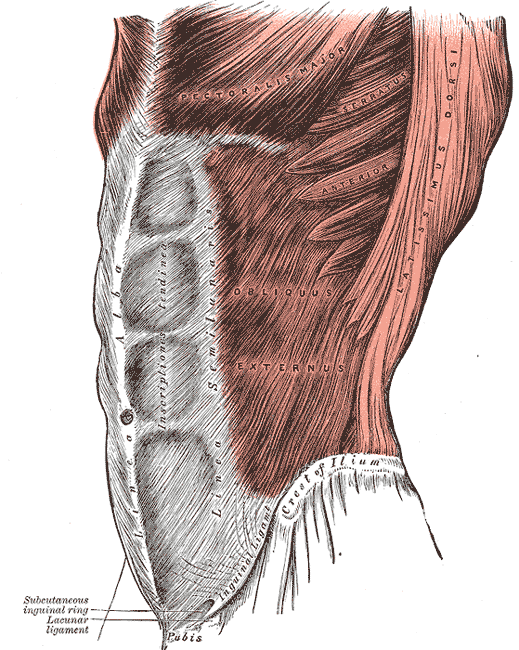
- The obliquus externus abdominis. (Linea semilunaris labeled vertically at center, at border between brown and gray.)

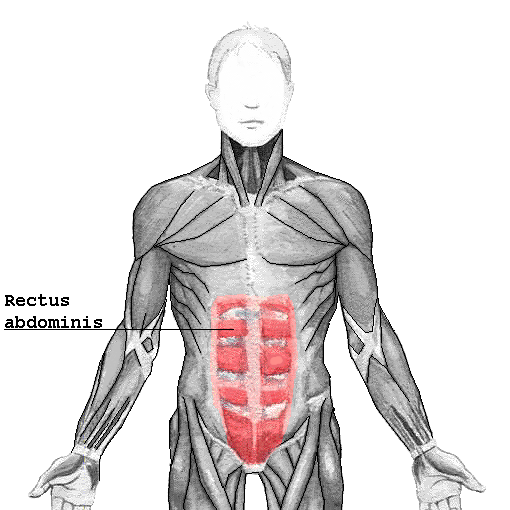
- Linea semilunares are at lateral borders of rectus abdominis.

Identifiers
- TA98: A04.5.01.025
- TA2: 2380
- FMA: 19929

The linea semilunaris (also semilunar line or Spigelian line) is a curved line found on either side of the rectus abdominis muscle.

== History ==
The linea semilunaris was first described by Adriaan van den Spiegel.

== Structure ==
There are two commonly used definitions identifying the linea semilunaris. The first is defined as corresponding with the lateral border of the rectus sheath. In this definition, it is formed by the aponeurosis of the internal oblique at its line of division to enclose the rectus. This is reinforced anteriorly by the external oblique, and posteriorly by the transversus abdominis above the arcuate line. The second definition identifies it as the line forming and marking the transition from muscle to aponeurosis in the transversus abdominis muscle, known as the spigelian aponeurosis. In both definitions, it extends from the cartilage of the ninth rib to the pubic tubercle. The terms spigelian fascia and spigelian aponeurosis have also been used to define the linea semulunaris. In this definition it refers to the aponeuroses of the lateral abdominal muscles lateral to the rectus muscle. In other definitions the spigelian aponeurosis/spigelian fascia is the aponeurosis of the transverse abdominal muscle medial to the linea semilunaris and lateral to the rectus muscle.

== Clinical significance ==
A hernia through the linea semilunaris is called a Spigelian hernia. This usually occurs at the meeting point of the linea semilunaris with the arcuate line and the lateral border of the rectus abdominis muscle.
