= Spigelian hernia =

Surgical condition

- Other names: Lateral ventral hernia
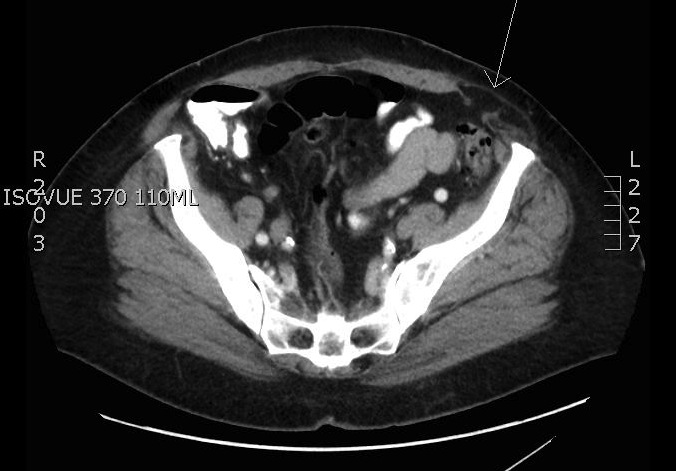
- Transverse CT image of the abdomen in a patient with a Spigelian hernia (arrow).
- Specialty: General surgery

A Spigelian hernia is the type of ventral hernia that occurs through the Spigelian fascia, which is the part of the aponeurosis of the transverse abdominal muscle bounded by the linea semilunaris (or Spigelian line) laterally and the lateral edge of the rectus abdominis muscle medially.

It is the protuberance of omentum, adipose tissue, or bowel in that weak space between the abdominal wall muscles, that ultimately pushes the intestines or superficial fatty tissue through a hole causing a defect. As a result, it creates the movement of an organ or a loop of intestine in the weakened body space that it is not supposed to be in. It is at this separation (aponeurosis) in the ventral abdominal region, that herniation most commonly occurs.

Spigelian hernias are rare compared to other types of hernias because they do not develop under abdominal layers of fat but between fascia tissue that connects to muscle. The Spigelian hernia is generally smaller in diameter, typically measuring 1–2 cm., and the risk of tissue becoming strangulated is high.

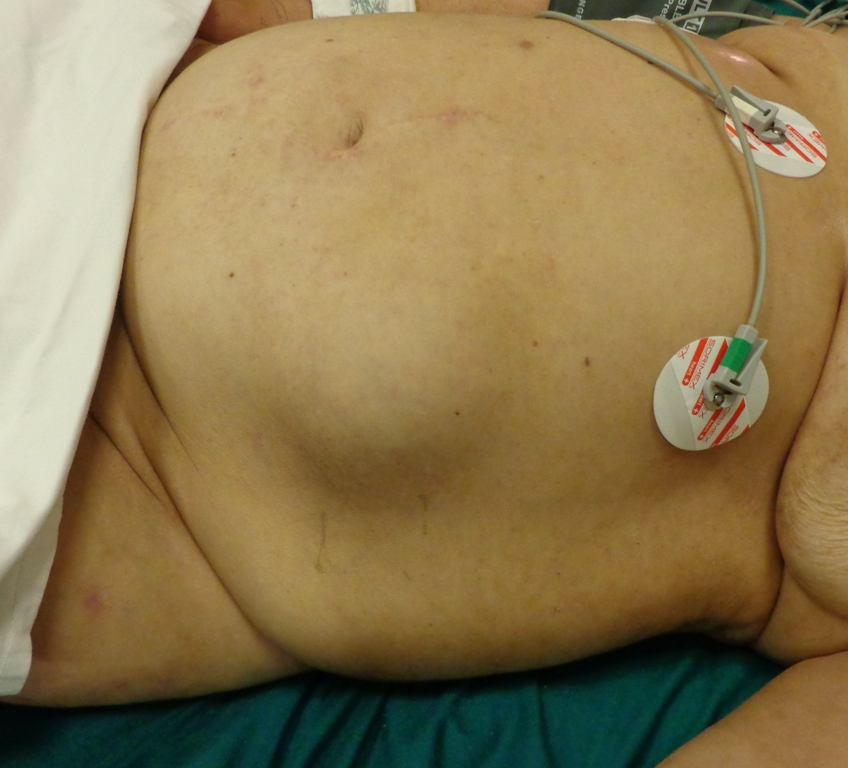
Left Spigelian hernia

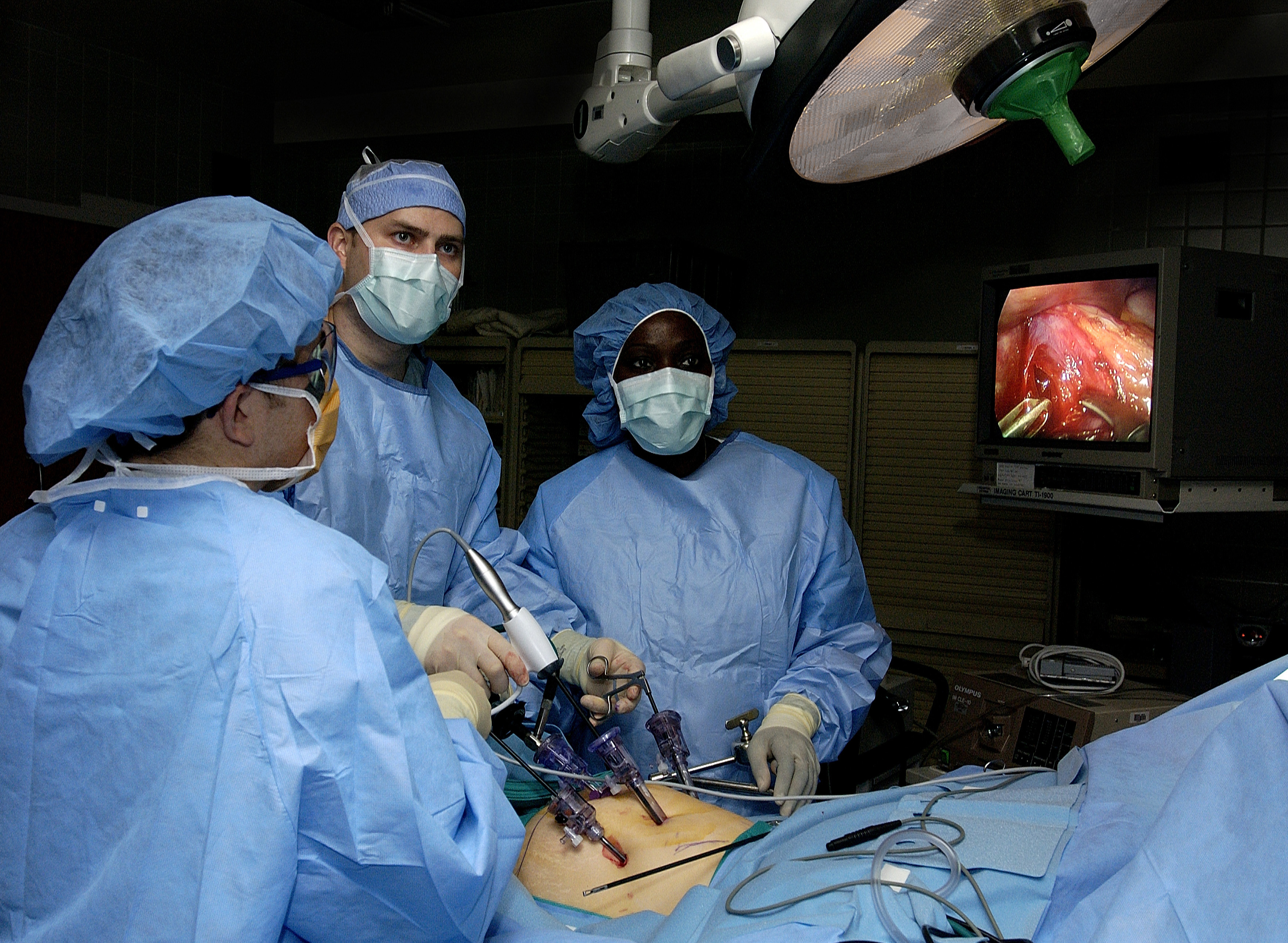
Laparoscopic Hernia Surgery

== Signs and symptoms ==
Individuals typically present with either intermittent pain, a lump or mass, all which are classic signs of a bowel obstruction. The patient may have a protuberance when standing in an upright position although discomfort can sometimes be confused by its anatomical region for a peptic ulceration. The bulge may be painful when the patient stretches but then goes away when they are lying down in a resting position. However, a number of patients present with no obvious symptoms but vague tenderness along the area in which the Spigelian fascia is located.

== Diagnosis ==
Ultrasound Imaging or a CT scan will provide better imaging for the detection of a hernia than an X-ray. The ultrasound probe should move from lateral to medially, a hypoechoic mass should appear anteriorly and medially to the inferior epigastric artery during Valsalva maneuver. The diagnosis of a Spigelian hernia is traditionally difficult if only given a history and physical examination. People who are good candidates for elective Spigelian hernia surgery, after receiving an initial diagnostic consultation by a licensed medical professional, will be advised to see a physician to schedule surgery.

== Treatment ==
The Spigelian hernia can be repaired by either an open procedure or laparoscopic surgery because of the high risk of strangulation. Surgery is straightforward, with only larger defects requiring a mesh prosthesis. In contrast to the laparoscopic intraperitoneal onlay mesh plan of action there is a significant higher risk associated with complications and recurrence rates during the period following a surgical operation. A Spigelian hernia becomes immediately operative once the risk of incarceration is confirmed. Today, a Spigelian hernia can be repaired by doing robotic laparoscopy and most patients are discharged on the same day. This novel, uncomplicated approach to small Spigelian hernias combines the benefits of laparoscopic localization, reduction, and closure without the morbidity and cost associated with foreign material. Mesh-free laparoscopic suture repair is an uncomplicated approach to small Spigelian hernias combined with the benefits of a closure without the anguish and cost associated with foreign material.

== Eponym ==
Adriaan van den Spiegel was an anatomist at the University of Padua during the 17th century. He became a professor of surgery in 1619 and was the first to describe this rare hernia in 1627. The history of the Spigelian hernia was acknowledged in 1645, twenty years after Spiegel's death. In 1764, almost a century later, the Flemish anatomist, Josef Klinkosch, was acknowledged for recognizing and describing a hernia located in the Spigelian fascia, and coined the term Spigelian hernia.

== Raveenthiran syndrome ==
Raveenthiran described a new syndrome in which Spigelian hernia and cryptorchidism (undescended testis) occur together. Some common complications of this distinct syndrome cryptorchidism are testicular torsion, and its link to testicular cancer.
