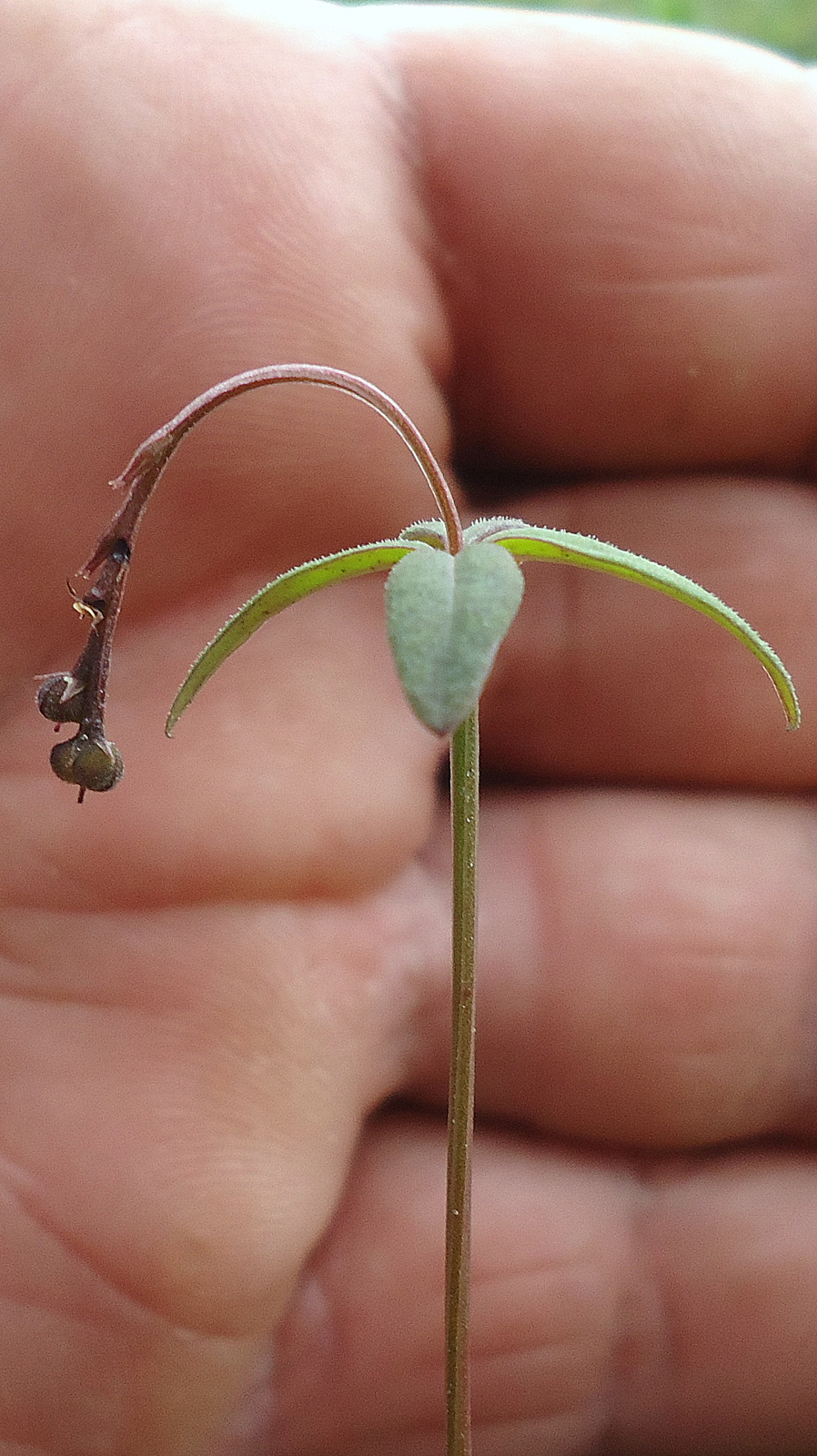
- Tall form

Scientific classification
- Kingdom: Plantae
- Clade: Tracheophytes
- Clade: Angiosperms
- Clade: Eudicots
- Clade: Asterids
- Order: Gentianales
- Family: Loganiaceae
- Genus: Spigelia
- Species: S. genuflexa

Binomial name
- Spigelia genuflexa Popovkin & Struwe

= Spigelia genuflexa =

Species of herb

Spigelia genuflexa is a species of annual herb of the family Loganiaceae from Bahia state, Brazil, which was described in 2011. It is unusual in that the stems bend down after flowering to deposit the seeds in the soil (geocarpy).

== Description ==
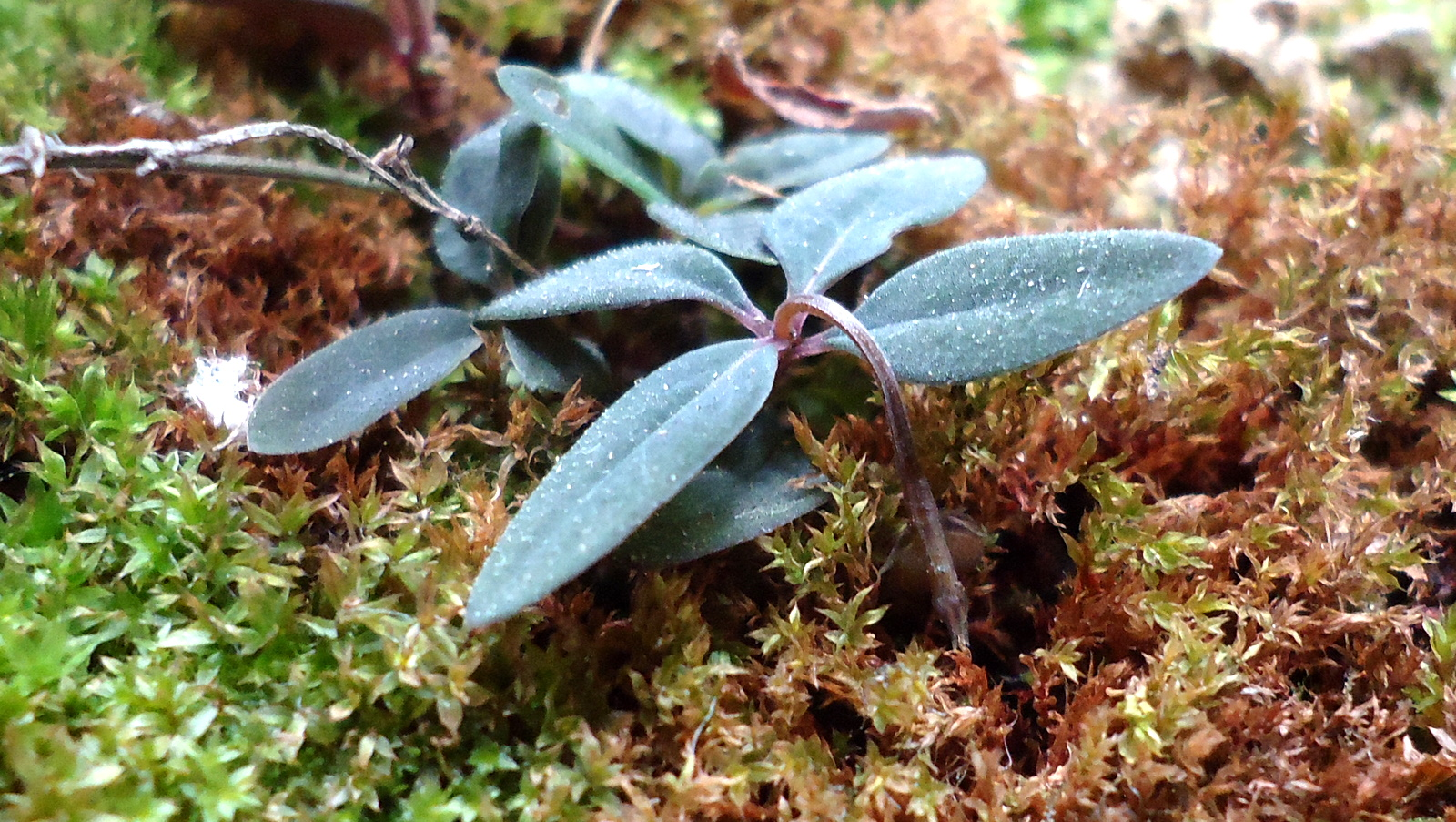
The short form of S. genuflexa in fruit, showing the geocarpy that gives it its name

Spigelia genuflexa shows two growth forms. In one, inflorescences are produced after the first three pairs of leaves, when the plant is around 1 centimetre (0.4 in) tall; in the other, four or five pairs of leaves precede the inflorescence, by which time the plant is 10–25 cm (4–10 in) tall. The leaves are oppositely arranged, 6–20 mm (0.24–0.79 in) long and 2–5 mm (0.08–0.20 in) wide, and elliptic to ovate in shape. The inflorescences are composed of up to 7 flowers, and the corollas of the flowers are 4–8 mm (0.16–0.31 in) long. The stems are somewhat red-coloured, and have 4 to 6 prominent ribs running down from the leaf bases.

== Ecology ==
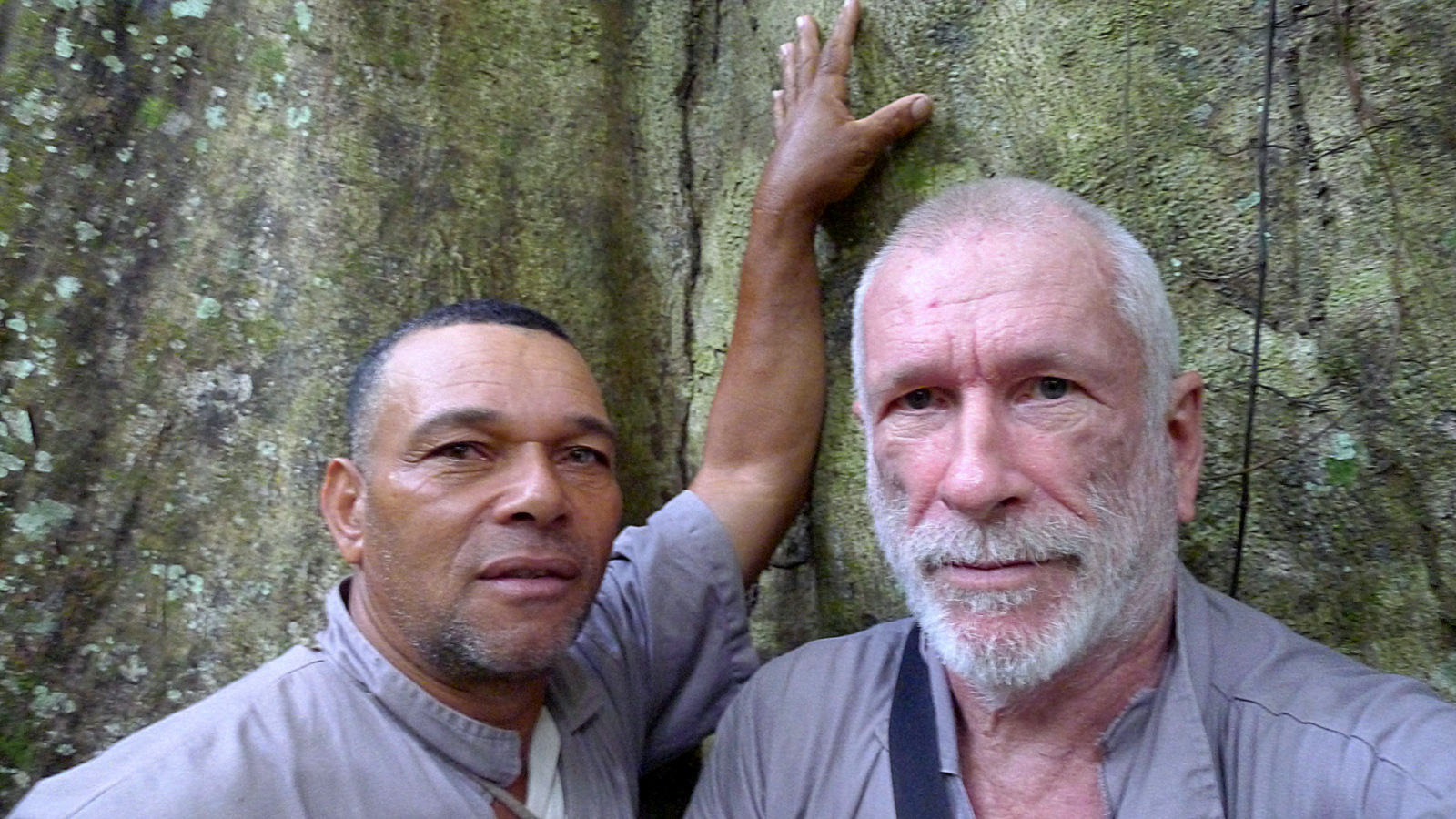
Amateur botanists Mendes Santos and Alex Popovkin in 2014

Spigelia genuflexa grows in residual stands of Atlantic forest in the Rio do Negro valley in Bahia state (12°1′S 38°2′W), at an altitude of 150 metres (490 ft), and about 30 kilometres (19 mi) from the Atlantic coast. It flowers during the rainy season, and almost disappears during the dry season. It is able to self-pollinate, with anthesis lasting less than a day. After pollination, the plant stem bends, and in the lower growth form, deposits the seeds in the soil; the taller growth form remains some distance above the soil surface.

== Taxonomy ==
Spigelia genuflexa was discovered on land owned by Alex Popovkin in 2009, by Popovkin's "house help" José Carlos Mendes Santos. The specific epithet genuflexa is a reference to the plant's tendency to bend down after flowering, from the Latin genuflexus (cf. genuflexion). The authors proposed that the species should be listed as Data Deficient according to the criteria of the IUCN Red List. Popovkin is a Russian emigre and amateur botanist who has fulfilled a long-held dream to study plants in the tropics. It is one of sixty species which make up the poorly-studied Neotropical genus Spigelia, but does not appear particularly close to any other species.
