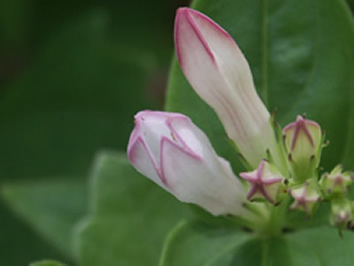

Conservation status
- Critically Imperiled (NatureServe)

Scientific classification
- Kingdom: Plantae
- Clade: Tracheophytes
- Clade: Angiosperms
- Clade: Eudicots
- Clade: Asterids
- Order: Gentianales
- Family: Loganiaceae
- Genus: Spigelia
- Species: S. gentianoides

Binomial name
- Spigelia gentianoides Chapm. ex A.DC.

= Spigelia gentianoides =

Species of plant

Spigelia gentianoides is a rare species of flowering plant in the Loganiaceae known by the common names purpleflower pinkroot and gentian pinkroot. It is native to Alabama and Florida in the United States, where a few small populations remain. It is threatened by the loss and degradation of its habitat, and is a federally listed endangered species of the United States.

This perennial herb produces a slender, erect, red-tinged stem up to about 30 centimeters tall from a rhizome. The oppositely arranged leaves are up to 5 centimeters long by 2 wide. The inflorescence is a raceme of flowers atop the stem. Each flower has a tubular pink corolla up to 3 centimeters long with five triangular lobes. Blooming generally occurs in May through July, but plants can be seen in flower between April and October.

Spigelia gentianoides grows in wooded areas dominated by trees such as loblolly pine (Pinus taeda), longleaf pine (Pinus palustris), water oak (Quercus nigra), laurel oak (Quercus hemisphaerica), southern red oak (Quercus falcata), and black tupelo (Nyssa sylvatica). It also occurs in dolomite glades in Alabama.

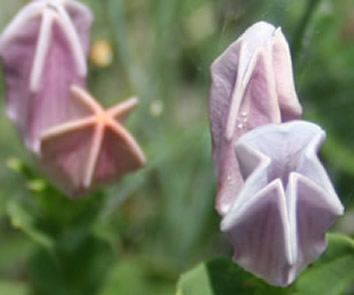
The Alabama variety (S. gentianoides var. alabamensis)

There are two varieties of S. gentianoides. The Alabama variety, var. alabamensis, is limited to Bibb County. It grows at the Bibb County Glades, which has the highest level of biodiversity of any area in the state of Alabama. The var. gentianoides occurs in southern Alabama and the Florida Panhandle. There are five populations remaining, the largest two occurring in Jackson County. The third largest is located in the Geneva State Forest in Alabama. The two varieties differ mainly in the shape of the flower, with var. alabamensis flowers opening up and var. gentianoides flowers remaining more tubular at peak flower maturity.

Threats to this plant include logging, fire suppression, and overcollection. Silviculture is a threat, as land is cleared for pine plantations. At the Alabama glades the plant is threatened by quarrying.

Controlled burns have been found to increase the abundance of the plant, but if fires are too frequent the plant can be harmed.
