= Adriaan van den Spiegel =

Flemish anatomist

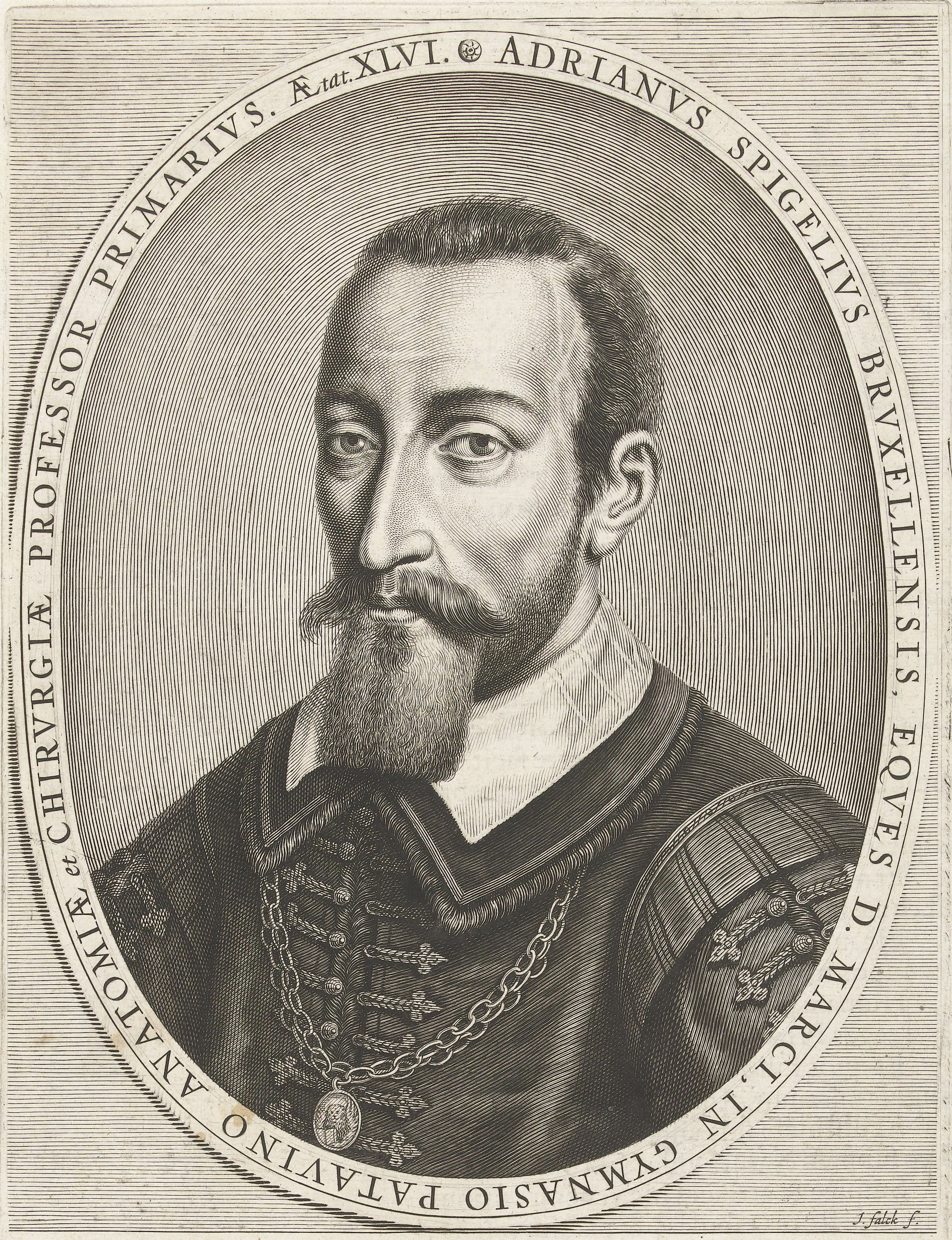
- Engraved portrait of Adriaan van den Spiegel by Jeremias Falck
- Born: 1578; Brussels, Spanish Empire
- Died: 7 April 1625 (aged 46 or 47 years); Padua, Republic of Venice
- Education: University of Leuven; Leiden University; University of Padua
- Scientific career
- Fields: Anatomy and Medicine
- Workplaces: University of Padua
- Doctoral advisor: Girolamo Fabrici
- Doctoral students: Werner Rolfinck; Adolphus Vorstius

Adriaan van den Spiegel (or Spieghel), name sometimes written as Adrianus Spigelius (1578 – 7 April 1625), was a Flemish anatomist born in Brussels. For much of his career he practiced medicine in Padua, and is considered one of the great physicians associated with the city. At Padua he studied anatomy under Girolamo Fabrici.

== Work ==
His best written work on anatomy is De humani corporis fabrica libri X tabulis aere icisis exornati, published posthumously in 1627. He borrowed the title from De humani corporis fabrica, written by his fellow countryman, Vesalius, who had also studied in Padua. The book was intended as an update in medical thinking (a century later) about anatomy. In his 1624 treatise De semitertiana libri quatuor, he gave the first comprehensive description of malaria.

His name is given to the Spigelian line (linea semilunaris) and the Spigelian fascia, which refers either to the combined aponeuroses of the external abdominal oblique muscle, the internal abdominal oblique muscle and transversus abdominis muscle, or just the aponeurosis of the transversus abdominis. An uncommon hernia of the Spigelian fascia that he first described is called a "Spigelian hernia".

The caudate lobe of the liver is also known as Spiegel's lobe.

Spiegel also did work as a botanist. The genus Spigelia (containing about 60 species) is named after him. Traditionally, the rhizome and roots of Spigelia marilandica were used as a cure for intestinal parasites.
