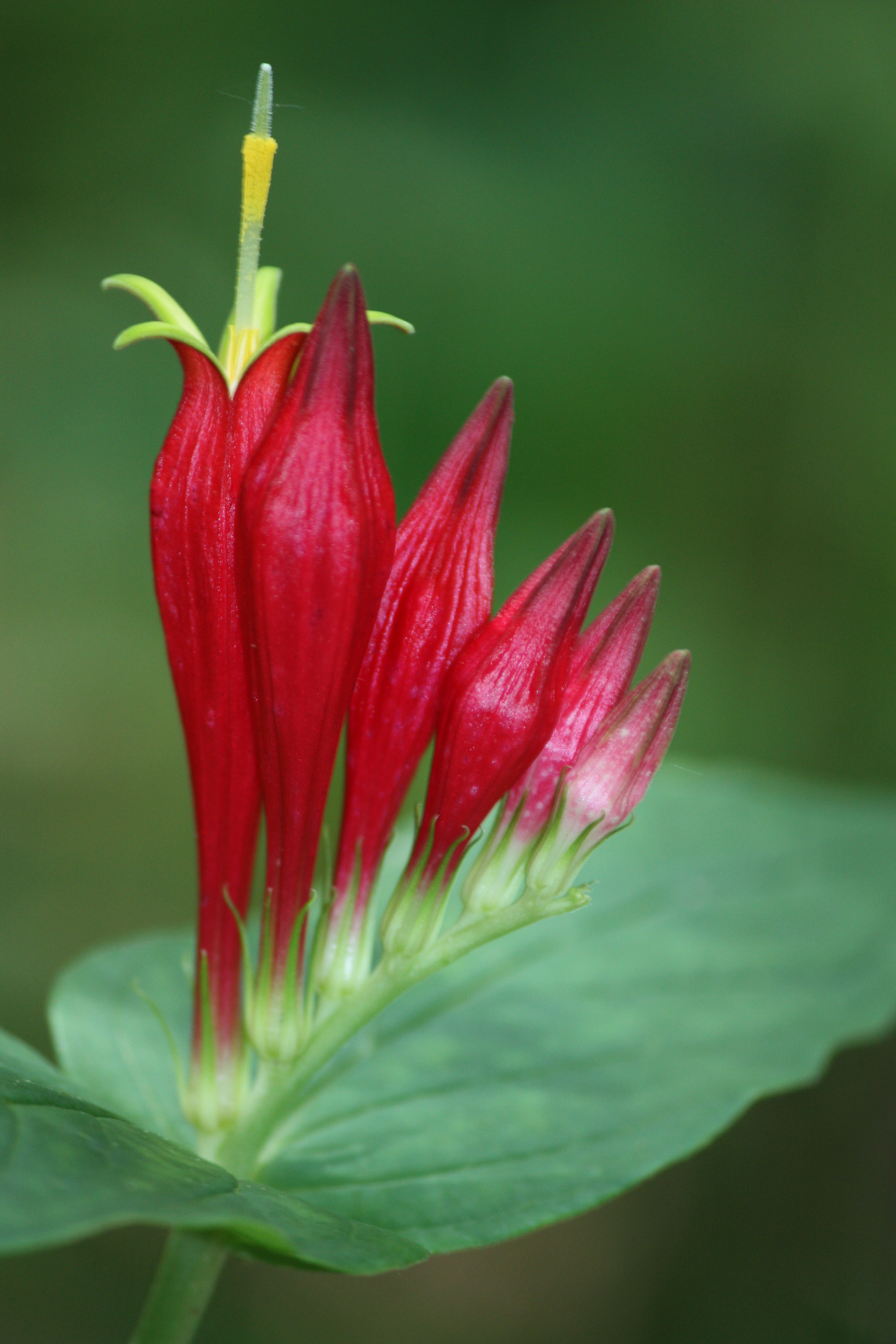
- Spigelia marilandica

Scientific classification
- Kingdom: Plantae
- Clade: Tracheophytes
- Clade: Angiosperms
- Clade: Eudicots
- Clade: Asterids
- Order: Gentianales
- Family: Loganiaceae
- Genus: Spigelia; L.

Type species
- Spigelia anthelmia L.

Synonyms
- List: Anthelmenthia P.Browne; Arapabaca Adans.; Canala Pohl; Coelostylis Torr. & A.Gray; Heinzelmannia Neck.; Liesneria Fern.Casas; Montira Aubl.; Pseudospigelia W.Klett

= Spigelia =

Genus of plants

Spigelia is a genus of flowering plants in the family Loganiaceae. It contains around 60 species, distributed over the warmer parts of the Americas, from the latitude of Buenos Aires to the Southern United States. It was named after Adriaan van den Spiegel (Adrianus Spigelius) by Carl Linnaeus in his 1753 Species Plantarum; the type species is Spigelia anthelmia. Pinkroot is a common name for plants in this genus.

== Species ==
The following species are recognised in the genus Spigelia:

- Spigelia aceifolia Woodson
- Spigelia aenea Lem.
- Spigelia alabamensis (K.Gould) K.G.Mathews & Weakley
- Spigelia alborubra A.R.Macedo & E.M.Pessoa
- Spigelia amambaiensis Fern.Casas
- Spigelia amazonica Fern.Casas
- Spigelia ambigua C.Wright
- Spigelia amplexicaulis E.F.Guim. & Fontella
- Spigelia andersonii Fern.Casas
- Spigelia andina Fern.Casas
- Spigelia anthelmia L.
- Spigelia asperifolia Progel
- Spigelia ayotzinapensis L.O.Alvarado, Islas-Hern. & Bustam.
- Spigelia beccabungoides Kraenzl.
- Spigelia beyrichiana Cham. & Schltdl.
- Spigelia blanchetiana A.DC.
- Spigelia brachystachya Progel
- Spigelia caaguazuensis Kraenzl.
- Spigelia carnosa Standl. & Steyerm.
- Spigelia cascatensis E.F.Guim. & Fontella
- Spigelia catarinensis E.F.Guim. & Fontella
- Spigelia chiapensis K.Gould
- Spigelia chocoensis Fern.Casas
- Spigelia cipoensis Zappi
- Spigelia coelostylioides K.Gould
- Spigelia colimensis Fern.Casas
- Spigelia cremnophila Zappi & E.Lucas
- Spigelia dolichostachya Fern.Casas
- Spigelia elbakyaniae S.Islas & L.O.Alvarado
- Spigelia faveolata Fern.Casas
- Spigelia flava Zappi & Harley
- Spigelia flemmingiana Cham. & Schltdl.
- Spigelia gentianoides Chapm. ex A.DC.
- Spigelia genuflexa Popovkin & Struwe
- Spigelia glabrata Mart.
- Spigelia gracilis A.DC.
- Spigelia guerrerensis L.O.Alvarado & J.Jiménez Ram.
- Spigelia guianensis (Aubl.) Lemée ex R.A.Howard
- Spigelia hamellioides Kunth
- Spigelia hatschbachii Fern.Casas
- Spigelia hedyotidea A.DC.
- Spigelia heliotropioides (Pohl) E.F.Guim. & Fontella
- Spigelia herzogiana Kraenzl.
- Spigelia hirtula Fern.Casas
- Spigelia humboldtiana Cham. & Schltdl.
- Spigelia hurleyi Fern.Casas
- Spigelia insignis Progel
- Spigelia kleinii L.B.Sm.
- Spigelia kuhlmannii E.F.Guim. & Fontella
- Spigelia laurina Cham. & Schltdl.
- Spigelia leiocarpa Benth. ex Fern.Casas
- Spigelia linarioides A.DC.
- Spigelia loganioides (Torr. & A.Gray) A.DC.
- Spigelia longiflora M.Martens & Galeotti
- Spigelia luciatlantica Fern.Casas
- Spigelia lundiana A.DC.
- Spigelia macrophylla (Pohl) A.DC.
- Spigelia marilandica (L.) L. - Woodland pinkroot
- Spigelia martiana Cham.
- Spigelia megapotamica Fern.Casas
- Spigelia mexicana A.DC.
- Spigelia mocinoi Islas-Hern. & L.O.Alvarado
- Spigelia nicotianiflora Chodat & Hassl.
- Spigelia novogranatensis Fern.Casas
- Spigelia olfersiana Cham. & Schltdl.
- Spigelia paraguariensis Chodat
- Spigelia pedunculata Kunth
- Spigelia persicarioides Ewan
- Spigelia petiolata H.Hurley ex Fern.Casas
- Spigelia polystachya Klotzsch ex Prog.
- Spigelia pulchella Mart.
- Spigelia pusilla Mart.
- Spigelia pygmaea D.N.Gibson
- Spigelia queretarensis Fern.Casas
- Spigelia ramosa L.B.Sm.
- Spigelia reitzii L.B.Sm.
- Spigelia riedeliana (Progel) E.F.Guim. & Fontella
- Spigelia rojasiana Kraenzl.
- Spigelia rondoniensis Fern.Casas
- Spigelia scabrella Benth.
- Spigelia schlechtendaliana Mart.
- Spigelia schultesii Fern.Casas
- Spigelia sellowiana Cham. & Schltdl.
- Spigelia sordida Fern.Casas
- Spigelia spartioides Cham.
- Spigelia speciosa Kunth
- Spigelia sphagnicola C.Wright
- Spigelia splendens Hook.
- Spigelia spruceana Zappi
- Spigelia stenocardia (Standl.) Fern.Casas
- Spigelia stenophylla Progel
- Spigelia tetraptera Taub. ex L.B.Sm.
- Spigelia texana (Torr. & A.Gray) A.DC.
- Spigelia trispicata H.Hurley ex K.Gould
- Spigelia valenzuelae Chodat & Hassl.
- Spigelia vestita L.B.Sm.
- Spigelia xochiquetzalliana Islas-Hern., Lozada-Pérez & L.O.Alvarado
