= Geocarpy =

Type of plant reproduction

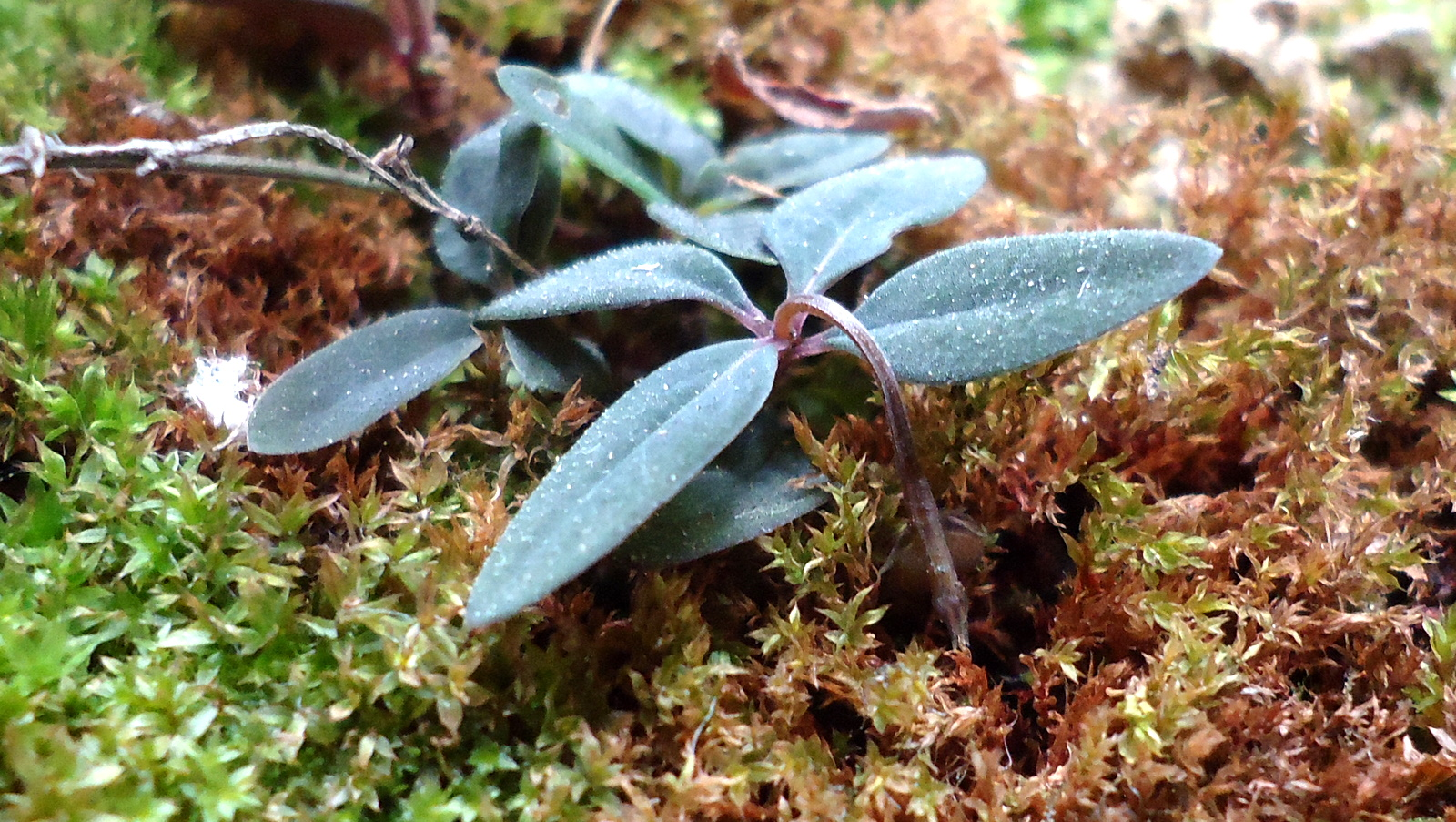
Geocarpy in Spigelia genuflexa

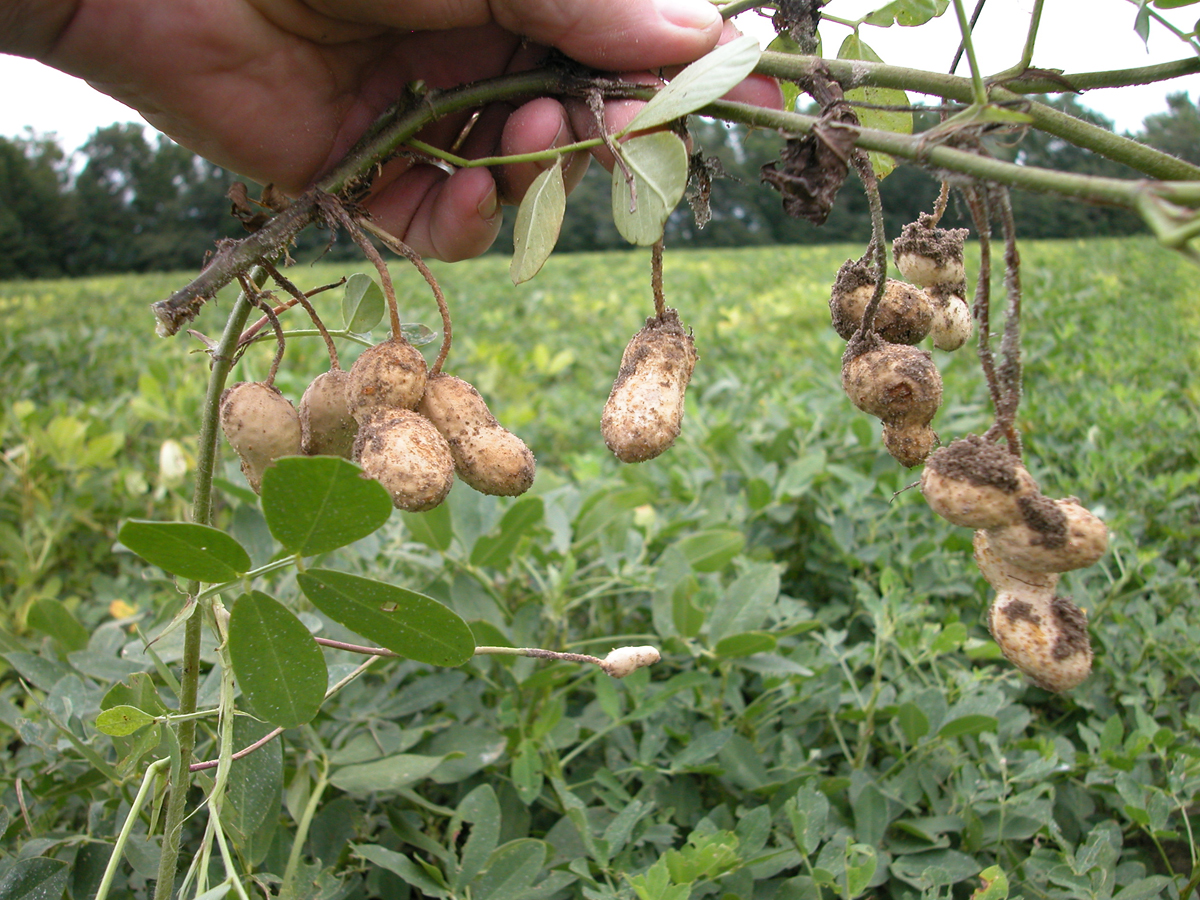
Peanut fruits forming below the ground.

Geocarpy is "an extremely rare means of plant reproduction", in which plants produce diaspores within the soil. This may occur with subterranean flowers (protogeocarpy), or from aerial flowers, parts of which penetrate the soil after flowering (hysterocarpy). It has evolved as an effective means of ensuring suitable environment for the plant's offspring.

Geocarpy is also linked with solifluction soils, where rapid thawing and freezing of surface soil causes almost continuous movement. This phenomenon is prevalent in high altitude areas of East Africa. In order to reproduce, geocarpic plants bend their stems so that the fruit can be embedded in the soil during the freezing process while the fruit is still attached to the plant itself.

Geocarpy is most frequent in tropical or semi-desert areas, and geocarpic species may be found in the families Araceae, Begoniaceae, Brassicaceae (Cruciferae), Callitrichaceae, Convolvulaceae, Cucurbitaceae, Fabaceae (Leguminosae), Loganiaceae, Moraceae and Rubiaceae. The best-known example is the peanut (Arachis hypogaea).
