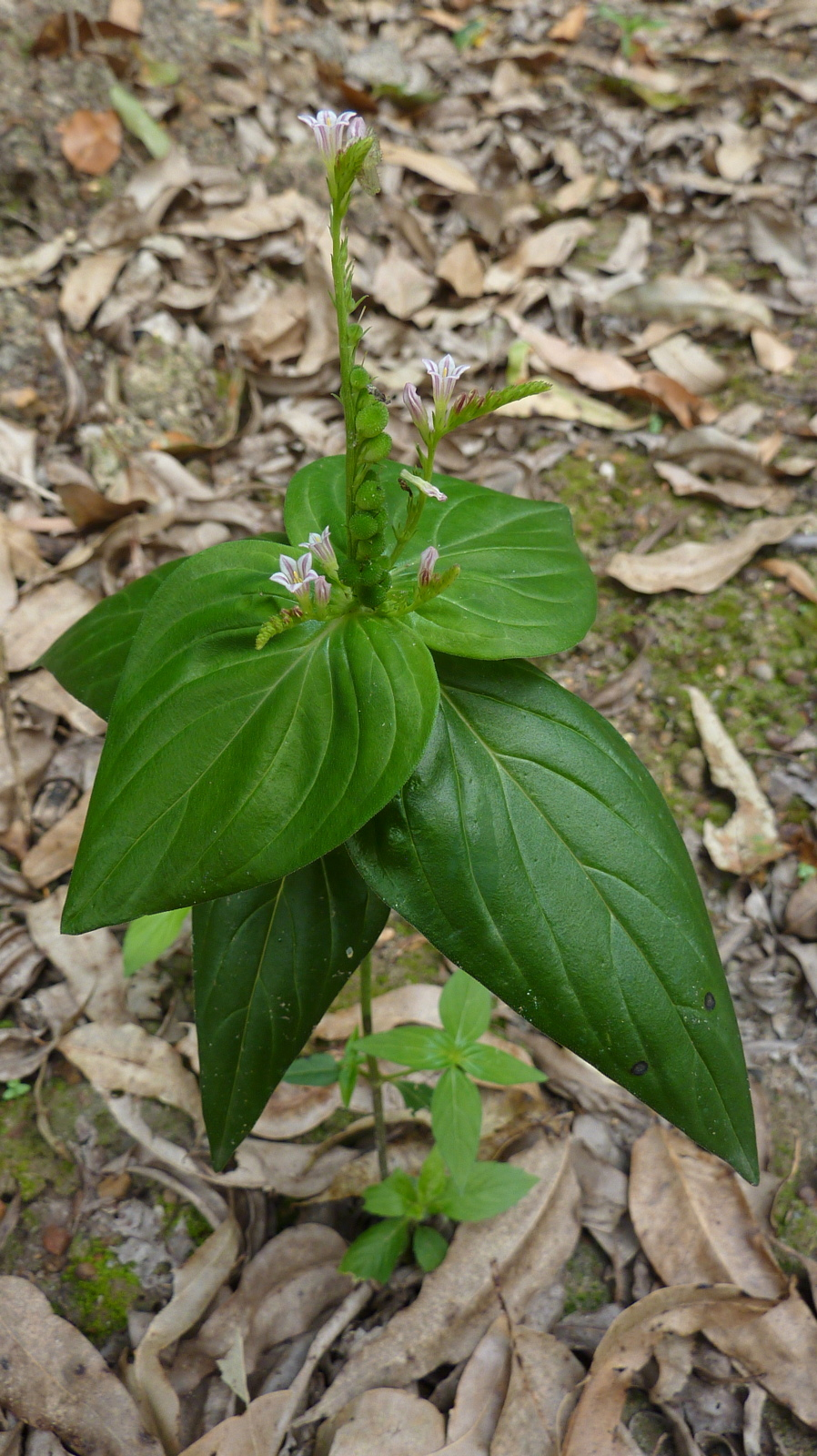
- In Brazil
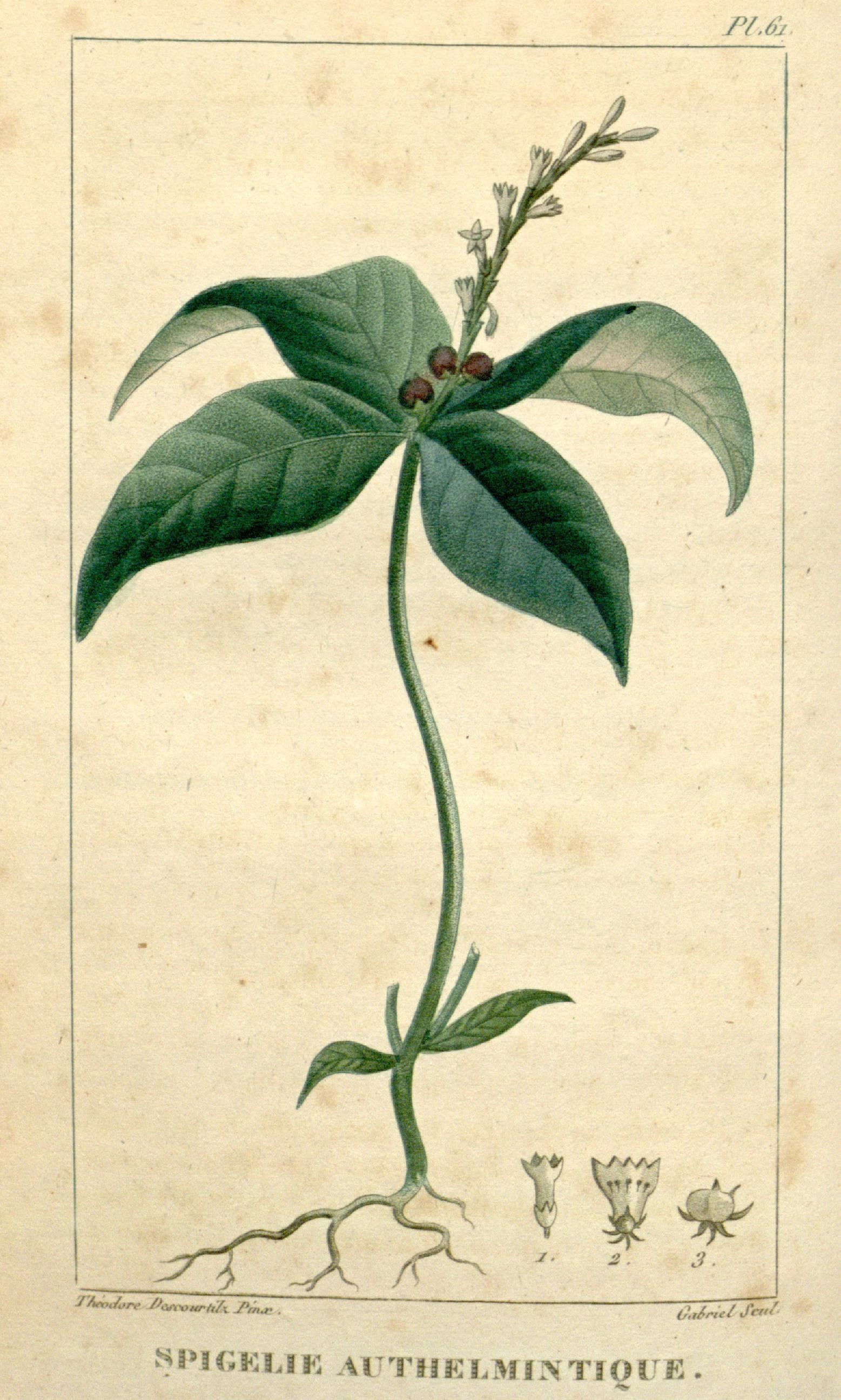
- Botanical illustration

Scientific classification
- Kingdom: Plantae
- Clade: Embryophytes
- Clade: Tracheophytes
- Clade: Angiosperms
- Clade: Eudicots
- Clade: Asterids
- Order: Gentianales
- Family: Loganiaceae
- Genus: Spigelia
- Species: S. anthelmia

Binomial name
- Spigelia anthelmia L.

Synonyms
- List: Spigelia anthelmia var. nervosa (Steud.) Progel; Spigelia anthelmia var. obliquinervia A.DC.; Spigelia anthelmia var. peruviana A.DC.; Spigelia domingensis Gand.; Spigelia fruticulosa Lam.; Spigelia nervosa Steud.; Spigelia oppositifolia Stokes; Spigelia quadrifolia Stokes; Spigelia stipularis Progel

= Spigelia anthelmia =

Species of flowering plant

Spigelia anthelmia, the West Indian pinkroot, wormbush, or wormgrass, is a species of flowering plant in the family Loganiaceae. It is native to Mexico, Central America, the Caribbean, Florida, and northern South America through to Bolivia and Brazil, and it has been widely introduced to other tropical locales, including western and west-central Africa, India, Sri Lanka, Indonesia, Thailand, Peninsular Malaysia, Hainan, and the Bismarck Archipelago. Highly poisonous, it is used as a vermifuge against intestinal worms.

It spreads its seeds through explosive dehiscence. The seeds are usually thrown more than 1 meter away.

== Toxicity ==
Spigelia anthelmia contains spiganthine, actinidine, isoquinoline, cholines, flavonoids, tertiary alkaloids (like strychnine) and quaternary alkaloids (like ryanodine). Symptoms of ingesting Spigelia anthelmia can include dim vision, face and eye muscle spasms, lightheadedness, and convulsions. It can be fatal to children.

Due to its toxicity, it is traditionally used as a vermifuge against intestinal worms. Experiments show that Spigelia anthelmia has been found to decrease the number of worms with increasing dose in trials of rats against Nippostronglylus brasiliensis.

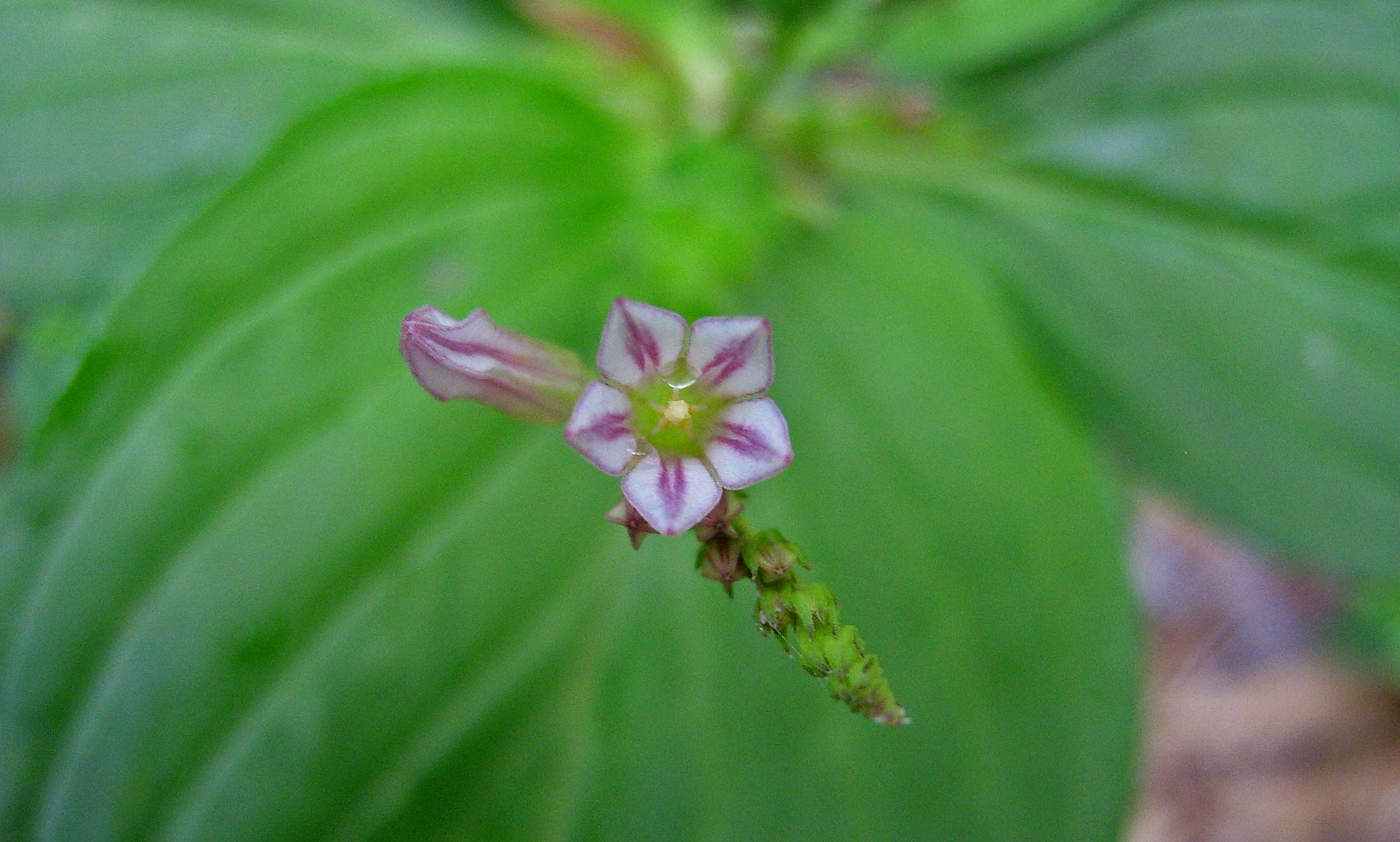
Inflorescence

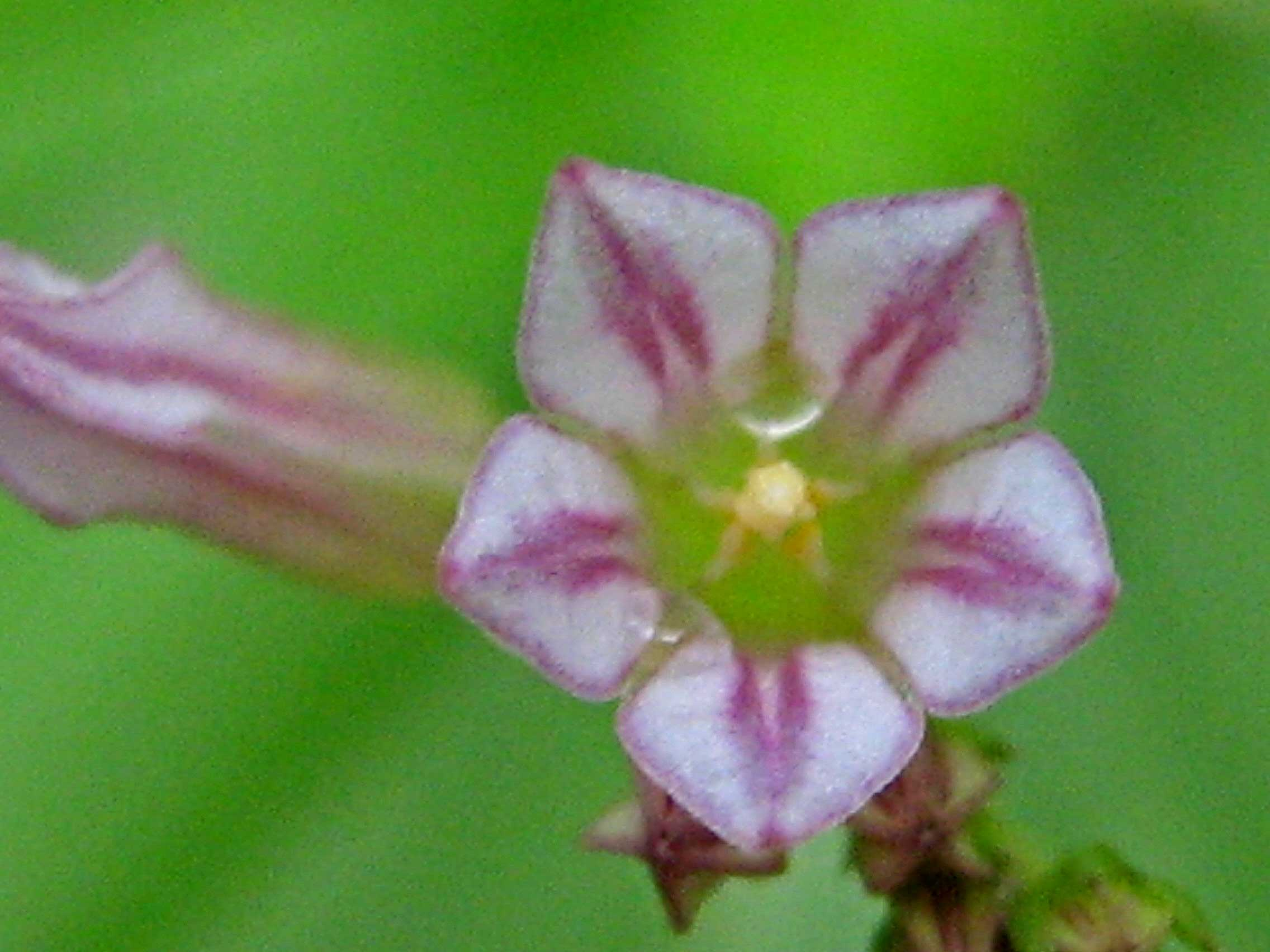
Close-up of flower

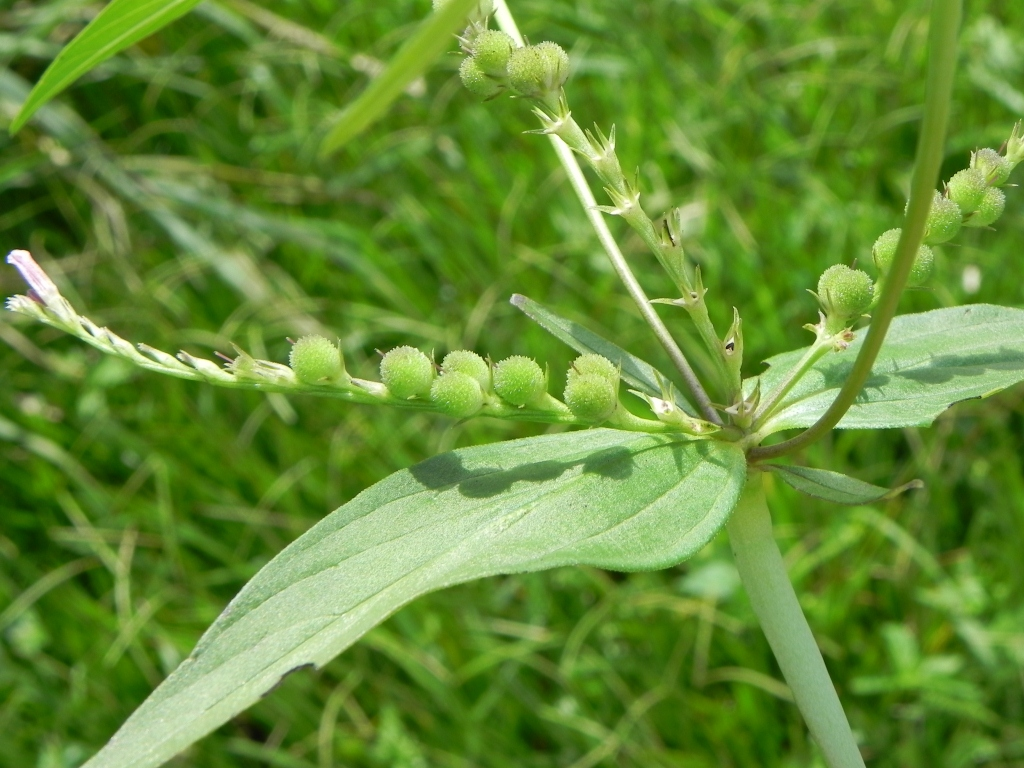
Unripe fruit

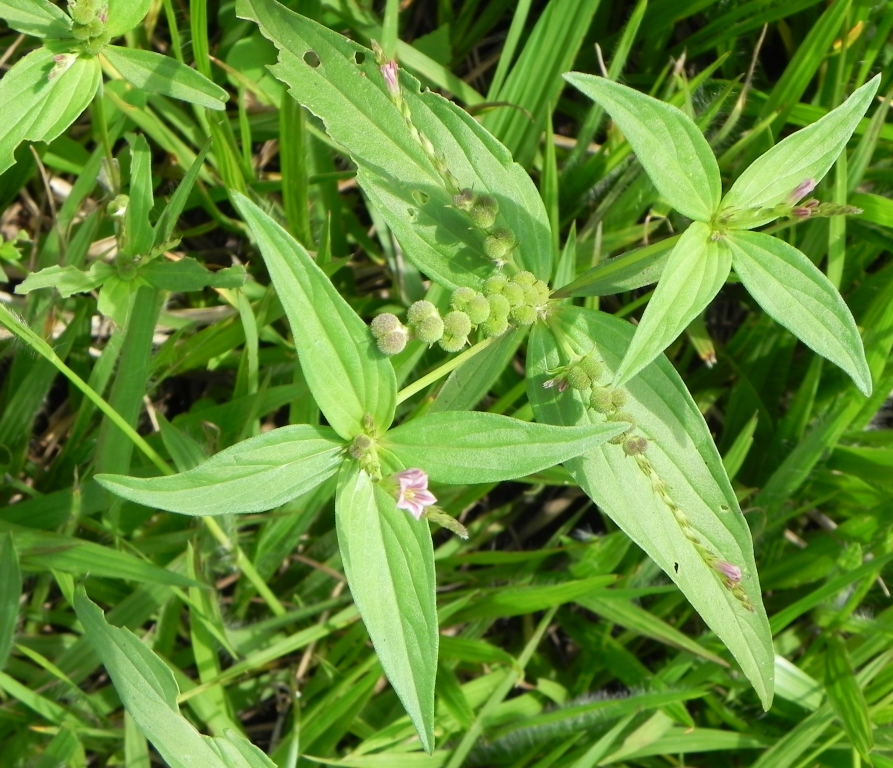
An individual with narrower leaves
