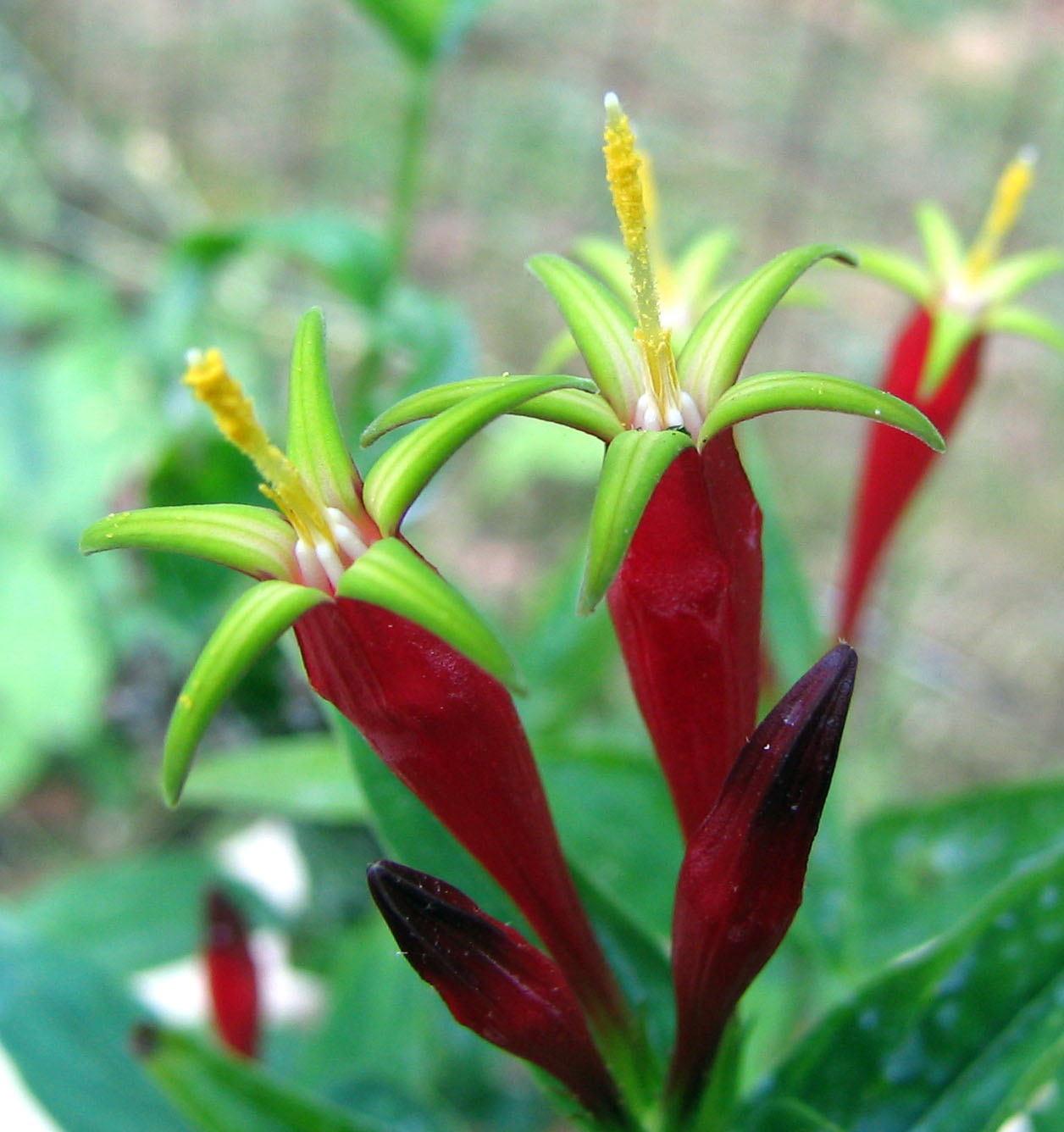

Conservation status
- Least Concern (IUCN 3.1)

- Apparently Secure (NatureServe)

Scientific classification
- Kingdom: Plantae
- Clade: Tracheophytes
- Clade: Angiosperms
- Clade: Eudicots
- Clade: Asterids
- Order: Gentianales
- Family: Loganiaceae
- Genus: Spigelia
- Species: S. marilandica

Binomial name
- Spigelia marilandica (L.) L.
- US distribution by state of Spigelia marilandica

= Spigelia marilandica =

Woodland pinkroot

Species of plant

Spigelia marilandica, the woodland pinkroot or Indian pink is a herbaceous perennial wildflower in the Loganiaceae family native to inland areas of the Southeastern and Midwestern United States.

It flowers in late spring and early summer and tends to be found in low moist woods, ravines, or stream banks in partial or full shade. The flowers are red, erect, tubes with a star-shaped yellow center at the tip. It will grow 30–61 cm (1–2 ft) high with a spread of 15–46 cm (0.5–1.5 ft).

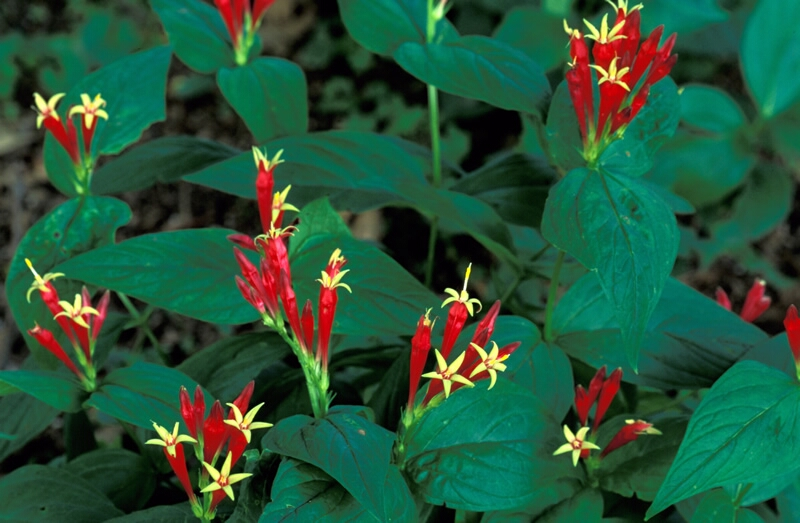
Indian pink

It is used as an ornamental plant, more popular in the UK and Europe than its native US.

Its dried roots are used as an anthelmintic (dewormer), and are followed by a saline aperient to avoid unpleasant side effects and ensure that the toxic root is expelled along with the worms. The roots are also a narcotic hallucinogen, but the alkaloid spigiline, which is largely responsible for both its hallucinogenic and medicinal action, can cause increased heart action, vertigo, convulsions and death if overdosed.

== Description ==
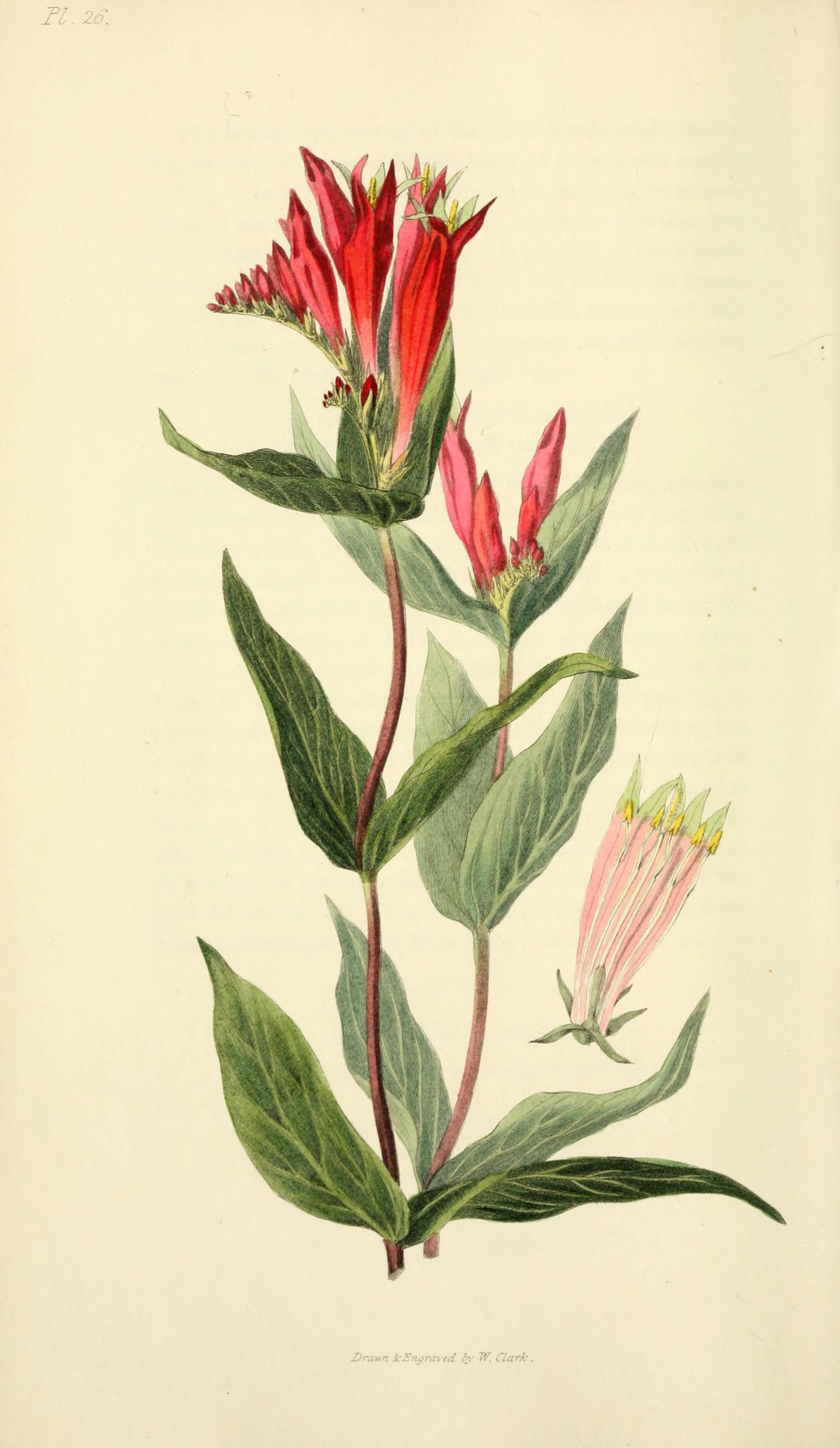
Illustration

Spigelia marilandica is an upright perennial herbaceous plant growing from 30 to 60 cm in height. Corollas are colored bright red on the outside and yellow to greenish yellow on the inside. Spigelia marilandica produces flowers in late spring and early summer with sporadic blooms in the fall, and it tends to be found in low moist woods, ravines, or stream banks in partial or full shade. The flowers are red and erect, and has tubes with a star-shaped yellow center at the tip. It will grow 30–61 cm (1–2 ft) high with a spread of 15–46 cm long (0.5–1.5 ft). Leaf proximals 3 or 4 pairs per stem, sessile, blade usually ovate to lanceolate, sometimes elliptic, 4–12 × 1–5 centimeters long, base rounded to cuneate; distals opposite. The seed is found in a two sided capsule, and grouped into balls of 4-7 and are separately spread when ready to be dispersed.

== Taxonomy ==
Spigelia marilandica is closely related to both S. alabamensis and S. gentianoides from which it is easily distinguished from the latter two species when in flower by its red and yellow (versus pink) corollas. Various alternate color forms of Spigelia marilandica have been found throughout its range, including plants with white corollas outside (green inside), and scarlet corollas outside and pink or pink with red stripes inside.

== Distribution and habitat ==
Native to inland areas of the Southeastern and Midwestern United States. Spigelia marilandica is not known to occur in Maryland. Most typically found in moist to dry woodlands and forests, usually on circumneutral soils. Found in South Carolina, southwestern North Carolina, Tennessee and Illinois, Oklahoma, south to Panhandle Florida and Texas; some floras allege its occurrence north to Virginia, New Jersey, and Pennsylvania, Alabama. Spigelia marilandica grows in USDA zones 5b-9.

== Uses ==
It is used as an ornamental plant, more popular in the UK and Europe than its native U.S. It is used to treat hypertension and heart disease. Commercial availability in the plant trade is limited in the U.S., nursery propagation is primarily vegetative. Spigelia marilandica has medicinal uses, dried roots are used as an anthelmintic (dewormer), and are followed by a saline aperient to avoid unpleasant side effects and ensure that the toxic root is expelled along with the worms.
