= Tamia discography =

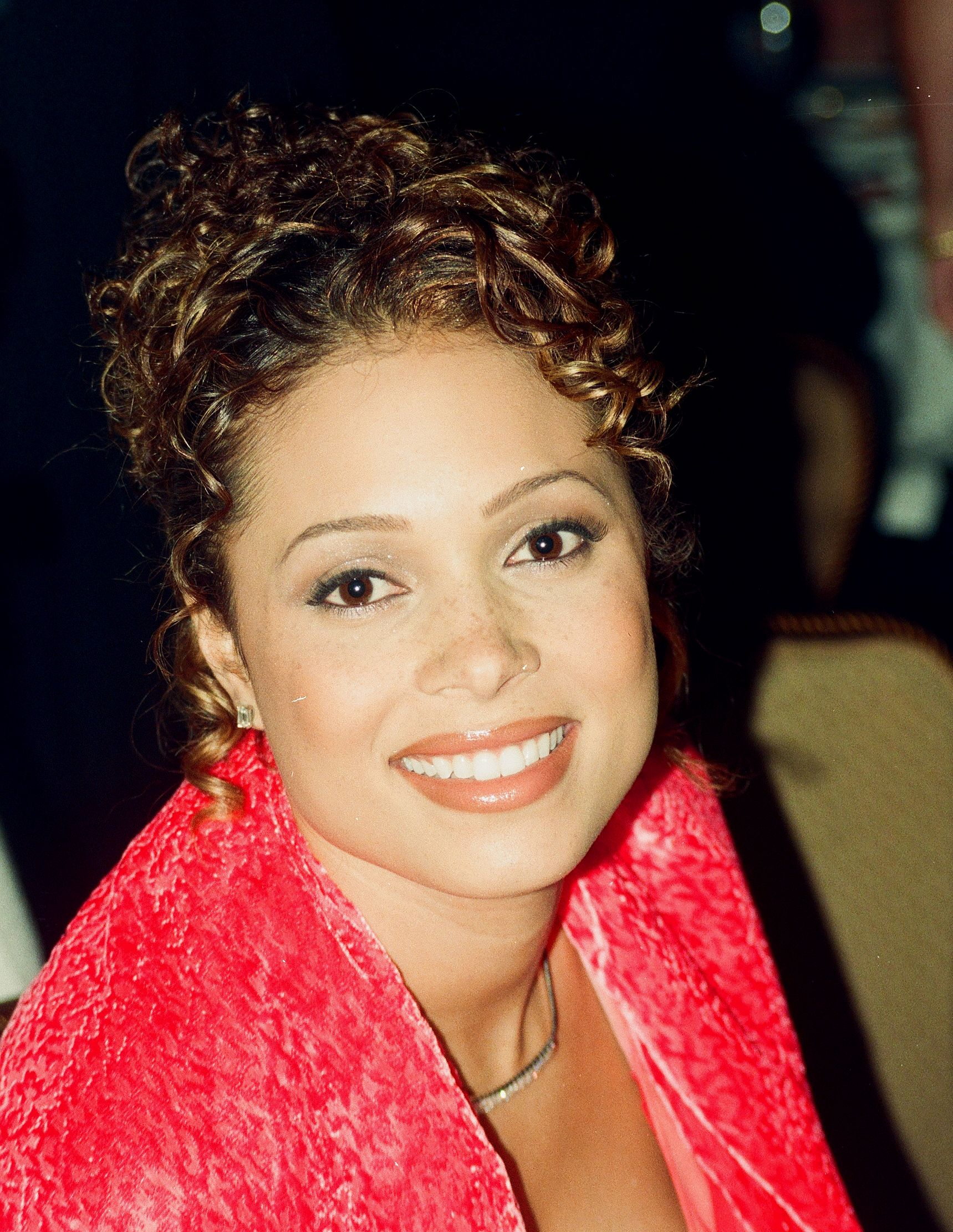
- Tamia in 1998
- Studio albums: 7
- Extended plays: 1
- Compilation albums: 1
- Singles: 25

Canadian singer and songwriter Tamia has released nine albums (including seven studio albums, one extended play, and one compilation albums), and twenty-six singles (including four as a featured artist and one charity singles). She began her career in 1995 as a protégé of musician Quincy Jones, who offered her the chance to appear on his album Q's Jook Joint (1995). Selected as the album's first single, their collaboration "You Put a Move on My Heart" became a top 20 success on the US Billboard Hot R&B/Hip-Hop Songs. The song, along with their second collaboration "Slow Jams" and "Missing You", a song she recorded with Brandy, Gladys Knight, and Chaka Khan for the soundtrack of the 1996 motion picture Set It Off, was later nominated for a Grammy Award.

Signed to Jones's Qwest Records, Tamia's self-titled debut album was released in 1998. The album took her work further into the contemporary R&B and hip hop genres but became a moderate commercial success, peaking at number sixty-seven on the US Billboard 200 chart and entered the top twenty of the Top R&B/Hip-Hop Albums chart. From the five singles that were released from the album, "Imagination" and "So into You" reached the top forty of Billboard Hot 100. The album was certified gold in Japan in June 1998 for 100,000 copies shipped to stores. In the United States, Tamia sold 416,000 copies in total. After a transition to Elektra Records, Tamia released her second album A Nu Day in 2000. Chiefly produced by Shep Crawford and Missy Elliott, the album entered the top ten on Billboard's Top R&B/Hip-Hop Albums chart. It included the singles "Can't Go for That" and "Stranger in My House," the latter of which reached number 10 on the US Billboard Hot 100, making it her highest-charting single to date. Her strongest seller yet, A Nu Day sold over 665,000 copies in the United States and was certified gold by the Recording Industry Association of America (RIAA).

Tamia released her long-delayed third album, More, following her diagnosis with multiple sclerosis in mid-2004. Pushed by the top five success of "Into You", an updated version of her 1998 single "So into You", which rapper Fabolous recorded for his album Street Dreams, More became her highest-charting album yet, debuting and peaking at number 17 on Billboard 200. The album spawned three singles. Feeling restricted by record label obligations, Tamia later split from Elektra to go independent with her own company, Plus One Music Group. Her first project with the label was Between Friends. Her second album with the rooster, Beautiful Surprise, was released in 2012 after a nearly six-year absence in which she had devoted herself to the education of her two children with retired basketball player Grant Hill. It debuted at number six on the Top R&B/Hip-Hop Albums chart and also garnered two Grammy Award nominations. In 2014, Tamia entered a joint venture with Def Jam Recordings to release her sixth album Love Life. Released in June 2015, it debuted at number 24 on the US Billboard 200, while reaching the top of Billboard's Top R&B Albums chart and number two on the Top R&B/Hip-Hop Albums chart, becoming her highest-charting album ever on both charts. Passion Like Fire, her seventh studio album, was released in September 2018.

== Albums ==
=== Studio albums ===
List of albums, with selected chart positions, sales figures and certifications
Title	Album details	Peak chart positions			Certifications
Title	Album details	US	US R&B	JPN	Certifications
Tamia	Released: April 14, 1998; Label: Qwest, Warner Bros.; Format: LP, Cassette, CD	67	18	25	RIAJ: Gold
A Nu Day	Released: October 10, 2000; Label: Elektra; Format: LP, CD	46	8	—	RIAA: Gold
More	Released: April 6, 2004; Label: Elektra; Format: LP, CD, digital download	17	4	106	
Between Friends	Released: November 14, 2006; Label: Plus One, Image; Format: CD, digital download	66	9	81	
Beautiful Surprise	Released: August 28, 2012; Label: Plus One, EMI; Format: CD, digital download	23	6	—	
Love Life	Released: June 9, 2015; Label: Plus One, Def Jam; Format: CD, digital download	24	2	—	
Passion Like Fire	Released: September 7, 2018; Label: Plus One, 21 Entmt., eOne; Format: CD, digital download	145	—	—	

=== Compilation albums ===
List of albums, with selected details
Title	Album details
Greatest Hits	Released: November 2, 2009; Label: Plus One, Image, Gallo; Format: CD, digital download

== EPs ==
List of EPs, with selected details
Title	Details
A Gift Between Friends	Released: October 23, 2007; Label: Plus One; Format: CD, digital download

== Singles ==
=== As lead artist ===
List of singles as lead artist, with selected chart positions, showing year released and album name
Title	Year	Peak chart positions						Certifications	Albums
Title	Year	US	US R&B	US Dance	NZ	NL	UK	Certifications	Albums
"Missing You" (with Brandy, Gladys Knight and Chaka Khan)	1996	25	10	—	2	—	—	RMNZ: Platinum	Set It Off soundtrack
"Imagination" (featuring Jermaine Dupri)	1998	37	12	—	30	90	—		Tamia
"So Into You"	1998	30	7	—	—	—	—	BPI: Silver	Tamia
"Falling for You"	1999	—	—	—	—	—	—		Tamia
"Loving You Still"	1999	—	78	—	—	—	—		Tamia
"Careless Whisper"	1999	—	—	—	—	—	—		Tamia
"Can't Go for That"	2000	84	23	—	—	—	—		A Nu Day
"Stranger in My House"	2001	10	3	1	—	—	128		A Nu Day
"Tell Me Who"	2001	—	63	2	—	—	—		A Nu Day
"Officially Missing You"	2003	83	31	4	—	—	—	RMNZ: Platinum	More
"Questions"	2004	— (Note: "Questions" did not enter the Billboard Hot 100, but peaked at number 12 on the Bubbling Under Hot 100 Singles chart.)	40	—	—	—	—		More
"Still"	2004	—	83	34	—	—	—		More
"Can't Get Enough"	2006	—	26	—	—	—	—		Between Friends
"Me"	2007	—	29	11	—	—	—		Between Friends
"Almost"	2007	—	59	—	—	—	—		Between Friends
"Beautiful Surprise"	2012	—	24	—	—	—	—		Beautiful Surprise
"Give Me You"	2012	—	—	—	—	—	—		Beautiful Surprise
"Sandwich and a Soda"	2015	—	—	—	—	—	—		Love Life
"Stuck with Me"	2015	—	—	—	—	—	—		Love Life
"Love Falls Over Me"	2015	—	—	21	—	—	—		Love Life
"Leave It Smokin'"	2018	—	—	—	—	—	—		Passion Like Fire
"Today I Do"	2018	—	—	—	—	—	—		Passion Like Fire
"It's Yours"	2018	—	—	—	—	—	—		Passion Like Fire
"Forever and a Day"	2026	—	—	—	—	—	—		Non-album single
"—" denotes items which were not released in that country or failed to chart.

=== As featured artist ===
List of singles as featured artist, with selected chart positions, showing year released and album name
Title	Year	Peak chart positions							Certifications	Albums
Title	Year	US	US R&B	AUS	FR	NZ	NL	UK	Certifications	Albums
"You Put a Move on My Heart" (with Quincy Jones)	1994	98	16	—	—	—	—	—		Q's Jook Joint
"Slow Jams" (with Quincy Jones, Babyface, Portrait & Barry White)	1995	68	19	—	—	2	—	—	RMNZ: Platinum	Q's Jook Joint
"Love Shouldn't Hurt" (with All-Star Group)	1998	—	—	—	—	—	—	—		Love Shouldn't Hurt
"Spend My Life with You" (with Eric Benét)	1999	21	1	—	—	—	—	—	RIAA: Gold	A Day in the Life
"Into You" (Fabolous featuring Tamia)	2003	4 (Note: featuring Tamia or Ashanti)	6	4	44	—	37	18	ARIA: Gold; BPI: Platinum; RMNZ: 3× Platinum	Street Dreams
"Three Little Words" (Louis York featuring Tamia)	2024	—	—	—	—	—	—	—		Non-album single
"—" denotes items which were not released in that country or failed to chart.

=== Promotional singles ===
Title	Year	Albums
"Make Tonight Beautiful"	1997	Speed 2: Cruise Control
"Tomorrow"	2004	More

== Appearances ==
=== Albums ===
Song	Year	Artist(s)	Album
"Don't Be Late, Don't Come Too Soon"	1997	LL Cool J featuring Tamia	Phenomenon
"The Christmas Song"	1998	Tamia, Jermaine Dupri	12 Soulful Nights of Christmas
"Into You"	2003	Fabolous featuring Tamia	Street Dreams
"(They Long to Be) Close to You"	2003	Gerald Levert featuring Tamia	Stroke of Genius
"Sunshine (Remix)"	2016	Eric Benét featuring Tamia	Eric Benét

=== Soundtracks ===
Song	Year	Artist(s)	Movie
"Missing You"	1995	Tamia, Brandy, Chaka Khan, Gladys Knight	Set It Off
"Keep Hope Alive"	1996	Tamia	The Associate
"Make Tonight Beautiful"	1998	Tamia	Speed 2: Cruise Control
"Careless Whisper"	1998	Tamia	A Night at the Roxbury
"Be Alright"	2002	Tamia	The Transporter
"It's a Party"	2003	Tamia	Honey
"Officially Missing You"	2003	Tamia	A Man Apart
"Dance My Dream"	2004	Tamia	First Daughter
"Things I Collected"	2005	Tamia	Diary of a Mad Black Woman

== Music videos ==
Title	Year	Director(s)	Artist(s)
"You Put a Move on My Heart"	1995	Matthew Rolston	Quincy Jones feat. Tamia
"Slow Jams"	1995	Matthew Rolston	Quincy Jones feat. Tamia, Babyface, Portrait & Barry White
"Missing You"	1996	F. Gary Gray	Tamia with Brandy, Gladys Knight & Chaka Khan
"Keep Hope Alive"	1996	Unknown	Tamia
"Make Tonight Beautiful"	1997	Paul Hunter	Tamia
"Imagination"	1998	Paul Hunter	Tamia feat. Jermaine Dupri
"So into You"	1998	Harvey White	Tamia
"Spend My Life with You"	1999	Jesse Vaughn	Eric Benét feat. Tamia
"Can't Go for That"	2000	Chris Hafner	Tamia
"Can't Go for That" (Remix)	2000	Chris Hafner	Tamia feat. 213
"Stranger in My House"	2000	Paul Hunter	Tamia
"Into You"	2003	Erik White	Fabolous feat. Tamia
"Officially Missing You"	2003	Paul Hunter	Tamia
"Questions"	2004	Darren Grant	Tamia
"Can't Get Enough"	2006	Darren Grant	Tamia
"Me"	2007	Margaret Malandruccolo	Tamia
"Almost"	2007	Margaret Malandruccolo	Tamia
"Beautiful Surprise"	2012	Ryan Pallotta	Tamia
"Sandwich and a Soda"	2015	Ryan Pallotta	Tamia
"Leave It Smokin'"	2018	Aaron A	Tamia
"Today I Do"	2018	Unknown	Tamia
"Three Little Words"	2024	Karl Weidmann	Louis York feat. Tamia

== See also ==
- List of songs recorded by Tamia
