= List of songs recorded by Tamia =

This is a list of songs recorded by singer and musician Tamia.

== Released songs ==
Song	Other performer(s)	Writer(s)	Originating album	Year	Ref.
"Almost"	—N/a	Shep Crawford	Between Friends	2006	
"Be Alright"	—N/a	—N/a	The Transporter	2002	
"Beautiful Surprise"	—N/a	Tamia Hill; Claude Kelly; Salaam Remi	Beautiful Surprise	2012	
"Because of You"	—N/a	Shep Crawford	Beautiful Surprise	2012	
"Become Us"	—N/a	Shep Crawford; Tamia Hill	Between Friends	2006	
"Believe in Love"	—N/a	Andrew Harr; Tamia Hill; Jermaine Jackson; Claude Kelly	Beautiful Surprise	2012	
"Better"	—N/a	Shep Crawford; Ryan Hawken; Tamia Hill	Passion Like Fire	2018	
"Black Butterfly"	—N/a	Barry Mann; Cynthia Weil	Love Life	2015	
"Can't Get Enough"	—N/a	LaShawn Daniels; Fred Jerkins III Rodney Jerkins	Between Friends	2006	
"Can't Go for That"	—N/a	Sara Allen; Missy Elliott; Brycyn Evans; Daryl Hall; Roosevelt Harrell; John Oates	A Nu Day	2000	
"Can't No Man"	—N/a	Missy Elliott; Errol McCalla Jr.	A Nu Day	2000	
"Careless Whisper"	—N/a	George Michael; Andrew Ridgeley	Tamia	1998	
"Chaise Lounge"	—N/a	Brandon Alexander; Tamia Hill; Ronnie Jackson; Alicia Renee Williams	Love Life	2015	
"Christmas Medley"	—N/a	Felix Bernard; Sammy Cahn; Jule Styne; Richard Smith	A Gift Between Friends	2007	
"Dance My Dreams"	—N/a	Grecco Buratto; Damon Elliott; Michael Kamen; Blake Neely; Forest Whitaker	First Daughter	2004	
"Day Dreaming"	—N/a	Aretha Franklin	Between Friends	2006	
"Day One"	—N/a	Tamia Hill; Claude Kelly; John Lardieri	Love Life	2015	
"Dear John"	—N/a	Jazz Nixon	A Nu Day	2000	
"Deeper"	—N/a	Tamia Hill; Lundon Knighten; Jonas Myrin; Julio Reyes Copello	Passion Like Fire	2018	
"Don't Be Late, Don't Come Too Soon"	LL Cool J	—N/a	Phenomenon	1997	
"Falling for You"	—N/a	Cheryl Lynn; Maurice White	Tamia	1998	
"Give Me You"	—N/a	Andre Brissett; Claude Kelly	Beautiful Surprise	2012	
"Go"	—N/a	Dallas Austin; Jasper Cameron	A Nu Day	2000	
"Gotta Move On"	—N/a	Keith Crouch; John Jubu Smith; Tamia Washington	Tamia	1998	
"Happy"	—N/a	Shep Crawford; Kenya Ivey	Between Friends	2006	
"Have to Go Through It"	Eric Benét	Shep Crawford	Between Friends	2006	
"Him"	—N/a	Andre Davidson; Sean Davidson; Andrew Harr; Tamia Hill; Jermaine Jackson; Claude Kelly	Beautiful Surprise	2012	
"I'm Yours Lately"	—N/a	Samuel Barnes; Alexander Mosely; Jean-Claude Olivier; Londell Smith	More	2004	
"If I Had to Choose"	—N/a	Jeremiah Bethea; Daniel Bryant; Ronnie Jackson; Tamia Hill	Passion Like Fire	2018	
"If I Were You"	—N/a	Shep Crawford; Stacy Daniels; Shae Jones	A Nu Day	2000	
"Imagination"	Jermaine Dupri	Jermaine Dupri; Berry Gordy; Alphonzo Mizell; Freddie Perren; Deke Richards; Manuel Seal	Tamia	1998	
"Into You"	Fabolous	Bob Robinson; Tamia Hill; John Jackson; Tim Kelley; Ronald LaPread; Lionel Richie	Street Dreams	2003	
"Is It Over Yet"	—N/a	Billy Kirsch	Beautiful Surprise	2012	
"Is That You?"	Jermaine Dupri	Jermaine Dupri; Manuel Seal	Tamia	1998	
"It's a Party"	—N/a	Joi Campbell; Warryn Campbell; Tamara Savage	Honey	2003	
"It's Not Fair"	—N/a	Claude Kelly	Beautiful Surprise	2012	
"It's Yours"	—N/a	Jeremiah Bethea; Tamia Hill; Ronnie Jackson; Philip Lynah, Jr. Benjamin Singh Reynolds; Omar Walker	Passion Like Fire	2018	
"Keep Hope Alive"	—N/a	Sally Jo Dakota; Narada Michael Walden	The Associate	1996	
"Last First Kiss"	—N/a	Shalonda Crawford; Shep Crawford	Between Friends	2006	
"Leave It Smokin'"	—N/a	Tamia Hill; Salaam Remi; Alicia Renee Williams	Passion Like Fire	2018	
"Like You Do"	—N/a	Tamia Hill; Ronnie Jackson; Alicia Renee Williams	Love Life	2015	
"Lipstick"	—N/a	Jaramye Daniels; Charles Harmon; Claude Kelly	Love Life	2015	
"Long Distance Love"	—N/a	Missy Elliott; Errol McCalla	A Nu Day	2000	
"Lose My Mind"	—N/a	Andrew Harr; Tamia Hill; Jermaine Jackson; Claude Kelly	Beautiful Surprise	2012	
"Lost in You"	—N/a	Jeremiah Bethea; Daniel Bryant; Tamia Hill; Rafael Ishman; Ronnie Jackson; Philip Lynah, Jr.	Passion Like Fire	2018	
"Love and I"	—N/a	Shep Crawford	Between Friends	2006	
"Love Falls Over Me"	—N/a	Warren Felder; Tamia Hill; Andrew Wansel; Alicia Renee Williams	Love Life	2015	
"Love I'm Yours"	—N/a	Shep Crawford; Tamia Hill	Beautiful Surprise	2012	
"Love Me in a Special Way"	—N/a	Eldra DeBarge	A Nu Day	2000	
"Love Shouldn't Hurt"	All-Star Group	Eva King; Steve Kipner; Jack Kugell	Love Shouldn't Hurt	1998	
"Loving You Still"	—N/a	Daryl Simmons	Tamia	1998	
"Make Tonight Beautiful"	—N/a	Diane Warren	Speed 2: Cruise Control	1997	
"Me"	—N/a	Shep Crawford	Between Friends	2006	
"Missing You"	Brandy, Gladys Knight, Chaka Khan	Gordon Chambers; Barry Eastmond	Set It Off	1996	
"More"	Freck The Billionaire	Samuel Barnes; Jermaine Denny; Alexander Mosely; Jean-Claude Olivier; Londell Smith	More	2004	
"Mr. Cool"	Mario Winans	Michael Jones; Jack Knight; Kandace Love; Mario Winans	More	2004	
"Never Gonna Let You Go"	—N/a	Kenny Hickson; Arthur Hoyle; Mario Winans	Tamia	1998	
"No Lie"	—N/a	Claude Kelly; Tamia Hill; Ray McCullogh; Jeremy Reeves; Ryan Ridgley; Ray Romulus; Jonathan Yip	Love Life	2015	
"No Way"	—N/a	Joshua Nile; V. Jeffrey Smith	More	2004	
"Not for Long"	—N/a	Jeremiah Bethea; Daniel Bryant; Tamia Hill; Rafael Ishman; Ronnie Jackson; Philip Lynah, Jr.	Passion Like Fire	2018	
"Nowhere"	—N/a	Terius Nash; Christopher Stewart	Love Life	2015	
"Officially Missing You"	—N/a	Marcus Vest	More	2004	
"On My Way"	Red Café	Samuel Barnes; Jermaine Denny; Alexander Mosely; Jean-Claude Olivier; Londell Smith	More	2004	
"Please Protect My Heart"	Eric Benét	Shep Crawford; Tamia Hill; Nora Payne	Between Friends	2006	
"Poetry"	—N/a	Joshua Nile	More	2004	
"Questions"	—N/a	R. Kelly	More	2004	
"Rain on Me"	—N/a	Kenny Hickson; Arthur Hoyle; Mario Winans	Tamia	1998	
"Rise"	—N/a	Jenna Andrews; Rory Andrew; Tamia Hill; Dillon Pace	Love Life	2015	
"Sandwich and a Soda"	—N/a	Warren Felder; Tamia Hill; Stephen Mostyn; Andrew Wansel; Autoro Whitfield; Alicia Renee Williams	Love Life	2015	
"Show Me Love"	—N/a	Paige Lackey	Tamia	1998	
"Single"	—N/a	Kelly Price	A Nu Day	2000	
"Sittin' on the Job"	—N/a	Shep Crawford; Tamia Hill	Between Friends	2006	
"Slow Jams"	Babyface, Portrait, Barry White	Rod Temperton	Q's Jook Joint	1996	
"Smile"	—N/a	Kenneth Edmonds; Shanice Wilson	More	2004	
"So Into You"	—N/a	Tim Kelley; Ronald LaPread; Lionel Richie; Bob Robinson; Tamia Washington	Tamia	1998	
"So Young"	—N/a	Alex Rowe	Tamia	1998	
"Someday at Christmas"	—N/a	Ron Miller; Bryan Wells	—N/a	2019	
"Special"	—N/a	Terius Nash; Christopher Stewart	Love Life	2015	
"Spend My Life with You"	Eric Benét	Eric Benét; Demonte Posey; George Nash, Jr.	A Day in the Life	1999	
"Stay"	—N/a	Nicolas de la Espriella; Ryan Hawken; Tamia Hill; Briana Martinez; Julio Reyes Copello	Passion Like Fire	2018	
"Still"	—N/a	Johnta Austin; Bryan-Michael Cox; Jermaine Dupri	More	2004	
"Still Love You"	—N/a	Christopher Barnes; Ivan Barinas; Carvin Haggins; Jazmine Sullivan	Beautiful Surprise	2012	
"Stranger in My House"	—N/a	Shep Crawford; Shae Jones	A Nu Day	2000	
"Stuck with Me"	—N/a	Rachel Assil; Kesia Hollins; Jamal Jones	Love Life	2015	
"Sunshine (Remix)"	Eric Benét	Eric Benét; Rubi Green; Jarius Mozee; Demonte Posey; Nick Smith	Eric Benét	2016	
"Tell Me How"	—N/a	Shep Crawford; Ryan Hawken; Tamia Hill	Passion Like Fire	2018	
"Tell Me Who"	—N/a	Shep Crawford; Tamia Washington	A Nu Day	2000	
"The Christmas Song"	—N/a	Mel Tormé; Robert Wells	12 Soulful Nights of Christmas	1996	
"The Way I Love You"	—N/a	Anesha Birchett; Antea Birchett; Rodney Jerkins; Keli Nicole Price; Delisha Thomas	Between Friends	2006	
"(They Long to Be) Close to You"	Gerald Levert	Burt Bacharach; Hal David	More	2004	
"Things I Collected"	—N/a	Dallas Austin; Debra Killings	Diary of a Mad Black Woman	2005	
"This Christmas"	—N/a	Donny Hathaway; Nadine Mackinnor	A Gift Between Friends	2007	
"This Time It's Love"	—N/a	Sean Hall; Christopher Stewart; Tamia Washington	Tamia	1998	
"Three Little Words"	Louis York	Chuck Harmony; Claude Kelly; Kathie Lee Gifford; Tamia Hill	—N/a	2024	
"Today I Do"	—N/a	Jeremiah Bethea; Tamia Hill; Ronnie Jackson	Passion Like Fire	2018	
"Tomorrow"	—N/a	Carvin Lawrence Winans; Deborah Kerr Winans	More	2004	
"Too Grown"	—N/a	LaShawn Daniels; Rodney Jerkins	Between Friends	2006	
"Un'h... to You"	—N/a	Harry W. Casey; Richard Finch; Rick James; Kisa; Keith Murray; Erick Sermon	A Nu Day	2000	
"Wanna Be"	—N/a	Missy Elliott; Roosevelt Harrell	A Nu Day	2000	
"When a Woman"	—N/a	Shep Crawford	Between Friends	2006	
"When the Sun Comes Up"	—N/a	Jeremiah Bethea; Daniel Bryant; Tamia Hill; Rafael Ishman; Ronnie Jackson; Philip Lynah, Jr.	Passion Like Fire	2018	
"Whispers"	—N/a	Tamia Hill; Joshua Nile; V. Jeffrey Smith	More	2004	
"Who Do You Tell?"	—N/a	Mark Coleman; Sherree Ford-Payne; Marc Nelson	Tamia	1998	
"Why Ask Why"	—N/a	Tamia Hill; Michael Jones; Mario Winans	More	2004	
"Why Can't It Be"	—N/a	Shep Crawford; Tamia Hill	Between Friends	2006	
"You Are Loved"	—N/a	Shep Crawford; Tamia Hill	Passion Like Fire	2018	
"You Give Me Something"	—N/a	Jenna Andrews; Rory Andrew; Tamia Hill; Dillon Pace	Love Life	2015	
"You Put a Move on My Heart"	—N/a	Rod Temperton	Q's Jook Joint	1996	

== Unreleased songs ==
Song	Other performer(s)	Writer(s)	Originating album	Leak	Ref.
"Daylight"	Chanté Moore	Vassal Benford	Daylight soundtrack	No	
"Don't Think"	—N/a	Chauncey Hawkins; Michael Carlos Jones; Jack Knight; Mario Winans	More	Yes	
"Fall on Love"	—N/a	Antonio Dixon; Warren Felder; Tamia Hill; Stephen Mostyn; Andrew Wansel; Autoro Whitfield; Alicia Renee Williams	Love Life	No	
"He's All I Need"	—N/a	Stacey Barthe; Corey Gibson; Tamia Hill	Unknown	No	
"Hold Up"	—N/a	Michael Carlos Jones; Jack Knight; Anthony DeShaun Walker; Mario Winans	More	Yes	
"I've Been Waiting"	—N/a	Tim Kelley; Bob Robinson	More	No	
"It Goes On"	—N/a	Tamia Washington; Christopher Stewart; White	Unknown	No	
"Love Guaranteed"	—N/a	Shep Crawford; Tamia Hill	Unknown	No	
"Lovelife"	—N/a	Jenna Andrews; Rory Andrew; Tamia Hill; Dillon Pace	Love Life	No	
"Night and Day"	—N/a	Andrea Martin; Jorge Corante; Ivan Matias	Tamia	No	
"Remedy"	—N/a	Jenna Andrews; Rory Andrew; Tamia Hill; Dillon Pace	Love Life	No	
"Stay Away"	—N/a	Damon Crawford; Shep Crawford; Tamia Hill	Unknown	No	
"This Time It's Love"	—N/a	Sean Kirk Hall; Tamia Hill; Christopher Stewart	Unknown	No	
"What Would He Say"	—N/a	Danny Nixon; Catrina Powell; Tamara Powell	Unknown	No	
