= Give Me You =

Give Me You may refer to:

- Give Me You (Mary J. Blige song), 2000
- Give Me You (Tamia song), 2012
- Give Me You, a 1961 song by Lee Dorsey
