= More (Tamia album) =

Studio album by Tamia
- Released: April 6, 2004
- Length: 58:04
- Label: Elektra
- Producer: 7 Aurelius; Babyface; Clue; Bryan Michael Cox; Shep Crawford; Jermaine Dupri; Duro; R. Kelly; Spanador; Gerald Levert; Edwin Nicholas; Joshua Nile; The Phantom; Poke & Tone; Tim & Bob; Mario Winans

Tamia chronology
A Nu Day (2000)	More (2004)	Between Friends (2006)

Singles from More
- 1. "Officially Missing You" Released: September 30, 2003; 2. "Questions" Released: February 24, 2004; 3. "Still" Released: October 19, 2004

More is the third studio album by Canadian R&B recording artist Tamia. It was released by Elektra Records on April 6, 2004 in North America. Created over a period of three years, in which the singer gave birth to her first child, the album, initially titled Still, was bumped from its original August 2003 schedule after Tamia was diagnosed with multiple sclerosis and forced to undergo treatment. With the illness in remission, she resumed work on the album later that year and arranged additional recording sessions with producers Poke & Tone, Spanador and R. Kelly to revamp parts of the album which saw her also reteaming with frequent partners such as Jermaine Dupri, Shep Crawford and Mario Winans.

The album was released to generally mixed reception from music critics, who applauded Tamia's vocal performances and noted its sophisticated sound. Criticism mainly targeted the amount of fillers as well as the album's occasionally inconsistent production. More debuted and peaked at number 17 on the US Billboard 200 and number four on the Top R&B/Hip-Hop Albums chart, with first week sales of 71,000 copies. It marked the highest-selling week of her career up to that point, doubling her prior best Nielsen SoundScan week, and as of 2018, remains the highest-charting album of Tamia's catalogue in the United States.

Preceded by the international top ten hit "Into You", a collaboration with rapper Fabolous from his second studio album Street Dreams (2003) based on Tamia's 1998 single "So into You", More spawned three singles. Lead single "Officially Missing You" and follow-up "Questions" scored moderate success however, reaching the top 40 of Billboard's Hot R&B/Hip-Hop Songs chart. In support of More, Tamia was featured as a special guest on the Verizon Ladies First Tour, co-headlined by Beyoncé, Alicia Keys and Missy Elliott, which became one of the biggest tours of the year. More became Tamia's third consecutive album to earn a Juno Award nomination in the R&B/Soul Recording of the Year category.

== Background ==
In 2000, Tamia transitioned from mentor Quincy Jones's Qwest Records to the Elektra label to produce and release her second studio album A Nu Day under the guidance of chairman Sylvia Rhone and consummate A&R executive Merlin Bobb. Chiefly produced by Shep Crawford and Missy Elliott along with co-producer Bink!, the album debuted and peaked at number 46 on the US Billboard 200 chart and spawned three singles, including debut single "Can't Go for That", and "Stranger in My House", which reached number 10 on the Billboard Hot 100, becoming her highest-charting single yet. Her strongest seller yet, A Nu Day sold over 665,000 copies in the United States and was certified gold by the Recording Industry Association of America (RIAA).

The following year, Tamia began work on her third studio album. As with her debut, she worked with a wider number of producers on the album such as Babyface, Seven Aurelius, and Shep Crawford, and reteamed with several collaborators from Tamia, including Jermaine Dupri and Mario Winans. However, despite the range of high-profile musicians, Tamia avoided following trends in favor of more mature and personal material. Commenting on the creation process, she elaborated that "I tried to do songs that speak to me. Really not get caught up with what's the trendy thing [..] I'm older. I sing about things that are relevant to me. I just wanted to stretch vocally and try different things as well." Several songs ("It's a Party", "No Way", "Hold Up", "Don't Think", "Officially Missing You (MIDI Mafia Remix)") from the Still edition of the album that didn't make the physical release were included as bonus/soundtrack tracks or leaked later.

== Critical reception ==
Professional ratings
Review scores
Source	Rating
AllMusic	3/5 stars
Now	3/5 Ns
USA Today	2.5/4 stars
Vibe	2.5/5 stars

More received generally mixed reviews from music critics. Rob Theakston of AllMusic, who rated it three out of five stars, noted that the "album finds her sticking to many of the roots that were in place through her previous releases". While he praised her voice as "stronger than ever", he found that "there are moments of pure R&B pop indulgence that will satisfy casual listeners and those looking for the hits. More really doesn't break new ground, nor does it separate her from the rest of the pack of acrobatic divas who adhere to the same formulas". People felt that the album, "while a serviceable set, ultimately leaves you wanting more as [Tamia] continues to play it safe." Alluding to her function as the opening act for Beyoncé, Alicia Keys and Missy Elliott during the Verizon Ladies First Tour, the magazine claimed that More "demonstrates why she is still an opening act who is not in those other ladies' league." Billboard magazine wrote that "with More, the singer stands on solid ground."

USA Today critic Steve Jones wrote that while the singer "has always been able to deliver a catchy tune, her albums tend to be spotted with songs that, while pleasant, also are easily forgettable." He found that "Tamia is best when given a strong ballad she can just cut loose on or one that lets her work her considerable sultry charm. Hers is a sweet, sophisticated sound. She just needs to be more consistent with it." Similarly, Raymond Fiore, writing for Entertainment Weekly, noted that while "Tamia debuted in 1995 with "You Put a Move on My Heart," possessing the promise of a young Whitney, three mediocre CDs later, she's yet to find another great song. Here, Babyface contributes sappy production, while the Trackmasters offer a formulaic party vibe. Only when beat maker 7 Aurelius lays down soothing acoustic guitar [...] does Tamia prove she can still sparkle." Now's Jason Richards remarked that More "offers some solid music produced by all the brand names of pop soul [...] As such, this album is the quintessence of contempo mainstream R&B – nothing more, nothing less. Nothing original, no risks, just Tamia’s young, lithe and at times robust vocals over expectedly syrupy for-the-radio/clubs production."

== Release and performance ==
Originally scheduled for an August 19, 2003 release, Tamia spent much of June and July 2003 travelling to promote the upcoming release of the album which was initially announced to be titled Still. Riding on the success of her collaboration with rapper Fabolous on "Into You", the second single from his second studio album Street Dreams (2003), as well as "Officially Missing You", the lead single from Still, Elektra joined forces with Verizon Wireless to promote the album through a television campaign, while Tamia went on a month-long radio tour and, along with Fabolous, had high-profile appearances on BET and MTV2. However, after experiencing intense fatigue and numb leg and going through countless tests, she was diagnosed with multiple sclerosis and forced to delayed Still to undergo treatment. With the illness in remission, Tamia resumed work in late 2003, while the album, retitled More, was retooled to include additional material by producers Poke & Tone, Spanador and R. Kelly.

Finally announced for April 6, 2004, another set-back to the album occurred only a month before its official release, when Sylvia Rhone, the chairman of Elektra Records, was fired after Warner Music, Elektra's parent company, announced to cut 1,000 jobs among a round of executive exits and departmental restructuring. Rhone, who had been instrumental in Tamia's transition from Qwest to Elektra in the late-1990s, had served as the executive producer on A Nu Day and More and worked closely with the singer. While Tamia denied rumors that she was seeking to leave the label, she recognized that "It’s a scary time for me [...] I definitely was very shocked that Sylvia was let go, but I’ve put in so much work on this project and I’d hate to walk away from it." Despite Warner's ongoing consolidation, More debuted and peaked at number 17 on the US Billboard 200 and number four on the Top R&B/Hip-Hop Albums chart, selling 71,000 copies in its first week. The "Hot Shot Debut" of the week on both charts, it marked the highest-selling week of her career up to that point, doubling her prior best Nielsen SoundScan week.

== Cover versions ==
In 2014, the album's title track "More" was remixed by British house duo Blonde (with the vocals re-recorded by Melissa Steel) and released as "I Loved You".

== Track listing ==
More track listing
No.	Title	Writer(s)	Producer(s)	Length
1.	"On My Way" (featuring Red Cafe)	Alexander Mosely; Jean-Claude Olivier; Jermaine Denny; Londell Smith; Samuel Barnes	Poke & Tone; Spanador^{[A]}	3:24
2.	"More" (featuring Freck the Billionaire)	Mosely; Olivier; Denny; Smith; Barnes	Poke & Tone; Spanador^{[A]}	4:03
3.	"Officially Missing You"	Marcus Vest	Seven Aurelius	4:01
4.	"Still"	Johnta Austin; Cox; Dupri	Jermaine Dupri; Bryan Michael Cox^{[A]}	4:27
5.	"Questions"	R. Kelly	R. Kelly	3:26
6.	"Whispers"	Tamia Hill; Joshua Nile; V. Jeffrey Smith	Nile; The Phantom	4:16
7.	"I'm Yours Lately"	Mosely; Olivier; Barnes; Jones	Poke & Tone; Spanador^{[A]}	2:46
8.	"Into You" (Fabolous featuring Tamia)	Bob Robinson; John Jackson; Lionel Richie; Ronald LaPread; Hill; Tim Kelley	DJ Clue; Duro	4:54
9.	"Smile"	Kenneth Edmonds	Babyface	5:11
10.	"Poetry"	Nile	Nile; The Phantom	4:30
11.	"Mr. Cool" (featuring Mario Winans)	Jack Knight; Kandace Love; Winans; Michael Jones	Mario Winans	3:29
12.	"(They Long to Be) Close to You" (featuring Gerald Levert)	Burt Bacharach; Hal David	Edwin "Tony" Nicholas; Levert	5:22
13.	"Why Ask Why"	Winans; Jones; Hill	Winans	3:36
14.	"Tomorrow"	Carvin Lawrence Winans; Deborah Kerr Winans	Shep Crawford	4:39
Total length:				58:04

Japanese bonus track
No.	Title	Writer(s)	Producer(s)	Length
15.	"Officially Missing You" (Midi Mafia Remix)	Vest	Seven Aurelius; Midi Mafia^{[B]}	4:15
Total length:				62:19

Digital bonus track
No.	Title	Writer(s)	Producer(s)	Length
15.	"No Way"	Nile; V. Smith	Nile; The Phantom	4:15
Total length:				62:19

Notes

- ^{^[A]} denotes co-producer
- ^{^[B]} denotes additional producer

== Charts ==
=== Weekly charts ===
Weekly chart performance for More
Chart (2004)	Peak position
Japanese Albums (Oricon)	106
US Billboard 200	17
US Top R&B/Hip-Hop Albums (Billboard)	4

=== Year-end charts ===
Year-end chart performance for More
Chart (2004)	Position
US Top R&B/Hip-Hop Albums (Billboard)	98

== Certifications ==
Certifications for More
Region	Certification	Certified units/sales
New Zealand (RMNZ)	Gold	7,500^{‡}
South Africa (RISA)	Platinum	50,000^{‡}
^{‡} Sales+streaming figures based on certification alone.

== Release history ==
More release history
Region	Date	Format	Label	Ref(s)
United States	April 6, 2004	CD; digital download	Elektra	
