= Sandwich and a Soda =

Single by Tamia

from the album Love Life
- Released: February 24, 2015
- Genre: R&B
- Length: 3:13
- Label: Plus 1; Def Jam
- Songwriters: Warren Felder; Tamia Hill; Stephen Mostyn; Andrew Wansel; Autoro Whitfield; Alicia Renee Williams
- Producer: Pop & Oak

Tamia singles chronology
"Give Me You" (2012)	"Sandwich and a Soda" (2015)	"Stuck with Me" (2015)

"Sandwich and a Soda" is a song by Canadian recording artist Tamia, recorded for her sixth studio album Love Life (2015). It was written by Tamia, Stephen Mostyn, Autoro Whitfield, Alicia Renee Williams, Warren Felder, and Andrew Wansel, with production helmed by Felder and Wansel under their production moniker Pop & Oak. An energetic and upbeat R&B song that talks about a woman's desire to cater to the male love interest of her life, "Sandwich and a Soda" contains a heavy electric bass and slightly squealing organ hits in its instrumentation.

The song received positive reviews from music critics who praised its composition and the earthy, funky nature. "Sandwich and a Soda" was released as the album's lead single by the Plus One Music Group and Def Jam Recordings on February 24, 2015. It reached number 20 on the US Billboard Adult R&B Songs chart. Tamia reteamed with Canadian director Ryan Pallotta to film an accompanying music video in March 2015. Set in California, it depicts Tamia on a Sunday afternoon, strutting down the streets of a town in her cadillac before visiting a cantina.

== Background ==
"Sandwich and a Soda" is a "smoky, jazz-kissed" mid-tempo R&B song written by Tamia along with Stephen Mostyn, Autoro Whitfield, Alicia Renee Williams, Warren "Oak" Felder, and Andrew "Pop" Wansel, with production helmed by the latter two. Development of the song was initiated by Felder and Wansel, who came up with a "rough idea" of what the song would sound like. Upon hearing a demo of it, Tamia liked the modern but classic instrumental track and decided to join the writing process. Commenting on her first collaboration with the duo, she later elaborated: "Pop and Oak are amazing. They have a way of making music that is authentically musical but still very current. It's also about the melody as well. I could literally sing that song with a stand-up bass and it could sound really good."

Built upon word plays, Tamia described "Sandwich and a Soda" as a "fun feel-good song" but remarked that it was "not super literal" however, stating that "it's not really about a sandwich and a soda. It's just about taking care of each other. The good, the bad, and the ugly. It's just about being there [...] about having a good time, driving with the windows down, holding hands". Commenting on what motivated her to release the song as the album's lead single, she elaborated that she chose it "because I thought it was just fun and just a great – it had a great beat and great vibe. And I wanted my first song back after three years from Beautiful Surprise to just show life and have life."

== Release and reception ==
In his New York Times review, writer Ben Ratliff found that the song was the "attention-getter" on the album: "For its first 30 seconds, she whispers over the intertwining patterns of two electric basses, played by real fingers with real hesitations and stickiness; one has the tone of an undergreased hinge. They sound close-up and untreated, punctuated by short chord stabs from an organ, which seems far away and softened by reverb. The song makes you think about distances." He added that "with the microphone at close range, [Tamia] underperforms. And that's mildly interesting, but there's so much else going on — layers of keyboards and vocals, buried loops of cries and shouts, the couplet “If you wanna ride these curves/ hop in your Chevy Nova.”

Similarly, Los Angeles Times reporter Gerrick D. Kennedy called "Sandwich and a Soda" one "of the album's stronger offerings, it's the closest she gets to painting outside her traditional color palette with its heavy electric bass and slight organ hits. But the message is the same: She's about pleasing the man who pleases her, both in and outside the bedroom". Andy Kellman of Allmusic found the track to be one of the "most relaxed songs" on Love Life. He remarked that it "generates steam, and Tamia sounds fully invested in [it] without doing any overselling." Allan Raible from ABC News called "Sandwich and a Soda" a "smooth, bass-heavy ode to eating after a session of lovemaking." He praised the song for its "earthy funkiness, while writing that "it has a great groove and it is bound to be a hit."

== Music video ==
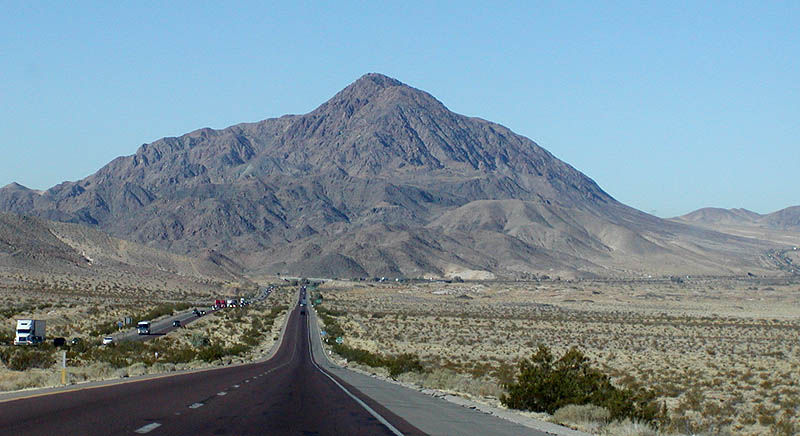
The music video for "Sandwich and a Soda" was filmed in the Californian desert.

An accompanying music video for "Sandwich and a Soda" was directed by Canadian director Ryan Pallotta on March 28, 2015. It marked his second collaboration with Tamia following their work on the video for "Beautiful Surprise" (2012). Filmed in the Californian desert, production was overseen by Dustin Highbridge for Black Dog Films. The video depicts Tamia on a Sunday afternoon, arriving in her convertible car at some lost town in the middle of the desert. She then stops near a cantina where she spends time with the local people, dancing and singing along to the song. The visuals were premiered on April 17, 2015 on Tamia's YouTube account.

== Format and track listing ==
- Digital download
1. "Sandwich and a Soda" – 3:13

== Credits and personnel ==
Credits adapted from the liner notes of Love Life.

- Kevin "KD Davis – mixing
- Jeff Edwards – engineering
- Warren Felder – writing
- Chris Gehringer – mastering
- Mark "Exit" Goodchild – engineering
- Tamia Hill – writing
- Stephen Mostyn – writing
- Mike Sal – engineering assistance
- Andrew Wansel – writing
- Autoro Whitfield – writing
- Alicia Renee Williams – writing

== Charts ==
Weekly chart performance for "Sandwich and a Soda"
Chart (2015)	Peak position
US Adult R&B Songs (Billboard)	20

== Release history ==
Release history for "Sandwich and a Soda"
Region	Date	Format	Label	Ref.
Worldwide	February 24, 2015	digital download; streaming	Plus 1; Def Jam	
