= Beautiful Surprise =

Studio album by Tamia
- Released: August 28, 2012
- Length: 43:52
- Label: Plus One
- Producers: Andre Brissett; Carvin & Ivan; Shep Crawford; Chuck Harmony; Claude Kelly; Luke Laird; The Monarch; Salaam Remi; The Runners

Tamia chronology
| Between Friends (2006) | Beautiful Surprise (2012) | Love Life (2015) |

Singles from Beautiful Surprise
- 1. "Beautiful Surprise" Released: March 2, 2012; 2. "Give Me You" Released: November 19, 2012

Beautiful Surprise is the fifth studio album by Canadian recording artist Tamia. It was released by her own label, Plus One Music Group on August 28, 2012 in the United States, with distribution handled by EMI and Capitol Records. Her first release since 2006's Between Friends following a longer hiatus during which she gave birth and raised her second daughter with husband Grant Hill, much of Beautiful Surprise was produced in the eight months leading up to the release of the album. A breakaway from her previous effort, Tamia consulted a wider range of musicians to work with her, including Claude Kelly, The Runners, duo Carvin & Ivan, Salaam Remi, and frequent collaborator Shep Crawford.

Upon release, Beautiful Surprise received a generally mixed reception from music critics, who praised Tamia's vocal performances but found the material too generic. In the United States, it debuted at number 23 on US Billboard 200 and number six on the Top R&B/Hip-Hop Albums chart, with first week sales of 13,000 copies. It received a nomination for Best R&B Album at the 55th Annual Grammy Awards, which was held in February 2013, while the first single from the album, its title track, a top ten hit on the Adult R&B charts, received a nomination for Best R&B Song. In support of the album, Tamia went on tour with R. Kelly from October through December 2012.

== Background ==
In 2004, Elektra Records released Tamia's third studio album, More. Her highest-charting release yet, it debuted at number seventeen on the US Billboard 200 and at number four on the Top R&B/Hip-Hop Albums chart, selling 58,000 copies in its first week. More was eventually certified gold by the Recording Industry Association of America (RIAA) and spawned the top forty single "Officially Missing You". The following year, Tamia split from Elektra and founded her own record label, Plus 1 Music Group. The first record to be released on the company was her fourth studio album Between Friends (2006).

Tamia's fifth studio album was recorded in New York City, Los Angeles, Miami and Nashville. She consulted producers Salaam Remi, The Runners, J. Phoenix and frequent collaborator Shep Crawford to help work on the album. In addition to co-writing most of the songs, Tamia doubled as executive producer with Claude Kelly, marking the first time the pair worked together. She also collaborated with country producer Luke Laird on the Wynonna Judd cover "Is It Over Yet" and an updated version of her 2004 single "Still". Commenting on her decision to work with Laird, she said that "I've always loved country music. I like the challenge of doing things outside the box."

== Critical reception ==
Professional ratings
Review scores
| Source | Rating |
|---|---|
| About.com | 3/5 stars |
| AllMusic | 2.5/5 stars |
| The New York Times | (positive) |

Beautiful Surprise received generally mixed reviews from music critics, many of whom praised Tamia's vocal performances but found the material too generic and formulaic. The New York Times felt that Beautiful Surprise is "wisely out of step with her surroundings, even if not always successfully so [...] Too often on this album Tamia undermines herself and pulls back from her biggest notes. These largely pro forma R&B songs turn out to be concessions — to genre, to age, to expectations. The true highlights of this album are the left turns".

Andy Kellman from Allmusic found that Beautiful Surprise "won't take any listeners by surprise. The album is split between upbeat but refined contemporary R&B and theatrical adult contemporary ballads [...] At best, the album is pleasant and especially relatable to those who are enduring or moving beyond relationships. However, few of these songs would be worthy of a concise Tamia best-of compilation." Similarly, Mark Edward Nero from About.com wrote that "only halfway [of the album] lives up to its name. Tamia and her voice are indeed beautiful, but to tell the truth, there's no real surprises to be heard here. Quite the opposite, in fact: Beautiful Surprise is chock full of formulaic songs that are too watered down to truly be considered R&B music."

== Commercial reception ==
Beautiful Surprise was released in the US on August 28, 2012; it debuted and peaked at number 23 on the Billboard 200 album chart with first week sales of 13,000 copies. In addition, the album reached the top ten of both the Billboard Independent Albums chart and the Top R&B/Hip-Hop Albums chart, peaking at number 4 and number 6, respectively. It marked her highest-charting entry after 2004's More. Commenting on its commercial success, Tamia elaborated, "considering I don't have a television show or anything else like that pushing the music, this is definitely a testament to R&B and its fans. Fans are out there supporting the music." The album has sold 65,000 copies in the US as of May 2015.

The album received a Grammy Award nomination for Best R&B Album in 2013. To promote Beautiful Surprise, Tamia performed as an opening act on R. Kelly's Single Ladies Tour. The album's first single, "Beautiful Surprise", became her biggest hit in a decade, reaching number 24 on the US Hot R&B/Hip-Hop Songs chart. It earned a Grammy Award nomination for Best R&B Song. The album's second and final single, "Give Me You", was less successful but became a top twenty hit on the Adult R&B Songs chart.

== Track listing ==
Beautiful Surprise track listing
| No. | Title | Writer(s) | Producer(s) | Length |
|---|---|---|---|---|
| 1. | "Lose My Mind" | Tamia Hill; Claude Kelly; Andrew Harr; Jermaine Jackson | The Runners; David & Jon Anderson^{[A]}; Kelly^{[B]} | 4:00 |
| 2. | "Give Me You" | Kelly; Andre Brissett | Brissett; Kelly^{[B]} | 3:34 |
| 3. | "It's Not Fair" | Kelly | Chuck Harmony; Kelly^{[B]} | 3:52 |
| 4. | "Believe in Love" | Hill; Kelly; Harr; Jackson | The Runners; Kelly^{[B]} | 3:30 |
| 5. | "Beautiful Surprise" | Hill; Kelly; Salaam Remi | Salaam Remi; Kelly^{[B]} | 3:37 |
| 6. | "Is It Over Yet" | Billy Kirsch | Luke Laird; Kelly^{[B]} | 3:58 |
| 7. | "Love I'm Yours" | Hill; Anthony Crawford | Shep Crawford | 5:28 |
| 8. | "Him" | Hill; Kelly; Harr; Jackson; Andre Davidson; Sean Davidson | The Runners; The Monarch^{[A]}; Hill^{[B]}; Kelly^{[B]} | 4:04 |
| 9. | "Still Love You" | Jazmine Sullivan; Christopher Barnes; Ivan Barinas; Carvin Haggins | Carvin & Ivan; Hill^{[B]} | 3:21 |
| 10. | "Because of You" | Crawford | Crawford; Hill^{[B]} | 4:21 |
| 11. | "Still" | Johnta Austin; Bryan Michael Cox; Jermaine Dupri | Laird; Kelly^{[B]} | 4:07 |
| Total length: | | | | 43:52 |

Notes and sample credits

- ^{^[A]} denotes co-producer
- ^{^[B]} denotes vocal producer
- "Is It Over Yet" is a cover of Wynonna Judd's "Is It Over Yet".

== Personnel ==
Performance credits

- Ivan Barias – keyboard
- Christopher Barnes – keyboard
- Perry Coleman – background vocals
- Sheri Hauck – background vocals
- Tommy Harden – drums
- Tamia Hill – background vocals, lead vocals
- Charles Judge – keyboard, piano, strings
- Claude Kelly – background vocals
- Pat McGrath – acoustic guitar
- Cortney Morrow – drums
- Jimmy "Professa" Russell – guitar
- Adam Shoenfeld – electric guitar
- Jimmie Lee Sloas – bass
- Jazmine Sullivan – background vocals
- Rob Torres – guitar

Technical and production

- Ivan Barias – engineering
- Ben "Bengineer" Chang – engineering
- Kevin "KD" Davis – mixing
- Alex Dolphin – engineering assistance
- Ryan Gore – engineering, mixing
- Tamia Hill – executive producer
- Mike "TrakGuru" Johnson – engineering
- Claude Kelly – co-executive producer
- Manny Marroquin – mixing
- Conrad "Connie" Martin – engineering assistance
- Phillip Scott III – engineering
- Jeff "Supa Jeff" Villanueva – engineering

== Charts ==
Weekly chart performance for Beautiful Surprise
| Chart (2012) | Peak position |
|---|---|
| US Billboard 200 | 23 |
| US Independent Albums (Billboard) | 4 |
| US Top R&B/Hip-Hop Albums (Billboard) | 6 |

== Release history ==
Beautiful Surprise release history
| Region | Date | Format | Label | Ref(s) |
|---|---|---|---|---|
| Various | August 28, 2012 | CD; digital download | Plus One | |
