= Still (Tamia song) =

Single by Tamia

from the album More
- Released: October 19, 2004
- Length: 4:27
- Label: Elektra
- Songwriter(s): Bryan Michael Cox; Jermaine Dupri; Johntá Austin
- Producer(s): Jermaine Dupri; Bryan Michael Cox

Tamia singles chronology
"Questions" (2004)	"Still" (2004)	"Can't Get Enough" (2006)

"Still" is a song by Canadian recording artist Tamia. It was written and produced by Johntá Austin, Bryan Michael Cox, and Jermaine Dupri and produced Dupri and Cox for her third studio album More (2004). The song was released as the album's third and final single in October 2004. A re-recorded version of "Still" with new arrangement and production by Luke Laird was also released on Tamia's fifth studio Beautiful Surprise (2012).

== Track listings ==
Remix single
No.	Title	Writer(s)	Producer(s)	Length
1.	"Still" (E-Smoove Mix)	Johntá Austin; Jermaine Dupri; Bryan Michael Cox	Dupri; Cox^{[a]}; E-Smoove^{[b]}	7:19
2.	"Still" (Lenny B. Club Mix)	Austin; Dupri; Cox	Dupri; Cox^{[a]}; Lenny Bertoldo^{[b]}	7:13
3.	"Still" (Johnick/FTL Club Mix)	Austin; Dupri; Cox	Dupri; Cox^{[a]}; Johnny "D" De Mairo^{[b]}; Nicholas Palermo, Jr.^{[b]}; Jeremias Santiago^{[b]}	8:29
4.	"Still" (Mr. Mig Club Mix)	Austin; Dupri; Cox	Dupri; Cox^{[a]}; Mr. Mig^{[b]}	7:21
5.	"Still" (DJ Spinna Club Mix)	Austin; Dupri; Cox	Dupri; Cox^{[a]}; DJ Spinna^{[b]}	9:08
6.	"Still" (D.F.A. Mix)	Austin; Dupri; Cox	Dupri; Cox^{[a]}; Daryl James; Fred McFarlane^{[b]}	8:58
7.	"Stranger in My House" (Global Club Mix)	Shep Crawford; Shae Jones	Crawford; Mike Rizzo^{[b]}	6:54
8.	"Still" (Global Club Mix)	Crawford; Tamia Washington	Crawford^{[a]}; Rizzo^{[b]}	6:21
9.	"Still" (Kelly G. Club Mix)	Austin; Dupri; Cox	Dupri; Cox^{[a]}; Kelly G.^{[b]}	6:36
10.	"Still" (Mr. Mig Breaks Mix)	Austin; Dupri; Cox	Dupri; Cox^{[a]}; Mr. Mig^{[b]}	7:29

Notes

- ^{^[a]} denotes co-producer
- ^{^[b]} denotes additional producer

== Credits and personnel ==
Credits adapted from the liner notes of More.

- Johntá Austin – writer
- Bryan Michael Cox – co-production, writer
- Jermaine Dupri – production, writer
- Tamia – vocals

== Charts ==
Chart (2006)	Peak position
US Hot R&B/Hip-Hop Songs (Billboard)	83
US Dance Club Songs (Billboard)	34
US Dance Singles Sales (Billboard)	3
