= Questions (Tamia song) =

Single by Tamia

from the album More
- Released: February 24, 2004
- Genre: R&B
- Length: 3:46
- Label: Elektra
- Songwriter: R. Kelly
- Producer: Kelly

Tamia singles chronology
"Officially Missing You" (2003)	"Questions" (2004)	"Still" (2004)

"Questions" is a song by Canadian R&B recording artist Tamia. It was written and produced by American singer R. Kelly for her third studio album More (2004). Released as the album's second single in the United States, it reached number 40 on the US Billboard Hot R&B/Hip-Hop Songs chart.

== Music video ==
A music video for "Questions" was directed by Darren Grant.

== Credits and personnel ==
Credits adapted from the liner notes of More.

- Steve Bearsley – recording
- Andy Gallas – recording
- R. Kelly – production, writer
- Donnie Lyle – guitar
- Ian Mereness – mixing, recording
- Jason Mlodzinski – mixing assistance
- Herb Powers – mastering
- Nathan Wheeler – engineering assistance

== Charts ==
Chart (2004)	Peak position
US Hot R&B/Hip-Hop Songs (Billboard)	40
