= Speed 2: Cruise Control (soundtrack) =

Soundtrack album to the film Speed 2: Cruise Control
- Released: May 20, 1997
- Genre: Reggae, R&B, pop
- Length: 48:27
- Label: Virgin
- Producer: Budd Carr

Singles from 'the Speed 2: Cruise Control soundtrack'
- 1. "Tell Me Is It True" Released: April 1997; 2. "My Dream" Released: 1997; 3. "Make Tonight Beautiful" Released: May 1997; 4. "Never Give Up" Released: July 1997; 5. "Speed TK Re-mixr" Released: July 1997

Speed 2: Cruise Control is the soundtrack album for the 1997 film of the same name. It was released by Virgin Records in May 1997, nearly a month before the film's release. Because of the film's Caribbean setting, the soundtrack features a variety of reggae music from artists including Common Sense, Jimmy Cliff, Maxi Priest and Shaggy. UB40, Carlinhos Brown and Tamia also have songs on the soundtrack, and appear in the film as entertainers on the cruise ship.

In addition to reggae, the soundtrack features a techno remix of the film score by Tetsuya "TK" Komuro and an R&B song by Tamia (which is sung by her character in the film). Many of the songs were first released on the soundtrack, and five were released as singles. The soundtrack received mixed reviews from critics, although it was praised for featuring reggae music.

== Music performed in the film ==
Speed 2: Cruise Control, the action thriller sequel to 1994's Speed starring Sandra Bullock, Jason Patric and Willem Dafoe, was released in 1997. The film is set on a cruise ship in the Caribbean; to complement its setting, the soundtrack primarily features reggae music. Speed 2 director-producer Jan de Bont wanted musicians to appear in the film as the ship's live entertainment. Four songs heard in Speed 2 were performed by the musicians appearing in the film, three of which were featured on the soundtrack album.

British reggae band UB40 perform "Can't Help Falling in Love" and "Tell Me Is It True". The former is a cover of an Elvis Presley song recorded by UB40 for the soundtrack to Sliver (1993) and released on their album, Promises and Lies (1993). "Tell Me Is It True" was first released on the Speed 2 soundtrack album and was later featured on UB40's studio album, Guns in the Ghetto (released ten days after the soundtrack album). The band was featured in the film after the filmmakers heard a demo of "Tell Me Is It True", and wrote a cameo appearance for them into the script.

Brazilian singer Carlinhos Brown was also featured in the film, performing "A Namorada" (from his 1997 album, Alfagamabetizado). De Bont chose Brown because he wanted music that was "lively", and thought Brown's music was "very physical" and "full of energy".

While UB40 and Brown appeared in the film as themselves, De Bont also wanted to feature a musician as one of the characters who gets trapped on the ship. He selected Canadian R&B singer Tamia because he wanted someone who could sing and act. Tamia did not plan on acting in a film so early in her career, but said the part was "too perfect for [her] to resist". She worked with de Bont and Quincy Jones to choose a song for the film; they decided on "Make Tonight Beautiful", written by Diane Warren.

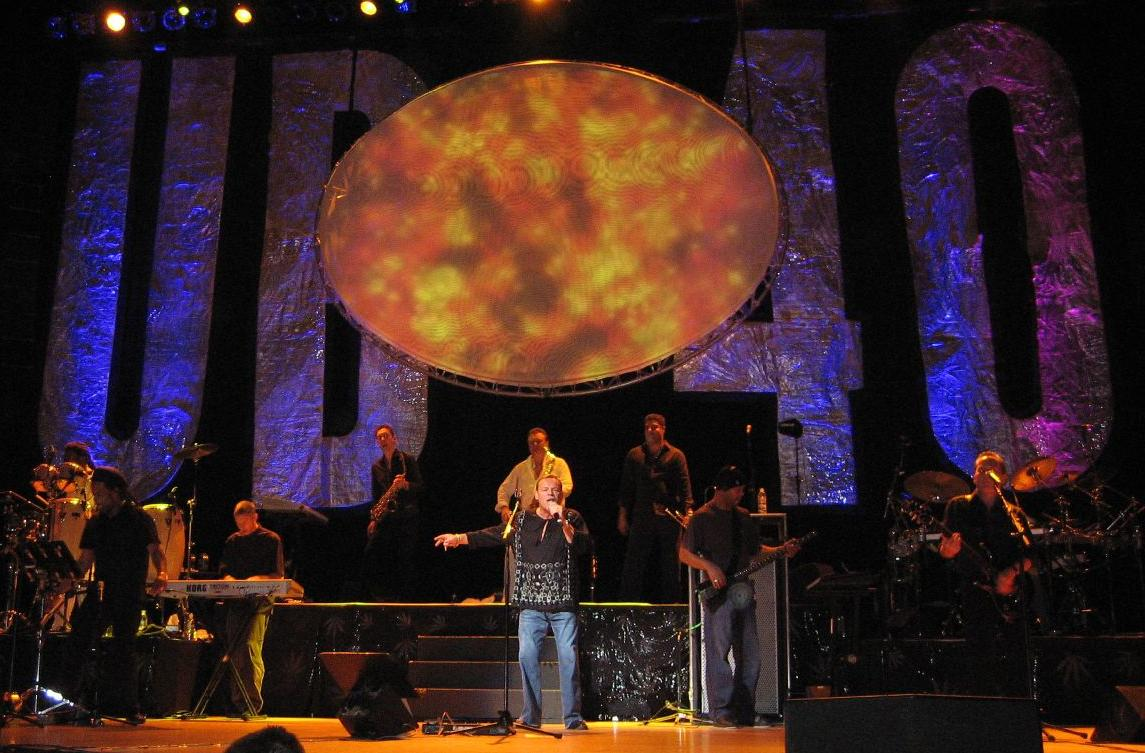

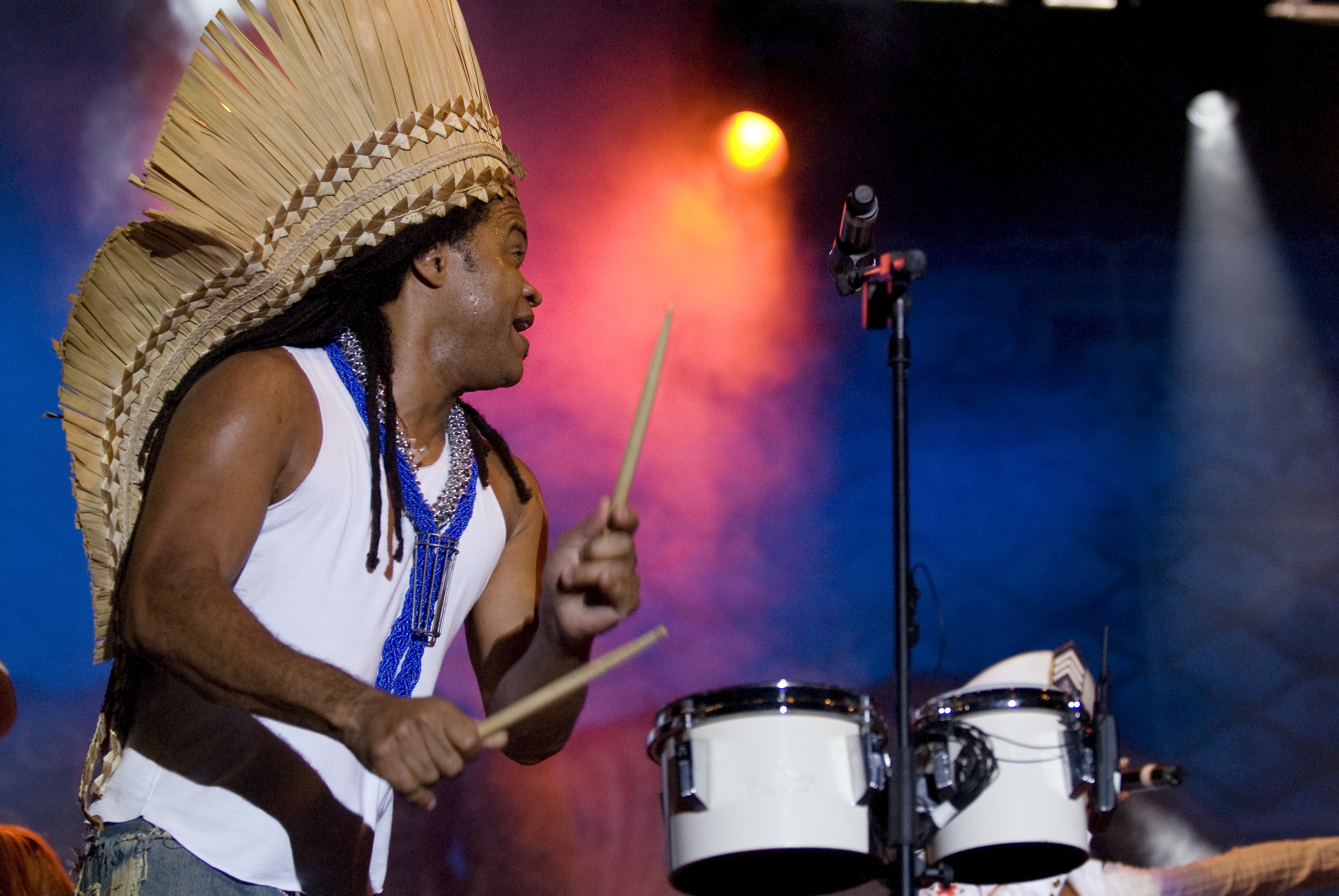
Artists UB40 (above) and Carlinhos Brown (below) appear in the film as entertainers on the cruise ship, performing their songs featured on the soundtrack.

== Additional music ==
Jamaican musician Shaggy wanted to include his cover of the Erma Franklin song "Piece of My Heart", but was unable because it was to be used in the soundtrack for an upcoming biographical film about Janis Joplin. He instead used his original song, "My Dream"; both tracks were later featured on Shaggy's next album Midnite Lover, released in August 1997.

American reggae band Common Sense featured their song, "Never Give Up", from their debut album Psychedelic Surf Groove (1996). When they appeared on the soundtrack, they did not have a recording contract with a major record label; lead singer Jai Vatuk said in June 1997 that the band had begun negotiations with the soundtrack's label, Virgin Records.; Virgin re-released Psychedelic Surf Groove later that year, and signed a contract with the band in 1998.

Jamaican reggae musician Jimmy Cliff contributed to the soundtrack with a re-recording of "You Can Get It If You Really Want" from The Harder They Come (1972); Barbadian reggae singer Rayvon featured his song, "Some People", before its release on his album Hear Me Cry, released in June 1997.

British reggae singer Maxi Priest was featured on the soundtrack after recording "It Starts in the Heart" for the soundtrack to Jungle 2 Jungle (1997). For the Speed 2 soundtrack he was asked cover a song in his characteristic style, and recorded a cover of "The Tide Is High". Priest said his work for Jungle 2 Jungle was "more satisfying" than for Speed 2 because "It Starts in the Heart" was an original song.

The soundtrack also includes a reggae cover of The Police's "Every Breath You Take" by Betty Wright, which was later released on the Police reggae-tribute album Reggatta Mondatta in July 1997. According to the San Jose Mercury News, Jamaican singer Diana King was scheduled to have a song on the soundtrack but her music was "judged too plodding" for the film.

In addition to "Make Tonight Beautiful", other non-reggae songs include a modern rock cover of Carole King's "I Feel the Earth Move" by Leah Andreone and the R&B song "Crazy" by British singer Mark Morrison. The version of "Crazy" selected for the soundtrack was a remix by the song's producer, Phil Chill, taken from the 12-inch single released in 1995.

Composer Mark Mancina, who scored Speed 2, wrote a techno instrumental based on the score. The track was entitled "Speed TK Re-mix", and was performed by Japanese musician Tetsuya "TK" Komuro with non-lexical vocals by Lynn Mabry. The instrumental was TK's debut in the United States, and was originally entitled "Speed 2 Theme". "Speed TK Re-mix" played during the film's ending credits, but Mancina hoped it would be featured in the film.

== Release ==
The Speed 2: Cruise Control soundtrack, produced by Budd Carr, was released on May 20, 1997 (nearly a month before the film's June 13 release) by Virgin Records. The TK Party Mix of "Speed TK Re-mix" was included on the Japanese release as a bonus track. Virgin Music Group executive vice president Nancy Berry said that when compiling the album, a decision was made not only to match the music in the film but to "create an album of summer music" and "a reggae compilation that would stand on its own". Two songs from the film are not featured on the album: "Can't Help Falling in Love" and "O mio babbino caro" by Victoria de los Ángeles. The album charted in Austria in August 1997, peaking at number 40.

To promote the soundtrack album, clips of each song were streamed on the film's official website and five tracks were sent to radio stations. The first single, "Tell Me Is It True", was released in late April 1997 and was commercially available on June 3; it was also the first single from Guns in the Ghetto. "My Dream" was the second single, followed by "Make Tonight Beautiful" in May and "Never Give Up" and "Speed TK Re-mix" in July. De Bont agreed with Virgin that Mancina's score could not be released until six months after the soundtrack's release, to avoid competition. The score was not released as an album until 13 years later, when it was released in a June 2010 limited edition by La-La Land Records and Fox Music.

== Reception ==
Professional ratings
Review scores
Source	Rating
AllMusic	2/5 stars
The Baltimore Sun	positive
Entertainment Weekly	D
Philadelphia Daily News	3.5/5 stars
Scripps Howard News Service	3/5 stars
South China Morning Post	negative

Response to the soundtrack was mixed. J. D. Considine of The Baltimore Sun said the film's Caribbean setting was a "perfect excuse" for the reggae tracks, and the album's "most surprising moments come with its cover versions". Jonathan Takiff of the Philadelphia Daily News awarded the album three-and-a-half of five stars for its reggae theme, which he described as a "rare [...] display of soundtrack consistency". Chuck Campbell from the Scripps-Howard News Service gave the album three out of five stars, commending the "continuity" of the reggae tracks but saying that it should have featured artists more popular than UB40 and it lacked the "commercial appeal" of other soundtracks released at the time. Stephen Thomas Erlewine of Allmusic said that although none of the soundtrack's songs are "standouts", it is a "fairly enjoyable collection of pop-reggae Latin-dance" music.

Mansha Daswani of the South China Morning Post was more critical of the soundtrack, calling it "surprisingly bland" and saying that "tracks that should be catchy [...] are surprisingly weak"; however, she praised TK's remix and Maxi Priest's cover of "The Tide Is High". David Browne of Entertainment Weekly graded the album "D", criticizing the "waterlogged" selection of artists and TK's remix but saying the reggae collection was a "[g]ood idea" given the film's setting. CMJ New Music Monthly said the soundtrack's cover versions were unnecessary, contributing to "one of the scariest trends in soundtracks over the last few years". At the 18th Golden Raspberry Awards in 1998, "My Dream" was nominated for Worst Song but lost to "the entire song score" from The Postman (1997). "Speed TK Re-mix" became popular in Japan; it was used as entrance music for wrestler Kazushi Sakuraba, and was re-released as a single in 2001 by popular demand.

== Track listing ==
No.	Title	Artist(s)	Length
1.	"Tell Me Is It True"	UB40	3:25
2.	"My Dream"	Shaggy	3:29
3.	"Make Tonight Beautiful"	Tamia	4:31
4.	"Crazy" (Phil Chill 12" Mix)	Mark Morrison	3:42
5.	"Speed TK Re-mix"	TK	4:07
6.	"A Namorada"	Carlinhos Brown	4:45
7.	"The Tide Is High"	Maxi Priest	4:03
8.	"I Feel the Earth Move"	Leah Andreone	3:37
9.	"Never Give Up"	Common Sense	4:17
10.	"You Can Get It If You Really Want"	Jimmy Cliff	3:45
11.	"Some People"	Rayvon	4:01
12.	"Every Breath You Take"	Betty Wright	4:45
Total length:			48:27

Japan bonus track
No.	Title	Artist(s)	Length
13.	"Speed TK Re-mix" (TK Party Mix)	TK	4:07
Total length:			52:34
