= Into You (Fabolous song) =

2003 single by Fabolous

Single by Fabolous featuring Tamia

from the album Street Dreams and More
- Released: June 16, 2003
- Studio: Right Track Recording (New York City)
- Length: 4:54
- Label: Elektra; Desert Storm
- Songwriters: Fabolous; Tim Kelley; Bob Robinson; Lionel Richie; Ronald LaPread; Tamia
- Producers: DJ Clue; DURO

Fabolous singles chronology
"Never Leave You (Uh Oooh, Uh Oooh)" (2003)	"Into You" (2003)	"Make U Mine" (2003)

Tamia singles chronology
"Tell Me Who" (2001)	"Into You" (2003)	"Officially Missing You" (2003)

Audio
- "Into You" (featuring Ashanti) on YouTube
- "Into You" (featuring Tamia) on YouTube

"Into You" is the a song by American rapper Fabolous, taken from his second album, Street Dreams (2003).

== Background ==
"Into You" was written by Fabolous for his second album Street Dreams (2003), while production on the song was helmed by DJ Clue and DURO. The song is based on Canadian singer Tamia's 1998 single "So Into You," which in turn samples the Commodores' song "Say Yeah." Due to this, original writers Tamia and Tim Kelley and Bob Robinson from Tim & Bob as well as Lionel Richie and Ronald LaPread are also credited as songwriters on "Into You." Singer Ashanti was consulted by Fabolous' team to appear as guest vocalist on the song. After Irv Gotti of Murder Inc. Records refused to let her film a music video to promote the single, Fabolous reached out to Elektra label mate Tamia to re-record a commercial version.

== Commercial performance ==
"Into You" was released as the album's second single through Elektra Records and DJ Clue's Desert Storm Records. Both the song's album version and the single version received heavy radio airplay, resulting in all three artists being credited on the charts. It eventually peaked at number four on the US Billboard Hot 100, becoming the second single from the album to reach the top 10, after "Can't Let You Go" (2003). The song stayed on the Hot 100 throughout 2003, finishing at number 23 on the chart's year-end edition. "Into You" also reached number four in Australia, becoming Fabolous highest-charting single by then, and entered the top 40 in Ireland, the Netherlands, and the United Kingdom.

== Music video ==
A music video for the single version of "Into You" was directed by Erik White. While Ashanti was expected to film visuals for the song along with Fabolous, Murder Inc. Records head Irv Gotti felt she was becoming "oversaturated" and withdraw her from the song, resulting into Tamia replacing her on the single version and in the video. Primarily shot on a Malibu beach, the weather conditions on the day of filming were marked by persistent cloudiness and rain. White later commented on the visuals: "Expecting to shoot a beautiful day on the beach in Malibu and waking up to clouds [and] rain. Made lemonade with my [cinematographer] and I think the look turned out much better than the typical sunny beach video." K. D. Aubert appears throughout the video as Fabolous's love interest.

== Track listings ==
US 12-inch single

A1. "Into You" (main mix original)
A2. "Into You" (main mix amended)
B1. "Into You" (instrumental)
B2. "Into You" (acapella)

Australian CD single

1. "Into You" (amended version)
2. "Into You" (explicit version)
3. "Young'n" (explicit version)
4. "Keepin' It Gangsta" (explicit version)

European CD single

1. "Into You" (main mix radio edit)
2. "Into You" (main mix explicit version)

UK CD single

1. "Into You" (main mix radio edit)
2. "Into You" (main mix explicit version)
3. "Young'n" (album version)
4. "Into You" (video)

UK 12-inch single

A1. "Into You" (main mix amended version)
A2. "Into You" (main mix explicit version)
B1. "Call Me" (explicit version)

== Charts ==
=== Weekly charts ===
Chart (2003–2004)	Peak position
Australia (ARIA)	4
Australian Urban (ARIA)	2
France (SNEP)	44
Ireland (IRMA)	39
Netherlands (Dutch Top 40)	24
Netherlands (Single Top 100)	37
Scotland Singles (OCC)	41
Switzerland (Schweizer Hitparade)	87
UK Singles (OCC)	18
UK Hip Hop/R&B (OCC)	8
US Billboard Hot 100	4
US Dance/Mix Show Airplay (Billboard)	19
US Hot R&B/Hip-Hop Songs (Billboard)	6
US Hot Rap Songs (Billboard)	4
US Pop Airplay (Billboard)	15
US Rhythmic Airplay (Billboard)	2

=== Year-end charts ===
Chart (2003)	Position
Australia (ARIA)	50
US Billboard Hot 100	23
US Hot R&B/Hip-Hop Singles & Tracks (Billboard)	24
US Hot Rap Tracks (Billboard)	10
US Mainstream Top 40 (Billboard)	58
US Rhythmic Top 40 (Billboard)	5

== Certifications ==
Region	Certification	Certified units/sales
Australia (ARIA)	Gold	35,000^{^}
New Zealand (RMNZ) featuring Ashanti	Gold	15,000^{‡}
New Zealand (RMNZ) featuring Tamia	3× Platinum	90,000^{‡}
United Kingdom (BPI)	Platinum	600,000^{‡}
^{^} Shipments figures based on certification alone.^{‡} Sales+streaming figures based on certification alone.

== Release history ==
Region	Date	Format(s)	Label(s)	Ref.
United States	June 16, 2003	Rhythmic contemporary; urban radio	Elektra; Desert Storm	
United States	July 7, 2003	Contemporary hit radio	Elektra; Desert Storm	
Australia	September 8, 2003	CD	Elektra; Desert Storm	
United Kingdom	October 20, 2003	12-inch vinyl; CD	Elektra; Desert Storm	
