= Missing You (Brandy, Gladys Knight, Tamia, and Chaka Khan song) =

1996 single by Brandy, Tamia, Gladys Knight and Chaka Khan

Single by Brandy, Tamia, Gladys Knight and Chaka Khan

from the album Set It Off: Music From the New Line Cinema Motion Picture
- Released: August 6, 1996
- Studio: East Bay Recording (Tarrytown, New York); The Hit Factory (New York City); Tracken, Capitol Recording, The Enterprise (Los Angeles)
- Length: 4:22
- Label: EastWest
- Songwriters: Gordon Chambers; Barry J. Eastmond
- Producer: Barry J. Eastmond

Brandy singles chronology
"Sittin' Up in My Room" (1995)	"Missing You" (1996)	"The Boy Is Mine" (1998)

Tamia singles chronology
"Slow Jams" (1996)	"Missing You" (1996)	"Imagination" (1998)

Gladys Knight singles chronology
"Next Time" (1995)	"Missing You" (1996)	"Feelin' Good" (1996)

Chaka Khan singles chronology
"Facts of Love" (1992)	"Missing You" (1996)	"Never Miss the Water" (1996)

Music video
- "Missing You" on YouTube

"Missing You" is a song by American singers Brandy, Gladys Knight, Chaka Khan and Canadian R&B musician Tamia. The song was used to promote the 1996 film Set It Off. It was written and produced by Gordon Chambers and Barry J. Eastmond and released as the lead single from the soundtrack album of the film on August 6, 1996, through EastWest Records. The song features a string arrangement conducted by Eastmond.

The collaboration peaked at number two in New Zealand and reached number 25 on the US Billboard Hot 100 as well as number 10 on the Billboard Hot R&B Singles chart. It gave Tamia her highest-charting single at the time and became one of the biggest hit singles of the 1990s for both Knight and Khan. At the 39th Annual Grammy Awards, "Missing You" was nominated for Best Pop Collaboration with Vocals.

== Background ==
"Missing You" was written by frequent collaborators Barry J. Eastmond and Gordon Chambers. Following the success of their song I Apologize," co-written and performed by Anita Baker, the duo was selected by Elektra Records CEO Sylvia Rhone to produce a song for the Set It Off motion picture. Much of the song was composed after Eastmond and Chambers viewed a rough cut of the film in Los Angeles, California, with Chambers drawing lyrical inspiration in part from the recent death of his grandmother. The duo produced several drafts of the song, which at one point was intended to be "multigenerational duet" by Roberta Flack and Lauryn Hill. This concept was later abandoned after Flack requested revisions to the song that were rejected by Rhone, and the decision was subsequently made for "Missing You" to be performed by four women, reflecting the film's four lead actresses.

Mary J. Blige, Tamia, Gladys Knight and Chaka Khan were initially selected to participate in the project. Although Blige recorded vocals for the song, she later requested their removal after her new management raised concerns regarding her potential overexposure due to her involvement in multiple concurrent projects. Rhone subsequently invited Brandy to replace Blige on the recording, serving as a last-minute addition to the project. Chambers later remarked that Brandy's contribution brought added "pop appeal" to the record. Upon the song's release, Rhone commented that the single provided an opportunity to combine "old school" and "new school" vocal talents while reflecting the film's narrative, which centers on four women. She further stated that she was pleased to have all four performers recording together in the studio and noted that the song was integral to the film, as it helped convey the distinct personalities of its four main characters.

== Composition and lyrics ==
"Missing You" is a ballad with elements of both pop and R&B. It has a running time of four minutes and twenty-two seconds. In the song, the performers sing about strong friendship and missing loved ones with lyrics such as: "Though I'm missing you/ I'll find away to get through/ Living without you/ 'cause you were my sister, my strength and my pride/ Only god may know why, still I will get by".

== Reception ==
While the Set It Off soundtrack album was slated for release on September 24, 1996, "Missing You" was released as the lead single from the project on August 6. Tracy E. Hopkins, a writer from Vibe magazine, highlighted "Missing You" as one of the "stronger" songs on the album. In November 1996, Jet magazine ranked the song at number five on their list of their Top 20 Singles. At the 1997 Grammy Awards, "Missing You" was nominated in the Best Pop Collaboration with Vocals category but lost the award to "Free as a Bird" by The Beatles. The song earned Tamia her third consecutive Grammy nomination, helping to raise expectations for her self-titled debut album.

On August 24, 1996, "Missing You" entered the US Billboard Hot 100 chart. It then charted at number 62 and earned the title of "Hot Shot Debut", a term used by Billboard to describe the week's highest debut on the chart. In early October of that year, the song reached number 25 on the list, becoming its peak position. The following week, sales of the single increased by 57 percent, helping it climb to number 22 and earn the title of "Greatest Gainer," a position it held for the next three weeks. In New Zealand, "Missing You" entered the country's New Zealand Singles Chart at number six on September 29, 1996. By the end of October, it reached number two, becoming its peak position on the chart. The song stayed on the chart for 18 weeks, eventually being certified platinum by Recorded Music NZ (RMNZ) for 15,000 copies shipped.

== Music video ==
A music video for "Missing You" was filmed by F. Gary Gray, director of Set It Off. The video portrays Brandy, Tamia, Gladys Knight and Chaka Khan performing in different landscapes each. Brandy is in the middle of a grassy field under a tree; Tamia is in the middle of a wheat field; Knight is on a covered bridge overlooking a stream; and Khan is on top of a cliff overlooking an ocean shore. It also features scenes from the 1996 film.

== Track listings ==
European and Australian CD single

1. "Missing You" (radio version) – 4:12
2. "Missing You" (a cappella intro mix) – 4:26
3. "Missing You" (mellow acoustic mix) – 4:14
4. "Missing You" (instrumental) – 4:13
5. "Missing You" (LP version) – 4:22

US CD and cassette single

1. "Missing You" (radio version)
2. "Missing You" (a cappella mellow mix)
3. Michael Speaks: "So Right, For Life" – 4:44

== Credits and personnel ==
Credits are lifted from the US CD single liner notes.

Studios

- Recorded at East Bay Recording (Tarrytown, New York), The Hit Factory (New York City), Tracken Studios, Capitol Recording, and The Enterprise (Los Angeles)
- Mixed at The Enterprise (Burbank, Los Angeles)

Main personnel

- Barry J. Eastmond – writing, keyboard and drum programming, conductor, production, arrangement, string arrangement, engineering
- Gordon Chambers – writing, background vocals, background vocal arrangement
- Brandy – vocals
- Tamia – vocals, background vocals
- Gladys Knight – vocals, background vocals
- Chaka Khan – vocals, background vocals
- Cindy Mizelle – background vocals
- LaJuan Carter – background vocals
- Phil Hamilton – guitar
- Eric Rehl – synth programming
- Stan Wallace – engineering
- Carl Nappa – engineering
- Manny Marroquin – engineering
- Bill Smith – engineering
- Kevin Stone – engineering assistance
- Greg Pinto – engineering assistance
- Rick Alvarez – engineering assistance
- Colin Sauer – engineering assistance
- Steve Genewick – engineering assistance
- Steve Kinsey – engineering assistance
- Erik Zobler – mixing
- Mike Tacci – mixing assistance

Orchestra

- Gene Orloff – concertmaster, violin
- Sanford Allen – violin
- Stanley Hunte – violin
- Winterton Garvey – violin
- Max Ellen – violin
- Ashley Horn – violin
- Elliot Rosoff – violin
- Margaret Magill – violin
- Tony Post – violin
- Regis Iandiorio – violin
- Belinda Whitney-Barratt – violin
- Sandra Billingslea – violin
- Alfred Brown – viola, string contracting
- Olivia Koppell – viola
- Sue Pray – viola
- Stephanie Fricker – viola
- Richard Brice – viola
- Carol Landon – viola
- Jesse Levy – cello
- Kermit Moore – cello
- Jeanne LeBlanc – cello
- Mark Shuman – cello
- Ron Carter – bass
- Gail Kruvand – bass

== Charts ==
=== Weekly charts ===
Chart (1996)	Peak position
Canada (Nielsen SoundScan)	35
New Zealand (Recorded Music NZ)	2
US Billboard Hot 100	25
US Adult Contemporary (Billboard)	30
US Hot R&B/Hip-Hop Songs (Billboard)	10
US Rhythmic Airplay (Billboard)	27
US Cash Box Top 100	15

=== Year-end charts ===
Chart (1996)	Position
New Zealand (RIANZ)	21
US Hot R&B Singles (Billboard)	52
US Top 40/Rhythm-Crossover (Billboard)	82

== Certifications ==
Region	Certification	Certified units/sales
New Zealand (RMNZ)	Platinum	10,000^{*}
United States	—	500,000
^{*} Sales figures based on certification alone.

== Release history ==
Region	Date	Format(s)	Label(s)	Ref(s).
United States	July 30, 1996	Rhythmic contemporary radio	EastWest America	
United States	August 6, 1996	Contemporary hit radio; commercial	EastWest America	
