= Spend My Life with You =

Single by Eric Benét featuring Tamia

from the album A Day in the Life
- Released: June 15, 1999
- Genre: R&B; neo soul
- Label: Warner Bros.
- Songwriters: Eric Benét*; Demonte Posey; George Nash, Jr.
- Producers: Benét; Posey; Nash

Eric Benét singles chronology
"Georgy Porgy" (1999)	"Spend My Life with You" (1999)	"When You Think of Me" (2000)

Tamia singles chronology
"Loving You Still" (1999)	"Spend My Life with You" (1999)	"Can't Go for That" (2000)

"Spend My Life with You" is a song by R&B singer Eric Benét featuring R&B singer Tamia. Released as the second single from Benét's second studio album A Day in the Life (1999), the song spent three weeks at number one on the US Billboard Hot R&B/Hip-Hop Songs chart and was certified gold by the Recording Industry Association of America (RIAA) for sales of over 500,000 units. It also peaked at number 21 on the Billboard Hot 100.

== Remix ==
The Buttered Soul remix was released and features Terry Dexter.

== Charts ==
=== Weekly charts ===
Chart (1999)	Peak position
US Billboard Hot 100	21
US Hot R&B/Hip-Hop Songs (Billboard)	1
US Rhythmic Airplay (Billboard)	39

Chart (2014)	Peak position
South Korea International (Circle)	37

=== Year-end charts ===
Chart (1999)	Position
US Billboard Hot 100	65
US Hot R&B/Hip-Hop Songs (Billboard)	14

Chart (2000)	Position
US Hot R&B/Hip-Hop Songs (Billboard)	65

== Certifications ==
Region	Certification	Certified units/sales
New Zealand (RMNZ)	Gold	15,000^{‡}
United States (RIAA)	Gold	500,000^{^}
^{^} Shipments figures based on certification alone.^{‡} Sales+streaming figures based on certification alone.

== See also ==
- R&B number-one hits of 1999 (USA)
