= Q's Jook Joint =

Studio album by Quincy Jones
- Released: November 7, 1995
- Genre: R&B
- Length: 73:01
- Label: Qwest, Warner Bros.
- Producer: Quincy Jones, Rod Temperton (Associate Producer)

Quincy Jones chronology
Back on the Block (1989)	Q's Jook Joint (1995)	From Q with Love (1999)

Singles from Q's Jook Joint
- 1. "You Put a Move On My Heart" Released: October 3, 1995; 2. "Slow Jams" Released: March 5, 1996; 3. "Stomp" Released: September 3, 1996

Professional ratings
Review scores
Source	Rating
AllMusic	2.5/5 stars
The Encyclopedia of Popular Music	4/5 stars
Entertainment Weekly	(favourable)
Los Angeles Times	3.5/5 stars
Muzik	5/5 stars

Q's Jook Joint is an album by Quincy Jones, released in 1995 by Qwest Records. The album reached No. 1 on the Billboard jazz albums chart on December 30, 1995. Q's Jook Joint won the Grammy Award for Best Engineered Album, Non-Classical in 1997.

== Track listing ==
All tracks were produced by Jones, except "Rock with You", produced by Jones and QDIII, and "Heaven's Girl", produced by Jones and R. Kelly. Rod Temperton also served as Associate Producer.

No.	Title	Featuring	Writer(s)	Arranger(s)	Length
1	"Jook Joint" (Intro)	Kid Capri, Funkmaster Flex, LL Cool J, James Moody, Coko, Stevie Wonder, Lester Young, Brandy, Billy Eckstine, Dizzy Gillespie, Marlon Brando, Charlie Wilson, Barry White, Chaka Khan, Töne Löc, Queen Latifah, Ray Charles, Greg Phillinganes, Siedah Garrett, Patti Austin, Will Wheaton, Mervyn Warren, Sarah Vaughan, Miles Davis, Gloria Estefan, Lelee, Charlie Parker, Shaquille O'Neal, Bono			1:32
2	"Let the Good Times Roll"	Stevie Wonder, Bono, Ray Charles	Sam Theard, Fleecie Moore	Jones, John Clayton	2:55
3	"Cool Joe, Mean Joe (Killer Joe)"	Töne Löc, Queen Latifah, Nancy Wilson	Music: Benny Golson; Lyrics: Quincy Jones; Rap: Queen Latifah	Jones, Sam Nestico, Jerry Hey, Paul Jackson Jr.	7:32
4	"You Put a Move on My Heart"	Tamia	Rod Temperton	Temperton, Clayton	6:13
5	"Rock with You"	Brandy, Heavy D	Music & Lyrics: Temperton; Rap: Heavy D	Jones, QDIII, Greg Phillinganes, Temperton	4:08
6	"Moody's Mood for Love"	Brian McKnight, Rachelle Ferrell, Take 6, James Moody	James Moody, Dorothy Fields, Eddie Jefferson	Jones, Mervyn Warren, Mark Kibble	4:18
7	"Stomp"	Luke Cresswell, Fiona Wilkes, Carl Smith, Fraser Morrison, Everett Bradley, Mr. X, Melle Mel, Coolio, Yo-Yo, Chaka Khan, Charlie Wilson, Shaquille O'Neal, Luniz	Music & Lyrics: Louis Johnson, George Johnson, Valerie Johnson, Temperton; Intro & Link: Melle Mel; Raps: Coolio, Yo-Yo, Shaquille O'Neal, Luniz	Jones, Temperton, Hey	6:16
8	"Jook Joint" (Reprise)	Ray Charles, Funkmaster Flex		Jones, Clayton	0:56
9	"Do Nothin' Till You Hear from Me"	Phil Collins	Music: Duke Ellington; Lyrics: Bob Russell	Jones, Nestico	3:57
10	"Is It Love That We're Missing"	Gloria Estefan, Warren Wiebe	Music & Lyrics: George Johnson, Debbie Smith; Spanish Lyrics: Gloria Estefan	Jones, Phillinganes, Warren, QDIII, Hey	4:45
11	"Heaven's Girl"	R. Kelly, Ron Isley, Aaron Hall, Charlie Wilson, Naomi Campbell	R. Kelly	Jones, R. Kelly, Hey, Temperton	5:26
12	"Stuff Like That"	Charlie Wilson, Ray Charles, Brandy, Chaka Khan, Ashford & Simpson	Jones, Valerie Simpson, Nick Ashford, Eric Gale, Steve Gadd, Richard Tee, Ralph MacDonald	Jones, Phillinganes, Hey, Johnny Mandel, QDIII	5:45
13	"Slow Jams"	SWV, Babyface, Portrait, Barry White	Temperton	Temperton, Clayton, Phillinganes, Hey	7:30
14	"At the End of the Day (Grace)"	Toots Thielemans, Barry White, Mervyn Warren	Jones, Jeremy Lubbock	Jones, Warren, Hey	7:42
15	"Jook Joint" (Outro)	Barry White, Tamia, Toots Thielemans			0:49

== Personnel ==
Musicians

- Nick Ashford – background vocals (12)
- Patti Austin – background vocals (3, 7, 10, 12)
- Alex Brown – background vocals (4, 13)
- George Bohanon – trombone 2, 4, 9, 12, 13)
- Edwin Bonilla – percussion (10)
- Oscar Brashear – trumpet (2, 4, 12, 13)
- Ray Brown – trumpet (4, 13)
- Sekou Bunch – bass guitar (2, 12)
- Bridgette Bryant – background vocals (4)
- Pete Christlieb – saxophone (2, 4, 9, 12, 13), tenor saxophone solo (2)
- Jeff Clayton – saxophone (2, 4, 9, 12, 13)
- John Clayton – conductor (2, 4, 9, 13)
- Paulinho da Costa – percussion (12, 13)
- Gloria Estefan – background vocals (10)
- Brandon Fields – saxophone solo (11)
- Chuck Findley – trumpet (2, 9, 12)
- David Foster – keyboards (6)
- Simon Franglen – synthesizer programming (5–7, 9, 10, 12–14)
- Siedah Garrett – background vocals (3–5, 7, 10, 12, 13)
- Grant Geissman – guitar solo (2)
- Gary Grant – trumpet (2–4, 7, 9, 12, 13)
- Mark Hammond – drum programming (14)
- Herbie Hancock – keyboards (10), Lyne LN-1000 keyboard solo (3), keyboard solo (7)
- Erik Hanson – drum programming (4, 7), synthesizer programming (4, 6, 7, 13)
- Keith Henderson – guitar (11)
- Jerry Hey – trumpet (2–4, 7, 9, 12, 13), trumpet solo (9), synthesizer programming (5, 10, 11, 13)
- Dan Higgins – saxophone (3, 9, 12)
- Rob "Phydeaux" Hoffman – keyboards (5), drum programming (13)
- Kim Hutchcroft – saxophone (3, 7, 12, 13)
- Fred Jackson Jr. – saxophone (2, 4, 9, 13)
- Paul Jackson Jr. – guitar (2–5, 7, 13)
- Tommy Johnson – tuba (9, 12)
- Quincy Jones – drum programming (6)
- Randy Kerber – keyboards (7), synthesizer programming (6, 7, 9–11)
- Hubert Laws – flute solo (3)
- Charlie Loper – trombone (2, 4, 9, 12, 13)
- Luís Miguel – background vocals (10)
- Peter Mokran – drum and synthesizer programming (11)
- James Moody – saxophone solo (6)
- Jack Nimitz – saxophone (2, 4, 9, 12, 13)
- The Willie "Cognac" Norwood United Children's Choir – background vocals (12)
- Greg Phillinganes – keyboards (2–6, 9, 10, 12, 13), synthesizers (14), synthesizer bass (7, 10), synthesizer programming (5), keyboard solo (13)
- Steve Porcaro – drum programming (3)
- Portrait – background vocals (7, 13)
  - Michael Angelo Saulsberry
  - Eric Kirkland
  - Kurt Jackson
  - Irving Washington III
- QDIII – drum programing (4, 5, 7, 10, 12), keyboards (5)
- Joshua Redman – saxophone solo (3, 9)
- Bill Reichenbach – trombone (2–4, 7, 9, 12, 13)
- John Robinson – drums (2–4, 6, 7, 9, 10, 13), drum programming (12)
- Tom Scott – saxophone (2, 4, 13)
- Valerie Simpson – background vocals (12)
- Stan the Guitar Man – guitar (5)
- Neil Stubenhaus – bass guitar (3, 4, 6, 9, 13)
- Style – background vocals (7)
  - Reginald Bell
  - Rodney Chambers
  - Richard Redd
  - Andre Scott
- SWV – background vocals (13)
  - Cheryl Gamble
  - Tamara Johnson
  - Leanne Lyons
- Lisa Taylor – background vocals (13)
- Rod Temperton – keyboards (4, 5, 7), percussion (13)
- Michael Thompson – guitar (9, 14), guitar ensemble (10), guitar solo (10)
- Rick Todd – French horn (9, 12)
- Ian Underwood – synthesizer programming (10, 12)
- Brad Warnaar – French horn (9, 12)
- Mervyn Warren – keyboards (6), synthesizers (14), synthesizer bass (14), background vocals (7, 10, 12)
- Wah Wah Watson – guitar (5, 9, 12), talk box (12)
- Bob Watt – French horn (9, 12)
- Kirk Whalum – saxophone solo (12)
- Will Wheaton – background vocals (7, 10, 12)
- Greg Williams – French horn (9, 12)
- Larry Williams – saxophone (3, 7, 12, 13)
- Stevie Wonder – harmonica solo (2)
- Reggie Young – trombone (2, 4, 9, 12, 13)
- Snooky Young – trumpet (2, 4, 13)

Technical personnel

- Francis Buckley – engineer
- Stephanie Gylden – assistant engineer, additional engineering, technical director
- Bruce Swedien – mixing
- Rob Hoffman – mixing assistant
- Tommy Vicari – mixing (1, 5, 8, 10, 15)
- Al Schmitt – big band engineer
- Jess Sutcliffe, Jon Wolfson, Chris Tergesen, Paul Barrett, Louis McCormick, Victor Giordano, Rich Rauh, Henk Korff, Eric Schilling, Rob "Phydeaux" Hoffman, Nigel Crowley, Chris Fogel, Ted Blaisdell, Brian Carrigan – additional engineering
- Mike Scotella, Mike Stock, Gerardo Lopez, Kyle Bess, Brandon Harris, David Nottingham, Bill Smith, Gus Garces, Charlie Paakari, Terri Wong, Leslie Ann Jones, Dave Schiffman, Ross Hogarth, Rich Hureda, Brooks Larsen, Victor McCoy, Chris Brooks, Chad Fredirici, Dylan Carter, Ghery Fimbres, Stephen George – assistant engineers
- Bernie Grundman – mastering
- James Flaubert, Steve Dewey, Andrew Scheps – sound design (1, 8, 15)
- Paul Barrett – Bono vocal producer (2)

== Charts ==
=== Weekly charts ===
Chart (1995)	Peak position
US Billboard 200	32
US Top Jazz Albums (Billboard)	1
US Top R&B/Hip-Hop Albums (Billboard)	6

=== Year-end charts ===
Chart (1996)	Position
US Billboard 200	92
US Top R&B/Hip-Hop Albums (Billboard)	20

== Certifications ==
Region	Certification	Certified units/sales
United States (RIAA)	Platinum	1,000,000^{^}
^{^} Shipments figures based on certification alone.

== See also ==
- Quincy Jones discography
