= Give Me You (Tamia song) =

Single by Tamia

from the album Beautiful Surprise
- Released: August 2012
- Genre: R&B
- Length: 3:34
- Label: Plus One
- Songwriters: Andre Brissett; Claude Kelly
- Producers: Andre Brissett; Claude Kelly

Tamia singles chronology
"Beautiful Surprise" (2012)	"Give Me You" (2012)	"Sandwich and a Soda" (2015)

"Give Me You" is a song by Canadian recording artist Tamia. It was written and produced by Claude Kelly and Andre Brissett for her fifth studio album Beautiful Surprise (2012). Released as the album's second and final single in the United States, it reached number 19 on the US Billboard Adult R&B Songs chart.

== Track listing ==
Digital download

- "Give Me You" – 3:34

== Credits and personnel ==
Credits adapted from the liner notes of Beautiful Surprise.

- Andre Brissett – production, writer
- Ben Chang – engineering
- Tamia Hill – backing vocals, lead vocals
- Claude Kelly – production, writer
- Manny Marroquin – mixing
- Conrad "Connie" Martin – engineering assistance

== Charts ==
Chart (2012–2014)	Peak position
South Korea International (Circle)	54
US Adult R&B Songs (Billboard)	19
