= Can't Go for That =

2000 single by Tamia

Single by Tamia

from the album A Nu Day
- B-side: "Tell Me Who"
- Released: August 1, 2000
- Length: 3:48
- Label: Elektra
- Songwriters: Melissa Elliott; Brycyn Evans; Roosevelt Harrel; Sara Allen; Daryl Hall; John Oates
- Producers: Bink; Missy "Misdemeanor" Elliott (co-prod.); Evans (co-prod.)

Tamia singles chronology
"Spend My Life with You" (1999)	"Can't Go for That" (2000)	"Stranger in My House" (2001)

"Can't Go for That" is a song by Canadian recording artist Tamia. It was written by Missy "Misdemeanor" Elliott, Brycyn Evans and Roosevelt "Bink" Harrell for her second studio album A Nu Day (2000), featuring main production from the latter with Elliott and Evans serving as co-producers. Musically, the song includes an interpolation of "I Can't Go For That (No Can Do)" as performed by Hall & Oates.

"Can't Go for That" was first released as the album's lead single on August 1, 2000 to Rhythmic contemporary radio and peaked at number 84 on the US Billboard Hot 100 and 23 on Billboard's Hot R&B/Hip-Hop Singles & Tracks chart. The single was remixed by Jonathan Peters. There is another remix version as the album bonus track which features 213 members Nate Dogg, Snoop Dogg and Warren G.

== Music video ==
A music video for "Can't Go for That" was directed by Chris Hafner in the week of July 1, 2000. It was filmed in Los Angeles.

== Track listings ==
US CD single
No.	Title	Writer(s)	Producer(s)	Length
1.	"Can't Go for That" (Album Version)	Melissa Elliott; Brycyn Evans; Roosevelt Harrel; Sara Allen; Daryl Hall; John Oates	Bink; Elliott^{[a]}; Evans^{[a]}	3:52
2.	"Tell Me Who" (Album Version)	Shep Crawford; Tamia Washington	Crawford	4:51
3.	"Can't Go for That" (Music video)			3:54
4.	"Behind the Scenes Video"

US CD maxi single
No.	Title	Writer(s)	Producer(s)	Length
1.	"Can't Go for That" (Album Version)	Elliott; Evans; Harrel; Allen; Hall; Oates	Bink; Elliott^{[a]}; Evans^{[a]}	3:52
2.	"Can't Go for That" (Jonathan Peters' Sound Factory Mix @ 127 BPM)	Elliott; Evans; Harrel; Allen; Hall; Oates	Bink; Elliott^{[a]}; Evans^{[a]}; Jonathan Peters^{[b]}	8:50
3.	"Can't Go for That" (Jonathan Peters' Trance Mix)	Elliott; Evans; Harrel; Allen; Hall; Oates	Bink; Elliott^{[a]}; Evans^{[a]}; Peters^{[b]}	8:22
4.	"Can't Go for That" (Jonathan Peters' Club Mix @ 133 BPM)	Elliott; Evans; Harrel; Allen; Hall; Oates	Bink; Elliott^{[a]}; Evans^{[a]}; Peters^{[b]}	8:27
5.	"Can't Go for That" (Instrumental)	Elliott; Evans; Harrel; Allen; Hall; Oates	Bink; Elliott^{[a]}; Evans^{[a]}; Peters^{[b]}	3:50
6.	"Can't Go for That" (Album Version)	Elliott; Evans; Harrel; Allen; Hall; Oates	Bink; Elliott^{[a]}; Evans^{[a]}; Peters^{[b]}	4:51

Notes

- ^{^[a]} denotes co-producer
- ^{^[b]} denotes additional producer

== Credits and personnel ==
Credits adapted from the liner notes of A Nu Day.

- Co-producer – Brycyn Evans, Missy Elliott
- Assistant engineer – Edith Luis
- Mixing, recording – Bill Importico
- Producer – Bink!

== Charts ==
=== Weekly charts ===
Chart (2000)	Peak position
US Billboard Hot 100	84
US Dance Singles Sales (Billboard)	12
US Hot R&B/Hip-Hop Songs (Billboard)	23
