= Slow Jams =

1996 single by Quincy Jones

Single by Quincy Jones featuring Babyface and Tamia with Portrait and Barry White

from the album Q's Jook Joint
- Released: 1996
- Length: 4:28
- Label: Qwest
- Songwriter: Rod Temperton
- Producer: Quincy Jones

Tamia singles chronology
"You Put a Move on My Heart" (1995)	"Slow Jams" (1996)	"Missing You" (1996)

"Slow Jams" is a song by American musician Quincy Jones from his 1995 studio album, Q's Jook Joint. Written by Rod Temperton and produced by Jones, vocals for the song were initially recorded by Babyface, Portrait, Barry White and SWV. A remix version, released in 1996 as the album's second single, replaced SWV's vocals with Tamia's.

A commercial success, "Slow Jams" peaked at number two on the New Zealand Singles Chart and reached the top 20 on the US Billboard Hot R&B Singles chart. The original version featuring SWV earned a nomination for Best R&B Performance by a Duo or Group with Vocals at the 39th Grammy Awards in 1997.

== Charts ==
=== Weekly charts ===
Chart (1996)	Peak position
New Zealand (Recorded Music NZ)	2
US Billboard Hot 100	68
US Hot R&B/Hip-Hop Songs (Billboard)	19

=== Year-end charts ===
Chart (1996)	Position
New Zealand (RIANZ)	18
US Hot R&B Singles (Billboard)	78

== Certifications ==
Region	Certification	Certified units/sales
New Zealand (RMNZ)	Platinum	10,000^{*}
^{*} Sales figures based on certification alone.
