= Officially Missing You =

Single by Tamia

from the album More
- Released: September 30, 2003
- Genre: R&B
- Length: 4:01
- Label: Elektra
- Songwriter: Marcus Vest
- Producer: 7 Aurelius

Tamia singles chronology
"Into You" (2003)	"Officially Missing You" (2003)	"Questions" (2004)

"Officially Missing You" is a song by Canadian R&B recording artist Tamia, taken from her third studio album, More (2004). Released as the album's lead single, it was written by Marcus Vest, better known by his stage name Seven Aurelius. The song is marked by its acoustic style featuring acoustic guitar and Tamia's vocals most prominently in the mix. "Officially Missing You" peaked at number one on the US Adult R&B Songs chart. In South Korea, the song peaked at number 6 on the International Digital Chart, selling 482,077 units between 2011 and 2013. (Note: Cumulative sales of "Officially Missing You" in South Korea: 2011: 206,058; 2012: 161,103; 2013: 114,916)

== Background ==
"Officially Missing You" was written and produced by 7 Aurelius. A melancholic lament that is built around an acoustic guitar, it marked a departure for Aurelius who was primarily known for his hip hop productions up to then. In an interview with Billboard, Tamia remarked that she was initially nervous about working with him, saying: "It was different than what I thought he was going to bring. But when we met in the studio, we instantly clicked. The song was very bare — just a guitar and a click track. That's the best way to record, because you can really put emotion in there."

== Music video ==
The music video for "Officially Missing You" was filmed by American director Paul Hunter.

== Track listings ==
CD single
No.	Title	Producer(s)	Length
1.	"Officially Missing You" (album version)	7 Aurelius	4:02
2.	"Officially Missing You" (MIDI Mafia remix)	7 Aurelius; Midi Mafia^{[a]}	3:24
3.	"Officially Missing You" (Rizzo Global club mix)	7 Aurelius; Mike Rizzo^{[a]}	7:05
4.	"Officially Missing You" (Rizzo Sexy radio)	7 Aurelius; Rizzo^{[a]}	3:50
5.	"Officially Missing You" (Felix's Hechtic club mix)	7 Aurelius; Felix Hechtic^{[a]}	6:22
6.	"Officially Missing You" (Felix's Hechtic dub mix)	7 Aurelius; Hechtic^{[a]}	6:22

Notes

- ^{^[a]} denotes additional producer

== Credits and personnel ==
Credits adapted from the liner notes of More.

- Arrangement, production – 7 Aurelius
- Bass – Al Carty
- Guitar – Ricardo Ramos
- Mixing, recording – Glen Marchese
- Percussion – Bashiri Johnson
- Strings arrangement – Larry Gold

== Charts ==
=== Weekly charts ===
Chart (2003)	Peak position
Canada (Nielsen SoundScan)	32
US Billboard Hot 100	83
US Dance Club Songs (Billboard) remixes	4
US Dance Singles Sales (Billboard) remixes	1
US Dance/Mix Show Airplay (Billboard)	40
US Hot R&B/Hip-Hop Songs (Billboard)	31
US Rhythmic Airplay (Billboard)	35

Chart (2011)	Peak position
South Korea International (Circle)	17

Chart (2013)	Peak position
South Korea International (Circle)	6

Chart (2014)	Peak position
South Korea International (Circle)	16

=== Year-end charts ===
Chart (2003)	Position
US Hot R&B/Hip-Hop Songs (Billboard)	87

== Certifications ==
Certifications for "Officially Missing You"
Region	Certification	Certified units/sales
New Zealand (RMNZ)	Platinum	30,000^{‡}
^{‡} Sales+streaming figures based on certification alone.
