= Street Dreams (Fabolous album) =

2003 album by Fabolous

Studio album by Fabolous
- Released: March 4, 2003
- Genre: Hip hop
- Length: 79:42
- Labels: Desert Storm; Elektra
- Producers: DJ Clue; Heavy D; DURO; Mr. Fingaz; Just Blaze; Linx; DJ Matty Kats; LZ; Madd Phunk; Omen; Precision; Rick Rock; Trackmasters; Kanye West

Fabolous chronology
Ghetto Fabolous (2001)	Street Dreams (2003)	Real Talk (2004)

Singles from Street Dreams
- 1. "This Is My Party" Released: March 24, 2003; 2. "Can't Let You Go" Released: May 27, 2003; 3. "Into You" Released: July 15, 2003

Street Dreams is the second studio album by American rapper Fabolous. It was released on March 4, 2003, by Desert Storm Records and Elektra Records. Fabolous worked with a variety of producers on the album, including DJ Clue, Heavy D, Just Blaze, Rick Rock, Trackmasters, and Kanye West. Guest vocalists on Street Dreams include Lil' Mo, Mike Shorey, Paul Cain, Snoop Dogg, Missy Elliott, Ashanti, and Mary J. Blige as well as Styles P, Jadakiss, M.O.P., P. Diddy, and Jagged Edge.

The album was received moderately from a critical standpoint and was a commercial success. It reached number three on the US Billboard 200, with 185,000 copies sold in its first week. Street Dreams had four charting singles. Produced by Just Blaze and guest vocals from Lil' Mo and Mike Shorey, "Can't Let You Go" reached number one on the Rhythmic Top 40, and number four on the US Billboard Hot 100 chart. "Into You" with the help of Ashanti/Tamia also reached number four on the Billboard Hot 100. The remix of "Trade It All", which featured P. Diddy and Jagged Edge reached number 20 on the chart.

== Critical reception ==
Professional ratings
Aggregate scores
Source	Rating
Metacritic	51/100
Review scores
Source	Rating
AllMusic	2.5/5 stars
Blender	4/5 stars
E!	B−
Entertainment Weekly	D
HipHopDX	4/5 stars
RapReviews	6.5/10
Mojo	3/5 stars
Q	3/5 stars
Rolling Stone	2/5 stars
Stylus	D+

Street Dreams was met with "mixed or average" reviews from critics. At Metacritic, which assigns a weighted average rating out of 100 to reviews from mainstream publications, this release received an average score of 51 based on 13 reviews. Billboard found that Street Dreams was a "little too padded for its own good, and a handful of tracks suffer from all-too-familiar samples that have been used in recent hits by other artists. Luckily for the Brooklyn, N.Y.-based rapper, the appeal of the album's best moments, coupled with its star power, compensate for any shortcomings." Nathan Rabin from The A.V. Club called the album "disappointing" and wrote: "While a delight on guest appearances, he has yet to prove that he can construct memorable songs, let alone a solid album. Fabolous may not be in Jay-Z's league lyrically, but as a conspicuous consumer, he's poised to give the Roc-A-Fella big shot a run for his money." Entertainment Weekly's Ta-Nehisi Coates found that "the ideas are thin and the beats thinner [...] Fabolous himself comes off as being lighter than Jared from Subway — with all of Jay-Z’s arrogance, but none of his charisma."

== Commercial performance ==
Street Dreams debuted at number three on the US Billboard 200 with 185,000 copies sold in its first week. This became Fabolous' second US top-ten debut. In its second week, the album dropped to number seven on the chart, selling an additional 92,600 copies. In its third week, the album dropped to number eight on the chart, selling 64,000 more copies. On September 22, 2003, the album was certified platinum by the Recording Industry Association of America (RIAA) for sales of over a million copies. As of August 2004, the album sold over 1.3 million copies in the United States, according to Nielsen Soundscan.

== Track listing ==
No.	Title	Writer(s)	Producer(s)	Length
1.	"Intro"		DJ Clue	0:17
2.	"Not Give a Fuck"	John Jackson; Rick Rock	Rock	3:18
3.	"Damn"	Jackson; Jean-Claude Olivier; Samuel Barnes	Trackmasters	3:24
4.	"Call Me"	Jackson; Olivier; Barnes; Dwight Myers	Trackmasters; Heavy D	3:44
5.	"Can't Let You Go" (featuring Lil' Mo & Mike Shorey)	Jackson; Cynthia Loving; Justin Smith	Just Blaze; E-Bass^{[a]}	3:43
6.	"Bad Bitch"	Jackson; Larry Gates	Precision; DJ Matty Kats	3:37
7.	"Why Wouldn't I" (featuring Paul Cain)	Jackson; Cain; Sidney Brown	Omen	4:58
8.	"Up On Things" (featuring Snoop Dogg)	Jackson; Ernesto Shaw; Ken Ifill	DJ Clue; DURO	3:42
9.	"Sickalicious" (featuring Missy Elliott)	Jackson; Melissa Elliott; Chad Elliott	C. Elliot	4:03
10.	"This Is My Party"	Jackson; L. Gaye; Taiwan Green	Linx; Mr. Fingaz	4:32
11.	"Into You" (featuring Ashanti)	Jackson; Tim Kelley; Bon Robinson; Lionel Richie; Ronald LaPread	DJ Clue; DURO	4:34
12.	"Change You or Change Me"	Jackson; Brown	Omen	4:31
13.	"Respect"	Jackson; Laban Reeves	LZ	4:09
14.	"Forgive Me Father"	Jackson; Gaye	Linx; Mr. Fingaz	4:20
15.	"Never Duplicated"	Jackson; Keith Wilkins; Gerard Harmon	Madd Phunk	4:00
16.	"My Life" (featuring Mary J. Blige)	Jackson; Kanye West	West	4:24

Bonus track(s)
No.	Title	Writer(s)	Producer(s)	Length
17.	"Throw Back"	Jackson; Shaw; Ifill	DJ Clue; DURO	3:45
18.	"Keepin It Gangsta (Remix)" (featuring Styles P, Jadakiss, M.O.P. & Paul Cain)	Jackson; Jamal Grinnage; Eric Murray; David Styles; Jason Phillips	DJ Clue; DURO	5:09
19.	"Trade It All (Part 2)" (featuring P. Diddy & Jagged Edge)	Jackson; Brian Casey; Chauncey Hawkins; Shaw; Ifill	DJ Clue; DURO	4:34
20.	"Into You" (featuring Tamia)	Jackson; Kelley; Robinson; Richie; LaPread	DJ Clue; DURO	4:54

Notes

- ^{^[a]} signifies additional producer

Sample credits

- "Damn" samples from "Rapper's Delight" (1979) as written by Bernard Edwards and Nile Rodgers, and performed by The Sugarhill Gang.
- "Bad Bitch" embodies portions of "Set It Off" (1984) as written by Steve Standard, and performed by Strafe.
- "Sickalicious" embodies portions of "Reelin' In the Years" (1973) as written by Walter Becker and Donald Fagen, and performed by Steely Dan.
- "Into You" contains an interpolation of "So Into You" (1998) as written by Tim Kelley and Bob Robinson, and performed by Tamia.
- "My Life" contains an interpolation of "Very Special" (1981) as written by Lisa Peters and William Jeffrey, and performed by Debra Laws.

== Charts ==
=== Weekly charts ===
Weekly chart performance for Street Dreams
Chart (2003)	Peak position
Australian Albums (ARIA Charts)	82
Australian Urban Albums (ARIA)	14
Canadian Albums (Nielsen SoundScan)	38
Canadian R&B Albums (Nielsen SoundScan)	15
Dutch Albums (Album Top 100)	34
French Albums (SNEP)	120
UK Albums (Official Charts)	51
UK R&B Albums (Official Charts)	4
US Billboard 200	3
US Top R&B/Hip-Hop Albums (Billboard)	3

=== Year-end charts ===
Year-end chart performance for Street Dreams
Chart (2003)	Position
UK Albums (OCC)	161
US Billboard 200	55
US Top R&B/Hip-Hop Albums (Billboard)	21

== Certifications ==
Sales and certifications for Street Dreams
Region	Certification	Certified units/sales
United Kingdom (BPI)	Gold	100,000^{^}
United States (RIAA)	Platinum	1,000,000^{^}
^{^} Shipments figures based on certification alone.
