= You Put a Move on My Heart =

1993 song by Mica Paris

Song by Mica Paris

from the album Whisper a Prayer
- Released: June 8, 1993
- Genre: R&B; soul
- Length: 6:06
- Label: Island Records, 4th & Broadway
- Songwriter: Rod Temperton
- Producer: Rod Temperton

Whisper a Prayer track listing
- 12 tracks: 1. "I Never Felt Like This Before"; 2. "I Wanna Hold on to You"; 3. "You Put a Move on My Heart"; 4. "We Were Made for Love"; 5. "Whisper a Prayer"; 6. "Too Far Apart"; 7. "I Bless the Day"; 8. "Two in a Million"; 9. "Positivity"; 10. "Can't Seem to Make Up My Mind"; 11. "You Got a Special Way"; 12. "Love Keeps Coming Back"

"You Put a Move on My Heart" is a song by British recording artist Mica Paris, written and produced by Rod Temperton for her third studio Whisper a Prayer (1993).

== Reception ==
Though not released as a single, the song received general acclaim from critics. Andrew Hamilton of Allmusic expressed, 'Mica Paris' original rendition of Rod Temperton's ballad supreme [...] shames Tamia's more successful rendition'. Hamilton also described the tone of her voice as 'glorious', writing, it 'never pales; it glows like a warm fire as the devastating British woman squeezes the last drop of soul from the lyrics.'

Whilst Entertainment Weekly writer James Earl Hardy described the song as 'sexy R&B', Daryl Easlea of the BBC called it 'beautiful and passionately delivered' he also expressed, 'you long for it being recorded at a different time, not with Paris in front of a keyboard with an orchestra setting button and a drum machine'.

== Quincy Jones version ==
"You Put a Move on My Heart"

Single by Quincy Jones featuring Tamia

from the album Q's Jook Joint
- B-side: "Let the Good Times Roll"
- Released: December 2, 1995
- Recorded: 1995
- Genre: R&B; soul
- Length: 6:13
- Label: Qwest
- Songwriter: Rod Temperton
- Producer: Quincy Jones

Tamia singles chronology
"You Put a Move on My Heart" (1995)	"Slow Jams" (1996)

In 1994, Canadian singer Tamia performed at a multiple sclerosis benefit in Aspen, Colorado when she met music manager, Lionel Richie's ex-wife Brenda Richie, who was co-sponsoring the event and introduced herself to Tamia after the show. A few months later, Tamia, who was being courted by Warner Bros. Records at the time, called Richie to say that she was coming to Los Angeles for a photo session, resulting in her lasting stay and a management deal with Richie.

Weeks later, Richie arranged for her to perform at a star-studded party that she held for singer Luther Vandross. Her performance reportedly impressed all in attendance, including veteran producer Quincy Jones, who later offered her the chance to appear on his album, Q's Jook Joint (1995). Overwhelmed by his offer, Tamia recorded vocals for "You Put a Move on My Heart", which Jones later selected as the album's first single. A moderate commercial success, the collaboration earned acclaim from critics; it was later nominated for a Grammy Award.

=== Charts ===
Chart (1995)	Peak position
US Billboard Hot 100	98
US Hot R&B/Hip-Hop Songs (Billboard)	16
