= Beautiful Surprise (song) =

2012 single by Tamia

Single by Tamia

from the album Beautiful Surprise
- Released: March 2, 2012
- Genre: R&B
- Length: 3:37
- Label: Plus One
- Songwriters: Tamia Hill; Claude Kelly; Salaam Remi
- Producer: Salaam Remi

Tamia singles chronology
"Almost" (2007)	"Beautiful Surprise" (2012)	"Give Me You" (2012)

"Beautiful Surprise" is a song by Canadian recording artist Tamia. It was written by Claude Kelly, Salaam Remi and the singer herself for her same-titled fifth album (2012), while production was overseen by Remi. The last song to be recorded for Beautiful Surprise, the R&B song has a breezy mid-tempo groove that is structured around a smooth synth. Lyrically, the song is an ode to her family, husband Grant Hill and her two daughters Myla and Lael, on which she sings about how happy she is to have experienced an unexpected but fulfilling love with a man.

The track was released as the album's lead single in the United States on March 2, 2012. It received a mixed to positive reception from music critics, who complimented Tamia's vocals on "Beautiful Surprise" as well as the joyful nature of the song. "Beautiful Surprise" reached number 24 on the US Hot R&B/Hip-Hop Songs and entered the top five of the Adult R&B Songs, peaking at number four. It received a nomination for Grammy Award for Best R&B Song at the 55th Annual Grammy Awards, held in February 2013. A music video for "Beautiful Surprise" was directed by Ryan Pallotta.

== Background ==
"Beautiful Surprise" was written by Tamia, Claude Kelly, and Salaam Remi, while production was helmed Remi. The trio hunkered down in the Chalice Studios in Los Angeles to work on material for Tamia's fifth album, with "Beautiful Surprise" becoming the last song to be recorded for the project. According to Kelly they were "just kicking ideas around and we wanted to have a romantic song but an underlying message of what she is about. Obviously, she is married to Grant Hill and they both have working schedules. And we said… 'Let’s celebrate the marriage and what it’s like to come off the road and surprise you. Let’s do ‘Beautiful Surprise.'” The song was finished in about 45 minutes.

== Critical reception ==
In his review for the same-titled parent album, Jon Caramanica found that "Beautiful Surprise" was out of several tracks on the album that nod "at the dance floor while never really stepping onto it. Of these, the title track [...] hits hardest, juxtaposing restrained boom-bap against Tamia’s pretty fluttering." Mark Edward Nero from About.com remarked that the song was "a prime example of how underrated her vocal strength is." It had Tamia singing "sweetly" over "a moderately uptempo beat." Richard Spadine, writing for DJBooth, felt that the "track finds Salaam Remi serving up a smooth synth beat as Tamia expresses her joy at finding herself in the arms of the man she loves upon waking up in the morning." He called it "one of many quality tunes to be found on the singer's fifth studio album." Associated Press cited "Beautiful Surprise" as "one of the album's shortcomings," calling it "lukewarm."

== Music video ==
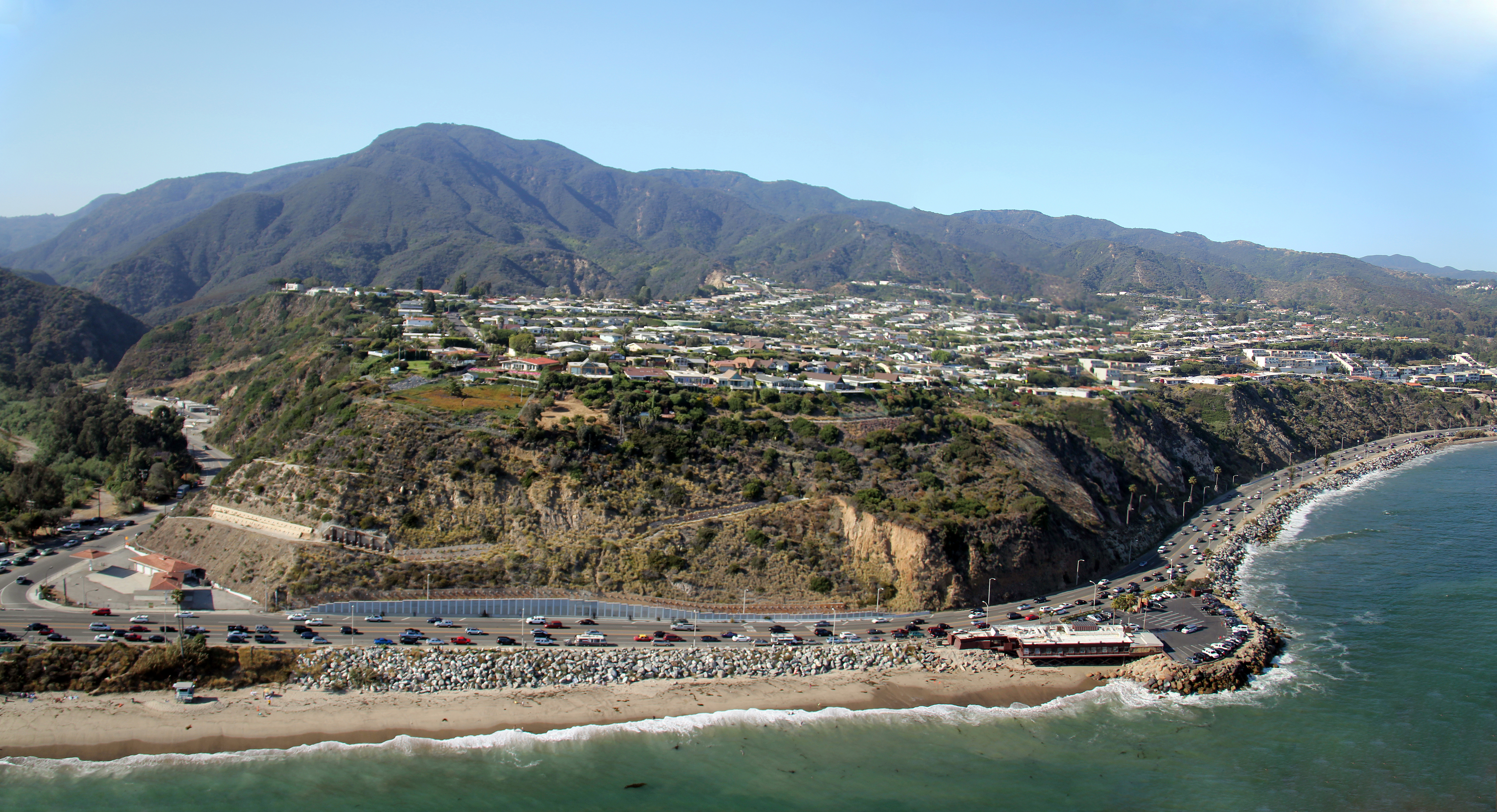
The music video for "Beautiful Surprise" was filmed at a mansion in the hills of Malibu.

The accompanying music video for "Beautiful Surprise" was directed by Canadian filmmaker Ryan Pallotta. Filmed at a mansion in Malibu, it was shot along with the photography for the album artwork of parent album Beautiful Surprise. A plotless performance video that consists of several editorial shots, is deptics Tamia in different locations of the house, dressed in "simple, sexy and chic" fashion. The video co-stars her husband Grant Hill who depicts a ghost-like entity. On their decision to include him in the video, she commented: “After twelve years of marriage, he finally made it into one of my videos. I told him, ‘This is your chance, boo.’"

== Track listing ==
Digital download

- "Beautiful Surprise" – 3:37

== Credits and personnel ==
Credits adapted from the liner notes of Beautiful Surprise.

- Ben Chang – engineering
- Tamia Hill – backing vocals, writer
- Claude Kelly – backing vocals, writer
- Manny Marroquin – mixing
- Salaam Remi – production, writer

== Charts ==
=== Weekly charts ===
Weekly chart performance for "Beautiful Surprise"
Chart (2012)	Peak position
US Hot R&B/Hip-Hop Songs (Billboard)	24

=== Year-end charts ===
Year-end chart performance for "Beautiful Surprise"
Chart (2012)	Position
US Adult R&B Songs (Billboard)	6
US Hot R&B/Hip-Hop Songs (Billboard)	75
