= Tamia =

Canadian singer and songwriter (born 1975)

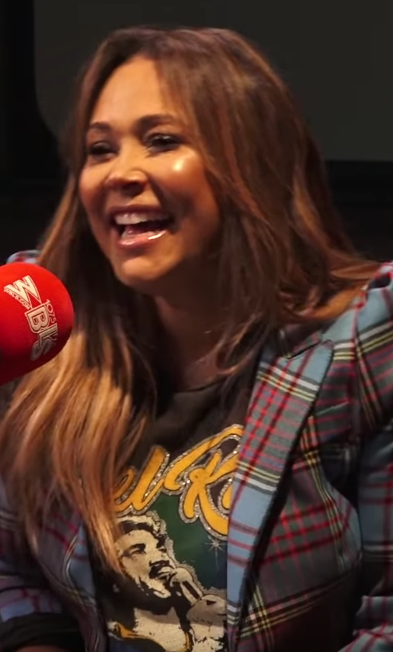
- Tamia during an interview in September 2018
- Born: Tamia Marilyn Washington; May 9, 1975 (age 51); Windsor, Ontario, Canada
- Occupations: Singer; songwriter; record producer
- Years active: 1993–present
- Spouse: Grant Hill (m. 1999)
- Children: 2
- Musical career
- Genres: R&B; soul; gospel
- Labels: Def Jam; Elektra
- Website: tamiaworld.com

Tamia Marilyn Washington Hill (born May 9, 1975) is a Canadian singer and songwriter. Born and raised in Windsor, Ontario, Tamia performed in various singing and dancing competitions as a child. In 1994, after signing a development deal with Warner Bros. Records, she was asked by veteran producer Quincy Jones to appear on his album Q's Jook Joint (1995), earning her Grammy Award nominations for their collaboration on "You Put a Move on My Heart" and "Slow Jams". Her self-titled debut album was released in 1998 and followed by a series of successful albums with Elektra Records, including A Nu Day (2000) and More (2004). Several songs from these albums became hit singles on the pop and R&B record charts, including "So Into You", "Stranger in My House", and "Imagination", as well as her collaborations "Into You", "Missing You", and "Spend My Life with You".

Since her departure from Elektra, Tamia has released most of her projects independently on her own label Plus One Music Group, through ventures with Def Jam Recordings, eOne Music, and others. In 2015, her sixth album Love Life debuted and peaked at number two on Billboard's Top R&B/Hip-Hop Albums, becoming her highest-charting album on the chart. An NAACP Image Award recipient for her work with singer Eric Benét, Tamia is a six-time Grammy Award nominee and has been nominated for numerous other awards and accolades, including a Soul Train Music Award, a Source Award, and four Juno Awards. She has been married to former basketball player Grant Hill since 1999; they have two daughters. Diagnosed with multiple sclerosis in 2003, Tamia is an advocate for the National Multiple Sclerosis Society (NMSS) on behalf of others affected by the disease.

== Early life ==
Tamia Marilyn Washington was born on May 9, 1975, in Windsor, Ontario. The only daughter of a White father and Black mother, Barbara Washington-Peden, she has three younger brothers named Tiras, Tajhee, and Trajan. Washington-Peden gave birth to Tamia when she was 17 years old and raised her children as a single mom. Aside from the music she heard and sang at church, Tamia was exposed to diverse music from an early age by her mother. As early as age six, she was on stage singing at the local church, and by age 12, had already been involved in several musicals which helped hone her musical skills. Tamia studied piano and voice with renowned Windsor musician, Eugene Davis, who was also instrumental in encouraging her to pursue her vocal talent. It was not long before she was able to develop her skills in the Walkerville Centre for Creative Arts program for visual and performing arts students, introduced at Walkerville Collegiate Institute in Windsor.

Along with attending high school at Walkerville, she made several appearances in local theater and choral concerts before winning Canada's prestigious YTV Achievement Award for vocal performance in 1993. In 1994, Tamia performed at a multiple sclerosis benefit in Aspen, Colorado, when she met music manager, Lionel Richie's ex-wife Brenda, who was cosponsoring the event and introduced herself to Tamia after the show. A few months later, Tamia, who was being courted by Warner Bros. Records at the time, called Richie to say that she was coming to Los Angeles, California, for a photo session, resulting in her lasting stay and a management deal with Richie. Weeks later, Richie arranged for her to perform at a star-studded party that she held for singer Luther Vandross. Her performance reportedly impressed all in attendance, including veteran producer Quincy Jones, who took notice and later offered her the chance to appear on his album Q's Jook Joint (1995).

== Career ==
=== 1993–1999: Collaborations and Tamia ===
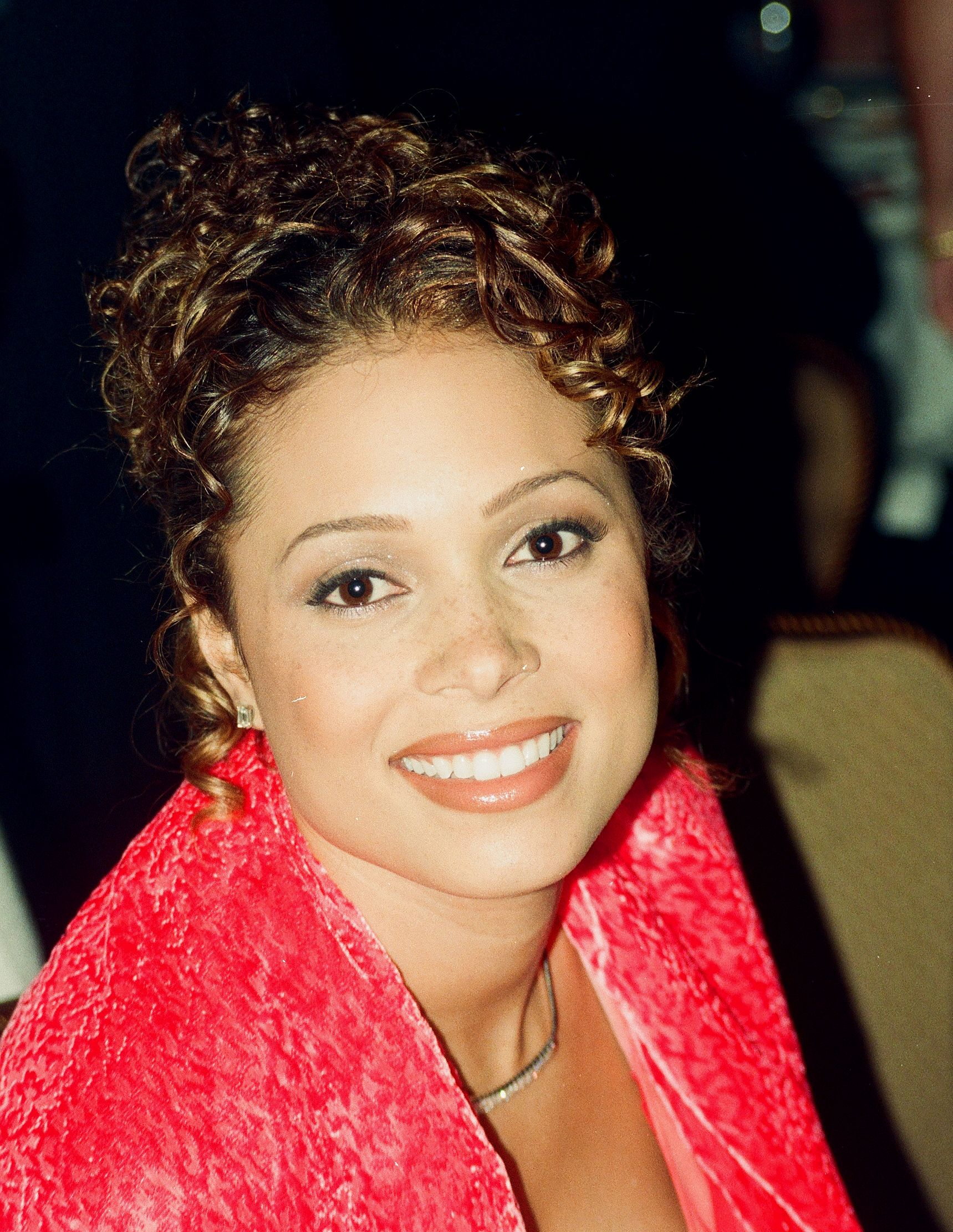
Tamia in 1998

"You Put a Move on My Heart", a Mica Paris cover, was one out of several Jones songs Tamia recorded vocals for. Selected as the first single from Q's Jook Joint, it became a moderate commercial success, reaching the top twenty of the US Billboard Hot R&B/Hip-Hop Songs, but earned acclaim from critics, resulting in a Grammy Award nomination for Best Female R&B Vocal Performance at the 39th ceremony. Tamia along with Babyface, Portrait, and Barry White received a second nomination that night for "Slow Jams", the second single from Jones' album, which fared similarly on the charts, peaking at number two on the New Zealand Singles Chart, and received a third nod in the Best Pop Collaboration with Vocals category for her performance on "Missing You", a collaboration with singers Brandy, Gladys Knight, and Chaka Khan for the soundtrack of the 1996 film Set It Off. A top thirty success on the US Billboard Hot 100, it was certified gold by the Recording Industry Association of America (RIAA).

In 1997, Tamia made her film debut in the action-thriller Speed 2: Cruise Control. Playing the cruise liner's musical entertainer, she performed the Diane Warren-penned single "Make Tonight Beautiful", which was released as part of the film's soundtrack. The same year, she has also appeared in television sitcoms such as Rock Me Baby and Kenan & Kel and recorded the all-star charity single "Love Shouldn't Hurt" for the National Committee for the Prevention of Child Abuse along with All-4-One, Michael Bolton, and others. Following this, Jones enlisted the services of several producers to work on Tamia's debut self-titled album, including Jermaine Dupri, Tim & Bob, and Mario Winans, many of which would become frequent producers on subsequent projects. Upon its April 1998 release, Tamia received a mixed to positive reception by critics, who complimented Tamia's vocal performance and the progression from her earlier recordings but found the material uneven. It debuted and peaked at number sixty-seven on the US Billboard 200. Five singles were released from the album, including the top twenty entries "Imagination" and "So Into You". In 1999, Tamia garnered her two Juno Award nominations for Best New Solo Artist and R&B/Soul Recording of the Year.

=== 1999–2005: A Nu Day and More ===
In 1999, Tamia collaborated with American singer Eric Benét on his single "Spend My Life with You". The song reached the top of Billboard's Hot R&B/Hip-Hop Songs chart and earned her a fourth Grammy Award nomination as well as the NAACP Image Award for Outstanding Song. Frustrated by Qwest's label politics, Tamia transitioned to Elektra Records the same year and began work on her second album A Nu Day. Rapper Missy Elliott, frequent co-producer Bink, Dallas Austin, and Shep Crawford worked with Tamia on the majority project, which she declared "not as ballad-driven as" her debut album and felt it was "more aggressive in terms of the formats of the songs". Released in October 2000, A Nu Day received a mixed response from critics, who complimented her more stylish sound but found the material inconsistent. It debuted and peaked at number forty-six on the Billboard 200 and became her first top ten entry on the Top R&B/Hip-Hop Albums, peaking at number eight. A steady seller, it reached gold status in the US and produced three of Tamia's commercially most successful singles, including her only US Billboard Hot 100 top ten hit single "Stranger in My House". In 2001, A Nu Day was nominated in the R&B/Soul Recording of the Year category at the annual Juno Awards.

In 2003, Tamia appeared on the international top ten hit "Into You", a collaboration with rapper Fabolous from his second studio album Street Dreams (2003) based on her 1998 single "So Into You". It reached the top five in Australia and the US and was followed by "Officially Missing You", the lead single from her third album. Initially titled Still, the project was indefinitely bumped from its original August 2003 schedule after Tamia's multiple sclerosis diagnosis and subsequent treatment. With the illness in remission, she resumed work later that year and arranged additional recording sessions to revamp parts of the album. Finally released in April 2004, More was released to generally mixed reception from music critics and debuted and peaked at number 17 on the US Billboard 200 and number four on the Top R&B/Hip-Hop Albums, with first week sales of 71,000 copies, marking the highest-selling and highest-charting opening of Tamia's catalogue yet. In support of More, Tamia was featured as a special guest on the Verizon Ladies First Tour, co-headlined by Beyoncé, Alicia Keys, and Missy Elliott, which became one of the biggest concert tours of the year. In 2005, More became Tamia's third consecutive album to earn a Juno Award nomination in the R&B/Soul Recording of the Year category.

=== 2005–2013: Between Friends and Beautiful Surprise ===
In order to gain more creative control over future projects, Tamia left Elektra amid its merger with Atlantic Records in 2005 and decided to go independent, founding her own record label Plus One Music Group. Unlike previous projects, she only consulted longtime contributor Shep Crawford to work with her on her fourth studio album. A rather intimate process, the pair met on a daily basis in a recording studio in Orlando, Florida, to write and produce new songs, with Rodney "Darkchild" Jerkins providing additional material late into the production of the album. Alluding to her working relationship with Crawford, it was eventually titled Between Friends, and first released in May 2006 in South Africa, followed by a worldwide distribution in the fourth quarter of 2006. A moderate commercial success, it peaked at number 66 on the Billboard 200, while peaking at number 2 on Billboard's Independent Albums. Its first two singles, "Can't Get Enough" and "Me", both reached the top 30 on the Hot R&B/Hip-Hop Songs chart.

In November 2009, Greatest Hits, a compilation album, was released in South Africa. The same year, Tamia announced that she was working with Crawford to form a supergroup called TDK along with singers Kelly Price and Deborah Cox. Their joint album The Queen Project failed to materialize, however, due to timing issues and label politics. In August 2012, Tamia's fifth studio Beautiful Surprise was released on Plus One and EMI Music. She worked with a vast of different producers on the album, including Chuck Harmony, the Runners, and Carvin & Ivan. Beautiful Surprise earned a mixed reception from music critics and debuted at 23 on the Billboard 200 and at number six on the Top R&B/Hip-Hop Albums. The lead single "Beautiful Surprise", co-written by Claude Kelly and Salaam Remi, peaked at number 24 on the Hot R&B/Hip-Hop Songs. Both the single and its parent album received nominations in the Best R&B Song and Best R&B Album categories at the 55th Annual Grammy Awards, while garnering Tamia a Soul Train Music Award nomination at the 2012 Soul Train Music Awards. In support of Beautiful Surprise, Tamia joined R. Kelly during his the Single Ladies Tour from October until December 2012.

=== 2014–2019: Love Life and Passion Like Fire ===
In August 2014, Tamia signed with Def Jam Recordings, marking her return to major label ranks. Her sixth album, Love Life, was completed in ten days and released on June 9, 2015, in the United States in collaboration with her own label, Plus One Music Group. A departure from her previous independent projects, she worked with a wider range of high-profile producers on its songs, including Polow da Don as well as Oak Felder and Pop Wansel from duo Pop & Oak as well as frequent collaborators Christopher "Tricky" Stewart and The-Dream. Love Life earned generally favorable reviews from critics, who summed it as "grown-up, worn-in R&B at its finest", and debuted at number 24 on the US Billboard 200, selling 16,000 copies in the week ending June 14, 2015. It also debuted on top of Billboard's Top R&B Albums and at number two on the Top R&B/Hip-Hop Albums, becoming Tamia's highest-charting album ever on both charts, and produced three singles, including lead single "Sandwich and a Soda" and follow-up “Stuck with Me” both of which reached the top twenty on Billboard's Adult R&B Songs.

Tamia's seventh album, Passion Like Fire, was released in September 2018 through Plus One, 21 Entertainment, and eOne Music. A breakaway from her previous album, she worked with a smaller team of collaborators on the album, involving longtime contributors Lil' Ronnie, Shep Crawford, and Salaam Remi. While critical reception was generally lukewarm, the album debuted at number 145 on the US Billboard 200, becoming her lowest-charting album yet, also reaching number 17 on Top R&B Albums chart. Its release was preceded by the singles "Leave It Smokin'" and "Today I Do", the former of which became her biggest hit in years, peaking at number two on Billboard's Adult R&B Songs. In support of the album, Tamia embarked on the Passion Like Fire Tour which launched on September 18, 2018, and visited most of the major US cities. In 2019, she was awarded the Soul Music Icon Award at the fourth annual Black Music Honors.

=== 2020–present: Recognition and return to recording ===
In May 2023, Tamia was awarded an honorary Doctor of Music degree from Morris Brown College in Atlanta, Georgia. The following year, she appeared on Louis York's single "Three Little Words" from their second album Songs with Friends (2024), and co-headlined a North American tour with Joe, which ran from February to May and comprised 27 dates across the United States. In August 2026, Tamia returned to South Africa for a three-city tour, performing in Cape Town, Durban, and Pretoria as part of Women's Month celebrations. The same month, she released "Forever and a Day," her first solo single in eight years, again on her own label Plus One Music Group.

== Personal life ==
Singer Anita Baker introduced Tamia to American basketball player Grant Hill through a blind date in Detroit, Michigan, in 1996. After a courtship of about three years, the pair wed on July 24, 1999, in a private reception in Battle Creek. The ceremony was officiated by Hill's cousin, Rev. John H. Grant, and attended by 250 guests. The couple initially resided in Detroit, but later relocated to Orlando when Hill left the Detroit Pistons to sign with the Orlando Magic team. They have two daughters, Myla Grace (born January 23, 2002), and Lael Rose Hill (born August 9, 2007).

In 2003, amid the recording of her third album More, doctors at Duke University Hospital in Durham, North Carolina, diagnosed Tamia with multiple sclerosis, a demyelinating disease in which the insulating covers of nerve cells in the brain and spinal cord are damaged, after she had been experiencing mystifying bouts of fatigue and numbness in her hands, feet, and legs. While the music project was indefinitely bumped from its original August 2003 schedule, she went into subsequent treatment, using corticosteroids to help delay the onset of more severe symptoms. Diagnosed early, the illness has since been in remission though she has occasional but controllable symptoms.

== Discography ==
- Tamia (1998)
- A Nu Day (2000)
- More (2004)
- Between Friends (2006)
- Beautiful Surprise (2012)
- Love Life (2015)
- Passion Like Fire (2018)

== Tours ==
Headlining

- 1998 Tour (1998)
- A Nu Day Tour (2001)
- 2005 Tour (2005)
- Between Friends Tour (2007)
- Beautiful Surprise Tour (2013–2014)
- Love Life Tour (2015)
- Passion Like Fire Tour (2018–2019)

Co-headlining

- Tamia and Joe Tour (2024) (with Joe Thomas)
- The Queen Project (2009) (with Kelly Price and Deborah Cox)
- Soul Summer Concert Series (2008–2009) (with Jaheim and India Arie)

Opening act

- Verizon Ladies First Tour (2004) (opened for Beyoncé, Alicia Keys, and Missy Elliott)
- Single Ladies Tour (2012) (with R. Kelly)

== Awards and nominations ==
Grammy Awards

Year	Nominee / work	Award	Result
1997	"Missing You" (with Brandy, Chaka Khan and Gladys Knight)	Best Pop Collaboration with Vocals	Nominated
1997	"You Put a Move on My Heart" (with Quincy Jones)	Best Female R&B Vocal Performance	Nominated
1997	"Slow Jams" (with Quincy Jones, Babyface, Barry White and Portrait)	Best R&B Performance by a Duo or Group with Vocals	Nominated
2000	"Spend My Life with You" (with Eric Benét)	Best R&B Performance by a Duo or Group with Vocals	Nominated
2013	"Beautiful Surprise"	Best R&B Song	Nominated
2013	Beautiful Surprise	Best R&B Album	Nominated

NAACP Image Award

Year	Nominee / work	Award	Result
2000	"Spend My Life with You" (with Eric Benét)	Outstanding Song	Won

Juno Award

Year	Nominee / work	Award	Result
1999	—N/a	Breakthrough Artist of the Year	Nominated
1999	Tamia	R&B/Soul Recording of the Year	Nominated
2001	A Nu Day	R&B/Soul Recording of the Year	Nominated
2004	Officially Missing You	R&B/Soul Recording of the Year	Nominated
2005	More	R&B/Soul Recording of the Year	Nominated

Soul Train Music Awards

Year	Nominee / work	Award	Result
2012	—N/a	Best Independent/Soul Artist	Nominated

UB Honors Awards

Year	Nominee / work	Award	Result
2012	Beautiful Surprise	Best Independent Urban Album	Nominated
2012	Beautiful Surprise	Best R&B Album Of The Year	Nominated

RLM World Music Awards

Year	Nominee / work	Award	Result
2013	—N/a	Best Female Artist	Nominated

Billboard R&B/Hip-Hop Awards

Year	Nominee / work	Award	Result
2007	—N/a	Top R&B/Hip-Hop Artist - Female	Nominated

Source Awards

Year	Nominee / work	Award	Result
2003	"Into You" (with Fabolous)	R&B/Rap Collaboration Of The Year	Nominated

== See also ==
- List of Billboard number-one dance club songs
- List of artists who reached number one on the U.S. Dance Club Songs chart
- List of people with multiple sclerosis
