= To Whom This May Concern =

Studio album by Jill Scott
- Released: February 13, 2026
- Genres: R&B; neo soul
- Length: 58:11
- Labels: Blues Babe; Human Re Sources; The Orchard
- Producers: Ant Bell; Adam Blackstone; Marc Bridges; Camper; D.K. The Punisher; Riley Geare; DJ Premier; Andre Harris; DW; Om'Mas Keith; Christon Mason; Khari Mateen; Mr Groove; S1; Jill Scott; Seige Monstracity; Trombone Shorty; VT; Eric Wortham; Young RJ; Louis York

Jill Scott chronology
Woman (2015)	To Whom This May Concern (2026)

Singles from To Whom This May Concern
- 1. "Beautiful People" Released: January 2, 2026; 2. "Pressha" Released: January 9, 2026

To Whom This May Concern is the sixth studio album by the American singer Jill Scott. It was released on February 13, 2026, by Blues Babe, Human Re Sources, and The Orchard. The album is Jill Scott's first full-length project in eleven years, stemming from a hiatus that Scott described as a time of prioritizing her personal growth, navigating life transitions, and "wait[ing] to be inspired."

Similar to Scott's previous projects, To Whom This May Concern expands on Scott's neo soul and spoken word roots, yet incorporates elements of New Orleans jazz and blues, hip-hop, funk, alternative R&B, and disco. It blends live instrumentation, such as horns and strings with contemporary production. The album explores self-worth, spirituality, and affirmations in the wake of Scott's own personal setbacks, as well as themes of love, philosophy, Black history, and community.

The album features collaborations from Ab-Soul, JID, Tierra Whack, and Too Short, along with production from longtime collaborator Andre Harris, Adam Blackstone, Camper, DJ Premier, and Trombone Shorty.

Upon release, the album received universal acclaim from critics for its vocals, themes, and experimental approach while maintaining Scott's signature style. The album debuted at number 33 on the Billboard 200, including number 6 on the Independent Albums and number 10 on the Top R&B/Hip Hop Albums charts with 22,000 album-equivalent units sold in its first week. The album spawned two singles, "Beautiful People" and "Pressha", the latter which Scott performed live on Late Night with Jimmy Fallon. Scott embarked on the To Whom This May Concern World Tour in June 2026.

== Background ==
Throughout the 2020s, Jill Scott made appearances on various artists' tracks, notably Alicia Keys, Camper, Kehlani, Sir, Teyana Taylor, Ty Dolla Sign and Tyla. She also embarked on multiple tours throughout the early 2020s to celebrate the 20th anniversary of her debut studio album Who Is Jill Scott?: Words and Sounds Vol. 1 (2000). On June 1, 2024, Scott headlined the Roots Picnic music festival and performed an unreleased song with rapper Tierra Whack, which she also previewed prior to announcing her album in 2025.

On December 22, 2025, Jill Scott posted a promotional video on her Instagram account hinting at new music for the following year. In the video, she explained her process and her hiatus from music since her last studio album Woman (2015). "My process kind of works like this: I wait to be inspired," Scott said in the video. "And that takes time and patience [un]til the words are dripping out of my mouth." Along with the video, Scott previewed the first single for the project, "Beautiful People."

== Release and promotion ==
On January 2, 2026, Jill Scott announced the album's title and artwork on social media and released the first single "Beautiful People" on all streaming services. The album was made available for pre-order the same day, featuring vinyl, CDs and exclusive bundles with merchandise. The album's second single "Pressha" was released the following week on January 9, 2026.

The album cover artwork is by the Chicago artist Marcellous "Infinito 2017" Lovelace, who said "It was her coming to me, not a company or people asking me to do something. It was literally a genuine connection..."

== Commercial performance ==
To Whom This May Concern debuted at number 33 on the US Billboard 200, including number 6 on the Independent Albums and number 10 on the Top R&B/Hip Hop Albums charts with 22,000 album-equivalent units sold in its first week.

== Critical reception ==
Professional ratings
Aggregate scores
Source	Rating
Metacritic	82/100
Review scores
Source	Rating
AllMusic	4/5 stars
The Arts Desk	4/5 stars
Beats Per Minute	77/100
Clash	8/10
musicOMH	3.5/5 stars
Pitchfork	8/10
PopMatters	8/10
The Quietus	(favorable)
Rolling Stone	3.5/5 stars
Variety	(favorable)

To Whom This May Concern was met with critical acclaim. At Metacritic, which assigns a normalized rating out of 100 to reviews from mainstream critics, the album received an average score of 82, based on 13 reviews, indicating "universal acclaim".

Andy Kellman of AllMusic praised the album's musical variety and Scott's lyrical themes, writing, "She's full of fire, uncommonly dexterous both vocally and in emotion -- scathing, instructing, loving, and funny as all get out. All 360 degrees of the Jill Scott experience are presented here." The Arts Desk journalist Guy Oddy described the album's sound as "brimming with improvisational spirit", writing, "[To Whom This May Concern] is an absolute gem that is equal parts magic, joyfulness and a reflection of the times in which we find ourselves." Mary Chiney of Beats Per Minute wrote, "To Whom This May Concern does not attempt to redefine Jill Scott's artistic identity. It deepens it. The record listens more than it announces, observes more than it persuades. In a musical theme that rewards velocity, Scott offers duration, attention sustained long enough for meaning to settle." Joshua Khan of Clash wrote, "The oscillation between moods is deafening, but effortless as Scott's come-ons and teardowns are a poetic masterclass." In the opinion of Pitchfork's Marcus J. Moore, the album "might feel scattered to those wanting her more characteristic, sensuous R&B," while it simultaneously "does a good job of flaring in different directions while keeping close to Scott's artistic core." Jeremy McDonagh of PopMatters regarded To Whom This May Concern as "an album for connoisseurs of strong, impactful vocals." Arusa Qureshi of The Quietus wrote, "She may be six albums in, but having taken the time to pause and recalibrate, Scott is proving that she still has much to say and a voice that is worth listening to." Mosi Reeves of Rolling Stone described the album as a "freshly made portrait of a warmly familiar, complex, all-too-human artist". Steven J. Horowitz of Variety noted that the album was Scott's most experimental album to date, describing it as "a project that paints with wildly broad strokes and continuously returns on its investment."

== Track listing ==
To Whom This May Concern track listing
No.	Title	Writer(s)	Producer(s)	Length
1.	"Dope Shit" (featuring Maha Adachi Earth)	Anthony Bell; Andre Harris; Hope Ostane-Baucom	Bell; Harris	0:55
2.	"Be Great" (featuring Trombone Shorty)	Jill Scott; Troy Andrews; Adam Blackstone; Donovan Knight	Blackstone; D.K. The Punisher; Trombone Shorty; Scott^{[a]}	3:12
3.	"Beautiful People"	Scott; Om'Mas Keith	Keith	3:47
4.	"Offdaback"	Scott; Riley Geare; Vincent Tolan	Geare; VT	3:28
5.	"Norf Side" (featuring Tierra Whack)	Scott; Chris Martin; Robert Martin; Tierra Whack	DJ Premier	2:51
6.	"Disclaimer"	Scott	Scott	0:31
7.	"Pay U on Tuesday"	Scott; Blackstone; Charles Harmon; Claude Kelly	Blackstone; Louis York; Scott^{[a]}	3:04
8.	"Pressha"	Scott; Blackstone; Tolan	Blackstone; VT	4:16
9.	"BPOTY" (featuring Too Short)	Scott; Khari Mateen; Todd Shaw	Mateen	3:04
10.	"Me 4"	Scott; Chad Hugo; Gene Thornton Jr.; Terrence Thornton; Marcus White; Bryan Williams; Pharrell Williams	Seige Monstracity	1:34
11.	"The Math"	Scott; Darhyl Camper, Jr.; Terrell Roper; Tanerélle Stephens	Camper	3:28
12.	"A Universe"	Scott; Geare; Tolan	Geare; VT	3:17
13.	"Liftin' Me Up"	Scott; Eric Wortham; Dwayne Wright	Wortham; DW	4:25
14.	"Ode to Nikki" (featuring Ab-Soul)	Scott; Tommy James; Robert King; Craig Lane; Christon Mason; Ralph Rice; The Shondells; Herbert Stevens IV	Mr Groove; Mason; Young RJ	2:51
15.	"Don't Play"	Scott; White	Seige Monstracity	2:42
16.	"To B Honest" (with JID)	Scott; Carol Connors; Patrick Mix, Jr.; Destin Route; David Shire; White	Seige Monstracity	4:30
17.	"Right Here Right Now"	Scott; Lamar Andrews; Carvin Haggins; Keith; Yountie Strickland; Malek Yisrael	Keith; Scott^{[a]}; L. Andrews^{[a]}; Haggins^{[a]}; Strickland^{[a]}; Yisrael^{[a]}	4:24
18.	"Àṣẹ"	Scott; Harris	Harris	3:11
19.	"Sincerely Do"	Scott; Marc Bridges; Larry Griffin Jr.	Bridges; S1	2:41
Total length:				58:11

=== Notes ===
- ^{^[a]} indicates an additional producer.
- "Me 4" samples "What Happened to That Boy", written by Bryan Williams, Chad Hugo, Pharrell Williams, Terrence Thornton, and Gene Thornton, as performed by Baby featuring Clipse.

== Personnel ==
Credits adapted from Tidal.

=== Musicians ===
- Jill Scott – instruments (track 1), lead vocals (2–19), background vocals (3, 4, 9–11, 14)
- Maha Adachi Earth – spoken word (1)
- Om'Mas Keith – arrangement (2, 3, 17), drum machine (3), drums (17)
- The Shindellas – background vocals (2, 3)
- Adam Blackstone – wind instrument (2); arrangement, strings (7); music direction, keyboards (8)
- Trombone Shorty – horn (2, 13)
- Lizzy Komba – background vocals (2, 15)
- Jamar Jones – music arrangement, strings (2)
- Dan Oestreicher – baritone saxophone (2)
- Terance Vaughn – drums (2)
- BK Jackson – tenor saxophone (2)
- Dontae Winslow – tuba (2)
- Matthew Banner – tuba (2)
- Claude Kelly – background vocals (3)
- Vincent "VT" Tolan – bass guitar (4, 8, 12), arrangement (12)
- Riley Geare – drums (4, 12)
- Tierra Whack – lead vocals (5)
- Melvin Jones – trombone (7), trumpet (13)
- Erskine Hawkins – arrangement, piano (7)
- Brian Frasier Moore – drums (7)
- Randy Bowland – guitar (7)
- Aaron Draper – drums (7)
- Chuck Harmony – piano (7)
- Tim Green – saxophone (7)
- Kev Choice – arrangement (8)
- Tyries Rolf – strings (8)
- Ayo Brame – tenor saxophone (8)
- Richard Benitez III – trumpet (8)
- Khari Mateen – arrangement, bass guitar (9)
- Too Short – lead vocals (9)
- Paul "DW" Wright – bass guitar (13, 16)
- Eric Wortham – keyboards (13, 16)
- Hairston Bradley – drums (13)
- Monsieur Dominique Thomas – percussion (13)
- Michael Burton – saxophone (13)
- Wilbert Williams – trombone (13)
- Ab-Soul – lead vocals (14)
- Mr Groove – piano (14)
- Jett Roberts – background vocals (15)
- JID – lead vocals (16)
- Andre Harris – arrangement, bass guitar (18)
- Myles Sweeney – piano (19)

=== Technical ===
- Jeremy Hunter – engineering (2, 4–16, 18, 19)
- Eduardo Ghigo – engineering (2, 4–16, 18)
- Dillon Brady – engineering (2)
- Om'Mas Keith – engineering (3, 17)
- Vincent "VT" Tolan – mixing
- Zach "Ekzakt" Perry – mixing
- Ariadni Kidonis – additional mixing
- Dave Kutch – mastering
- Marcellous "Infinito 2017" Lovelace – art work

== Charts ==
Chart performance for To Whom This May Concern
Chart (2026)	Peak position
Japanese Dance & Soul Albums (Oricon)	8
Japanese Download Albums (Billboard Japan)	89
Japanese Western Albums (Oricon)	30
Scottish Albums (Official Charts)	38
UK Albums Sales (OCC)	12
UK Independent Albums (Official Charts)	4
UK R&B Albums (Official Charts)	1
US Billboard 200	33
US Independent Albums (Billboard)	6
US Top R&B/Hip-Hop Albums (Billboard)	10

== Release history ==
To Whom This May Concern release history
Region	Date	Format	Label	Ref.
Various	February 13, 2026	CD; digital download; streaming	Blues Babe; Human Re Sources; The Orchard	
