= R.E.D. (Ne-Yo album) =

Studio album by Ne-Yo
- Released: October 31, 2012
- Recorded: 2011–12
- Genres: Pop; dance-pop; R&B
- Length: 51:10
- Labels: Compound; Motown
- Producers: Andrew Goldstein; Chuck Harmony; Calvin Harris; No I.D.; Emanuel Kiriakou; Luke Laird; Phatboiz; Bingo Players; Reeva & Black; Salaam Remi; Harmony Samuels; Shea Taylor; Reginald Smith; Stargate; Jesse "Corporal" Wilson

Ne-Yo chronology
Libra Scale (2010)	R.E.D. (2012)	Non-Fiction (2015)

Singles from R.E.D.
- 1. "Lazy Love" Released: June 12, 2012; 2. "Let Me Love You (Until You Learn to Love Yourself)" Released: July 10, 2012; 3. "Don't Make Em Like You" Released: October 22, 2012; 4. "Forever Now" Released: November 23, 2012

R.E.D. (an acronym for Realizing Every Dream), is the fifth studio album by American singer-songwriter Ne-Yo, first released on October 31, 2012, in Japan. The album follows the disappointing commercial performance to 2010's Libra Scale and is Ne-Yo's first album with new label Motown Records after being appointed as the label's senior vice president for A&R. The album contains songs that crossover different genres of music, combining elements of R&B, pop and dance-pop.

On R.E.D., Ne-Yo has re-united with frequent partners StarGate as well as new collaborators such as Harmony Samuels, No I.D. and The Underdogs. Early previews of the album indicate a progression in the singer's sound with a deeper lyrical content. Preceding the album's release were two singles: the R&B-tinged "Lazy Love," which reached the upper half of the US Hot R&B/Hip-Hop Songs chart, and the Sia-penned synth/Europop song "Let Me Love You (Until You Learn to Love Yourself)". Upon release, R.E.D. received generally favorable reviews from most music critics.

== Background and conception ==
R.E.D. is Ne-Yo's fifth album and follow up to 2010's Libra Scale, which was viewed by some as disappointing. The album title, an acronym for the phrase 'Realizing Every Dream" was inspired by the singer's personal experiences. In the album's press release he explained "[it] came from me stepping outside myself, looking at my life as it is today and realizing that every dream I've had from the day I decided I wanted to do music, every dream that I've had from then til now, I'm definitely on the way to realizing it." During various press interviews back in 2011, Ne-Yo had previously titled the album The Cracks in Mr Perfect. It is reported that during an interview with TMZ, the singer clarified speculation as to why the album title changed and comparison to an album released by rapper the Game called, The R.E.D. Album (2011). Ne-Yo said "No... I don't feel like I ripped off The Game's album... as I was doing the album, [the original title] The Cracks in Mr Perfect just didn't make sense any more, it didn't fit any more... however, R.E.D – Realising Every Dream – did." R.E.D is Ne-Yo's first album since moving from Island Def Jam to Motown Records, where he also serves as senior vice president for the label's A&R division. Ironically, the album's title and artwork did draw comparison's to Taylor Swift's Red which release earlier the same month.

Ne-Yo reunited with long-term collaborators such as Norwegian songwriting/production duo StarGate, as well as UK producer Harmony, No I.D. and David Banner. Speaking of his studio sessions on the album, Ne-Yo told his producers that he wanted the album – which he described to Blues & Soul as "lyrically honest to a fault" – to be meaningful. "One thing that I told everybody going into this is, 'I don't want you making a track like you're making a track for Ne-Yo. Just do what you do and let the fact that I'm on it be the Ne-Yo element. There is no way to expand and grow if everybody you're working with wants to keep you in a box." Some critics responded to the comments made by Ne-Yo and came to the conclusion that the singer had "lost touch" with his R&B roots. During a visit to Angie Martinez' Hot 97 radio show, Ne-Yo addressed his critics saying "I know where I came from. I know that R&B is where it started at for me... When this new album comes out, it will shut the mouths of everybody who feels like I have 'crossed over'." The album was pushed back from its original release date of September 18, 2012 to October 31, 2012.

== Music and composition ==
"This album is an equal mix of both. If there’s six R&B records, then there’s six pop records so that everybody can come to the same damn concert and stay for the whole damn show."

— Ne-Yo describing the album's composition to Angie Martinez on the
Hot 97 Show.

The album was previously titled The Cracks in Mr Perfect, which was based on a song of the same name which would still appear on the album. The song also contains a verse about having "unprotected sex", with Tracey Garraud from Rolling Stone magazine noting a "deeper" and "maturer" subject content for the singer. The song is strongly influenced by country music and was co-written with country music star Carrie Underwood's frequent collaborator Luke Laird. In a press release from Universal Motown, the record label hope to record a remix with country singer Tim McGraw for a future radio release and that one day Ne-Yo could perform the song at the Country Music Awards. Ne-Yo told Hip-Hop Wired that he was also hoping to record a song with rapper Young Jeezy.

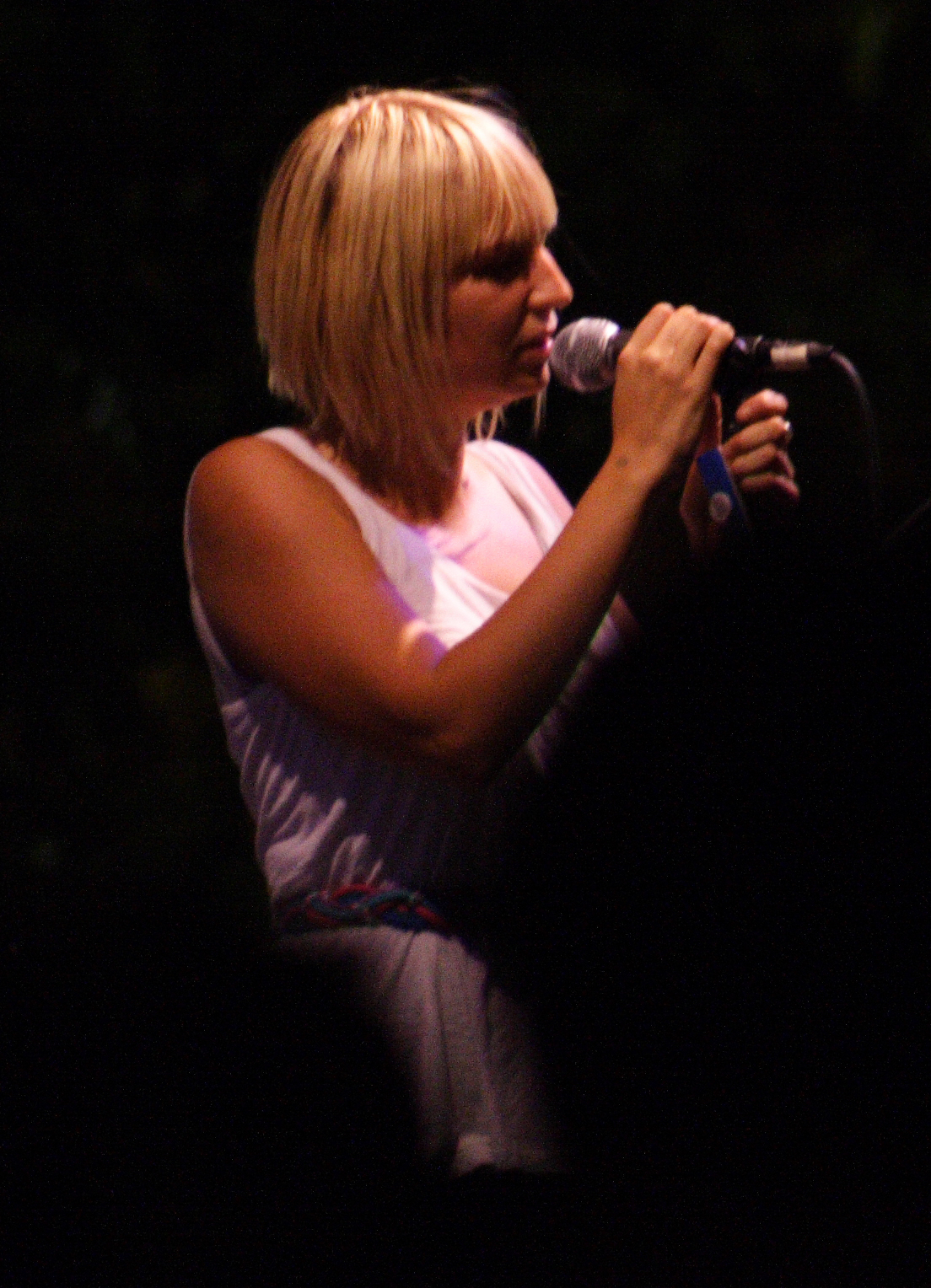
Sia was instrumental in writing the chorus for "Let Me Love You".

"Let Me Love You (Until You Learn to Love Yourself)" was co-written with pop-indie singer-songwriter Sia and is an up-tempo club song which combines elements of Europop and synthpop. Speaking about the song Ne-Yo said he was inspired by the powerful chorus, and in a press release he elaborated on the song's lyrical content: "It goes beyond the realm of just a relationship between man and woman, "this is understanding what it is to allow another person to get close enough to you to teach you how to love yourself. This song, if taken care of the right way, could help the world!" Another song titled "Unconditional" and produced by Phatboiz picks up on the same themes of romance. On this song, Ne-Yo sings with ambient vocals. Phatboiz produced a second song for the album, "Jealous" which was described as a "tight R&B groove" with imaginative vocals. Released as the album's lead single, "Lazy Love" features a "sonorous base" line and "slow-drip synths" with lyrics that centre on the "languid desire that pins a couple to their sheets way past morning".

The Salaam Remi-produced "Alone with You" is dedicated to Ne-Yo's daughter Madilyn Grace, after an incident where Madilyn refused to stop crying after being brought home from the hospital until she went quiet upon hearing "Alone with You". Meanwhile, the 90's influenced "Should Be You" borrows guest vocals from former label-mate, rapper Fabolous. The song draws inspiration from Mary J. Blige's 1995 single "I Love You" and features the duo singing about regrets with the aid of "one-liners". Ne-Yo described the song's lyrical content as "about being with somebody and wishing you were with someone else". Newcomer ReVaughn Brown also recorded guest vocals for the album on a song called "All She Wants". Built around a hip-hop beat and 808s features Ne-Yo's vocals layered with "airy background vocals" from Brown, and a featured rap from Young Jeezy. It features exclusively on the Target Deluxe edition of the album. "Slow Down" continues those sentiments with Ne-Yo singing in his falsetto. Continuing the more adult content, the song "Stress Reliever" centers around the singer's favorite sex position. The song draws inspiration from fellow R&B singer R. Kelly and rapper Lil Wayne.

== Singles ==
"Lazy Love" premiered online on May 14, 2012, and was serviced to US urban radio on May 29, 2012. On June 12, 2012, the song was released for digital download in the United States. The clean version of the official music video was premiered on BET's 106 & Park on June 11, 2012, while the dirty version premiered the following day on VEVO. The song peaked at number 29 on Billboard's US Hot R&B/Hip-Hop Songs chart. The album's second single is titled "Let Me Love You (Until You Learn to Love Yourself)" and was unveiled to various media outlets on July 9, 2012. The synthpop and Europop song was co-written with Australian indie/pop singer-songwriter Sia. A day later it was released for digital download in Australia, mainland Europe and the UK. "Let Me Love You" was serviced to US rhythmic/crossover radio stations on July 31, 2012, and a week later on August 7, 2012, to pop/mainstream stations. It was released in the US on July 31, 2012.

During an interview with DJ Whoo Kid on Shade 45 radio, Ne-Yo said that the album's third single would probably be a song called "Should Be You" featuring rappers Fabolous and Diddy. However, on October 4, 2012, Ne-Yo confirmed that "Don't Make Em Like You" featuring rapper Wiz Khalifa had been selected as the album's third single instead. It was released for digital download on October 22, 2012, in the United States. "Forever Now" will serve as the second international single and fourth overall single from the album. It will be released on November 23, 2012, in Germany and December 2, 2012, in the United Kingdom.

== Reception ==
=== Critical reception ===
R.E.D. has received favorable reviews from most music critics. At Metacritic, which assigns a normalized rating out of 100 to reviews from mainstream critics, the album received an average score of 68, which indicates "generally favorable" reviews, based on eight critic reviews. Ken Capobianco of Boston Globe lauded the album's production, writing that Ne-Yo successfully augments dance-oriented pop with love songs. Capobianco went on to further praise R.E.D. for being "smart, sophisticated, and built around songs." Ray Rahman of Entertainment Weekly praised Ne-Yo's advancing maturity, the album's lyrics and the track "She Is", which he described as a "country-tinged", "smooth and casual" record." Nate Chinen of The New York Times also praised the latter track, noting several other songs as stand-outs, including "Carry On (Her Letter to Him)", "Shut Me Down", "Cracks in Mr. Perfect", "Let Me Love You (Until You Learn to Love Yourself)" and "Don't Make 'Em Like You", despite being ambivalent towards Wiz Khalifa's appearance. Chinen also depicted Ne-Yo's "fondness for harmonic twists" which "reframe his melodies as he’s singing them", and his stylistic departure from his previous albums. The Washington Post's Sarah Godfrey recognized Ne-Yo as an "extremely gifted and versatile songwriter", noting R.E.D. to contain some "great music", but showing a "clumsy attempt to cram all of Ne-Yo's gifts into one package", making the album "disjointed" as a whole.

Will Hermes of Rolling Stone gave the album two-and-a-half stars out of five, commenting that R.E.D. contains a broad mix of songs, with varied genres. Though Hermes saw artists such as Frank Ocean and Miguel "boldly" re-imagining commercial R&B, which makes R.E.D. appear "less like vision than parsing market research." Andy Kellman of Allmusic showed ambivalence towards the album's pop material. He went on comment on its highlights as "all casual, subtle, finely detailed mid-tempo numbers and slow jams," but was disappointed in the lack of "energetic songs" that descended from soul and funk, noting "It Just Ain't Right," "Because of You", "Nobody" and "Champagne Life" as examples of Ne-Yo's past work honing such genres." The Guardian's Caroline Sullivan also showed a mixed response towards the album's pop songs, writing that R.E.D. "won't reassure those who accuse him of drifting away from R&B to make a quick pop buck". Mikael Wood of the Los Angeles Times wrote that R.E.D. is the singer's effort to "get back to the basics", which are shown in the opening two tracks, "Cracks in Mr. Perfect" and "Lazy Love", which "share an up-close intimacy" with songs by Beyoncé and Frank Ocean. Wood depicted "Let Me Love You (Until You Learn to Love Yourself)" to "remind us of simpler times" by re-using a portion of its title from Mario's "Let Me Love You", which Ne-Yo himself wrote. Wood goes on to note the follow-up tracks to be of lesser quality, giving the album two-and-a-half stars out of four.

=== Commercial performance ===
On the week ending of November 17, 2012, R.E.D. debuted at number seventeen on the UK Albums Chart. Marking this his third consecutive top-twenty album on the chart after In My Own Words (2006) which charted at number fourteen and Libra Scale (2010) which also charted at number eleven. It also debuted at number two on the UK R&B Albums Chart. The album debuted at number ten on the UK Digital Chart. On the week ending November 17, 2012 R.E.D. entered the US Billboard 200 chart at number four, selling 66,000 copies in its first week. This marks his third consecutive top-ten album in the United States, and charted five places higher and sold 46,000 copies less than his last album, Libra Scale which debuted at number nine on the chart, and sold 112,000 copies in its first week. The album opened at the top spot of the R&B/Hip-Hop Albums chart, his third album to do so. As of January 2015, the album has sold 264,000 copies in the US.

In 2013, R.E.D. was ranked as the 165th most popular album of the year on the Billboard 200.

== Track listing ==
R.E.D. track listing
No.	Title	Writer(s)	Producer(s)	Length
1.	"Cracks in Mr. Perfect"	Shaffer Smith; Robert Shea Taylor	Shea Taylor	4:56
2.	"Lazy Love"	Smith; Taylor	Taylor	3:16
3.	"Let Me Love You (Until You Learn to Love Yourself)"	Smith; Sia Furler; Mikkel S. Eriksen; Tor E. Hermansen; Mark Hadfield; Mike Di Scala	Stargate; Reeva & Black	4:11
4.	"Miss Right"	Smith; Eriksen; Hermansen	Stargate	3:49
5.	"Jealous"	Smith; Allen Arthur; Clayton Reilly; Keith Justice	Phatboiz	4:07
6.	"Don't Make Em Like You" (featuring Wiz Khalifa)	Smith; Harmony Samuels; Cameron Thomaz	Samuels	4:09
7.	"Be the One"	Smith; Eriksen; Hermansen	Stargate	3:47
8.	"Stress Reliever"	Smith; Taylor	Taylor	3:35
9.	"She Is" (featuring Tim McGraw)	Smith; Luke Laird	Laird; Byron Gallimore^{[a]}	3:26
10.	"Carry On (Her Letter to Him)"	Smith; Jesse "Corporal" Wilson	Wilson; Reginald Smith	3:56
11.	"Forever Now"	Smith; Arthur; Reilly; Justice; Eriksen; Hermansen; Paul Bäumer; Maarten Hoogstraten	Stargate; Bingo Players; Phatboiz^{[b]}	3:41
12.	"Shut Me Down"	Smith; Emanuel Kiriakou; Andrew Goldstein	Kiriakou; Goldstein	3:41
13.	"Unconditional"	Smith; Arthur; Reilly; Justice	Phatboiz	4:38
Total length:				51:10

Deluxe edition
No.	Title	Writer(s)	Producer(s)	Length
14.	"Should Be You" (featuring Fabolous and Diddy)	Smith; Remi; Jackson; Coleman	Remi	4:15
15.	"My Other Gun"	Smith; E. Wilson; Wyreman; Randolph; Landsberg; Pappalardi; Ventura; Weinstein; Redd; Redd Jr.; Handy; Horne; Rob. Bell; Ron. Bell; Mickens; Thomas; Westfield	No I.D.	3:18
16.	"Alone with You (Maddies Song)"	Smith; Remi	Remi	4:58
17.	"Let's Go" (featuring Calvin Harris)	Harris; Smith	Harris	3:53

Notes

- ^{^[a]} signifies Tim McGraw vocal producer.
- ^{^[b]} signifies a co-producer.
- "My Other Gun" contains elements of "Long Red", as performed by Mountain and elements of "N.T. (parts 1 & 2)" performed by Kool and the Gang.

== Personnel ==
Credits adapted from album's liner notes.

- Stephen Allbritten — vocal engineer (track 9)
- Mike Anderson — engineer (tracks 3, 7)
- Paul Bäumer — producer and instrumentation (track 11)
- Jose Cardoza — assistant engineer (track 6)
- Kevin "KD" Davis — mixing (tracks 1, 2, 4–6, 8–10, 12–16)
- Mike Di Scala — producer and instrumentation (track 3)
- Gleyder "Gee" Disla — engineer (tracks 14, 16)
- Mikkel S. Eriksen – producer, engineer, and instrumentation (tracks 3, 4, 7, 11)
- Moses "Mellomo" Gallart — engineer (tracks 1, 2, 5, 6, 8, 9, 12–15, 17)
- Byron Gallimore — vocal producer (track 9)
- Andrew Goldstein — producer, keyboards, guitars, and programming (track 12)
- Ryan Gore — engineer (track 9)
- Mark Hadfield — producer and instrumentation (track 3)
- Jaymz Hardy-Martin III — engineer (track 9)
- Calvin Harris — producer, arrangements, and instrumentation (track 17)
- Vincent Henry — guitars (track 16)
- Tor Erik Hermansen – producer and instrumentation (tracks 3, 4, 7, 11)
- Maarten Hoogstraten — producer and instrumentation (track 11)
- Carlos King — engineer (track 6)
- Emanuel Kiriakou — producer, keyboards, guitars, and programming (track 12)
- Wiz Khalifa — rap (track 6)
- Jens Koerkemeier — engineer and editing (track 12)
- Luke Laird — producer, guitars, and drum programming (track 9)
- Jerel Lake — assistant mix engineer (track 4)
- Tim McGraw — vocals (track 9)
- Ne-Yo — vocals (all tracks), producer (track 12), executive producer
- No I.D. — producer (track 15)
- Phatboiz — producers (tracks 5, 13), co-producers (track 11)
- Kevin Randolph — keyboards (track 15)
- Salaam Remi — producer, arrangements, bass, keyboards, and drums (tracks 14, 16)
- Ramon Rivas — assistant engineer (tracks 1, 2, 8)
- Daniel Rivera — additional/assistant mixing (tracks 3, 7, 11)
- Jeff Roach — string programming (track 9)
- Harmony "H-Money" Samuels — producer (track 6)
- Reginald Smith — producer (track 10)
- Phil Tan — mixing (tracks 3, 7, 11)
- Shea Taylor — producer, guitar, and instrumentation (tracks 1, 2, 8)
- Patt Thrall — engineer and editing (track 12)
- Miles Walker — engineer (tracks 3, 7, 11)
- Curtis "Sauce" Wilson — engineer (tracks 10, 11)
- Jesse "Corparal" Wilson — producer (track 10)
- Kenneth Wright — bass (track 13)
- Steve Wyreman — guitar and bass (track 15)

== Charts ==
=== Weekly charts ===
Chart (2012)	Peak position
Australian Albums (ARIA)	37
Belgian Albums (Ultratop Flanders)	39
Belgian Albums (Ultratop Wallonia)	76
Canadian Albums (Billboard)	24
Dutch Albums (Album Top 100)	34
French Albums (SNEP)	52
German Albums (Offizielle Top 100)	22
Irish Albums (IRMA)	26
Italian Albums (FIMI)	46
Japanese Albums (Oricon)	6
Scottish Albums (Official Charts)	30
Swiss Albums (Schweizer Hitparade)	40
UK Albums (Official Charts)	17
UK R&B Albums (Official Charts)	2
US Billboard 200	4
US Top R&B/Hip-Hop Albums (Billboard)	1

=== Year-end charts ===
Chart (2012)	Position
US Top R&B/Hip-Hop Albums (Billboard)	74

Chart (2013)	Position
US Billboard 200	165
US Top R&B/Hip-Hop Albums (Billboard)	31

== Certifications ==
Region	Certification	Certified units/sales
United Kingdom (BPI)	Silver	60,000^{*}
^{*} Sales figures based on certification alone.

== Release history ==
List of release dates, showing country, record label, and catalog number
Region	Date	Format	Label	Catalog
Japan	October 31, 2012	Standard edition	Universal Music Japan	UICT9017
Japan	October 31, 2012	Deluxe edition	Universal Music Japan	UICT1066
Germany	November 2, 2012	Standard edition	Universal Music Group	—N/a
Germany	November 2, 2012	Deluxe edition	Universal Music Group	—N/a
United Kingdom	November 5, 2012	Standard edition	Mercury Records	—N/a
United Kingdom	November 5, 2012	Deluxe edition	Mercury Records	—N/a
United States	November 6, 2012	Standard edition	Motown Records	—N/a
United States	November 6, 2012	Deluxe edition	Motown Records	—N/a
