= Galen Hooks =

American choreographer

- Born: November 19, 1985 (age 40); Los Angeles, California, U.S.
- Education: Pennsylvania State University (BA)
- Occupations: Dancer, choreographer
- Known for: The LXD
- Website: Official Website

Galen Hooks (born November 19, 1985) is an American dancer and choreographer.

== Work ==
Hooks has worked with over 60 artists including Janet Jackson, Justin Bieber, Ne-Yo, Britney Spears, Kylie Minogue, Usher, Ciara, Mýa, Chris Brown, the Jonas Brothers, William Chan, Miley Cyrus, Rihanna, Banks, Sunmi, Grimes, and John Legend.

Her career began as a child, competing on Star Search at age 7, and appearing in a Montell Jordan music video when she was 9. She continued acting and dancing while attending school throughout her childhood, appearing on Nickelodeon and in Austin Powers in Goldmember.

Producing credits include America's Got Talent (associate consulting producer), The Voice (associate performance producer), Disney Channel Presents: Radio Disney's Family VIP Birthday (executive producer, creative director), and YouTube's Masterclass (consulting producer and host). Theatre work includes, associate co-choreographer for the revival of the Broadway show Dreamgirls and choreographer for the musical Higher Education.

Hooks is a dancer, choreographer, and actress in The Legion of Extraordinary Dancers. She worked for Miguel ("Arch N Point"), Usher ("Good Kisser"), and served as a dancer, choreographer and actress for Ne-Yo's concept album Libra Scale, in which she played the lead character, Diamond Eye, and an alter ego, Pretti Sinclair, in the album's music videos, album leaflet and live performances.

More recently, Hooks has garnered fame for YouTube videos featuring her original choreography, including "River," "Love on the Brain," "Human," "i love you," and "Best Part."

Hooks has directed two short films, Wait for Me and There Once Was a Woman, which she also produced, choreographed, costumed, edited, and for which she wrote original music.

Additional songwriting includes "Tuesday," "Honey," "Burn," and "Mercy. She also has released songs with her music group Campfire Vaudeville.

Job	Description	Role			
Camila Cabello	"Havana"	Creative Director/Choreographer - VMA-nominated	So You Think You Can Dance	The LXD performance	Dancer/Co-Choreographer
The LXD	"Duet", "Rise of the Drifts", "I Seen a Man" webisode	Actress, dancer, choreographer			
Ne-Yo	"Beautiful Monster" long form video	Actress, dancer, choreographer			
Ne-Yo	"Champagne Life" music video	Actress, dancer, choreographer			
Ne-Yo	"One in a Million" music video	Actress			
Janet Jackson	"So Excited", "Rock With You" music videos	Dancer			
Usher	"Hey Daddy" music video	Choreographer			
United States of Tara	"Princess Valhalla" viral video	Choreographer			
Dreamgirls	Apollo performance and international tour	Associate Co-Choreographer			
The Jonas Brothers	"Look Me In the Eyes" Tour	Choreographer			
Dancing with the Stars	John Legend "Green Light" performance	Choreographer			
Nike	Vogue and other campaigns	Model			
Miguel	"Arch N Point" music video	Lead Dancer, Choreographer			
Britney Spears	"Til the World Ends" music video	Dancer			
Harry's Law	"Send In the Clowns" episode	Choreographer			
Suburgatory	multiple episodes	Choreographer			
Justin Bieber	"Santa Claus is Comin' To Town"	Choreographer			
Keri Hilson feat. Kanye West	"Knocks You Down" Letterman performance	Dancer/Choreographer			
GI Joe: Retaliation	Movie	Choreographer/Dancer			
Usher	"Good Kisser" music video	Dancer			
