= DJ Hen Boogie =

American musician

DJ Hen Boogie born Henry Alexander III is an American DJ and producer whose music encompasses and fuses a wide variety of genres including jazz, hip hop, electronic music, and soul. He is arguably best known for being a pioneer of the Bay Area independent hip hop movement of the early 1990s as the production mind behind the group The Dereliks whose release "A Turn on the Wheel is Worth More than a Record Deal" is a highly sought recording over 15 years after its initial release.

== Hiatus and return to music ==
DJ Hen Boogie all but vanished from the musical scene after the Dereliks release. Very limited information exists as to why the musical departure, but sources speculate it being primarily to focus on his new family, which included a marriage and three children.

In 2003, DJ Hen Boogie quietly returned to the musical scene with the release of "Change for the Bus Ride Home" on Sublevel Epidemic Records, which contained a collection of unreleased Dereliks songs as well as remastered outtakes from their "lost" demo tapes.

== Solo career ==
In 2005, he re focused on branding his own identity away from the Dereliks with the release of "Nobody Beats the Boog" on FemaleFun Records. This release solidified him as a major break record collector and force in hip hop documenting the countless rare records that many artists have previously sampled.

In 2006, DJ Hen Boogie returned to production working alongside Jeni Fujita (of Fugees fame) and with Swedish born Kissey Asplund. He also has been credited for remixes with O.U.O. (formerly Zimbabwe Legit) featuring Asheru from Unspoken Heard, CL Smooth (of Pete Rock & CL Smooth fame), and Sadat X (of Brand Nubian fame). He also has completed his debut album, A Happy Present from the Planet Earth, released May 2007 by the Eastern Developments subsidiary Easel Records.

2008 saw DJ Hen Boogie with additional production credits with spoken word artist Karen Gibson-Roc, a remix album titled "Time Off" with Chicago's Infinito 2017 on Nephew of Frank Records, remixes with Vanessa Daou, and production on Jeni Fujita's debut release "This Little Light of Mine..." on Low Self Discipline records.

2009 returned to his roots as a DJ/tastemaker/cratedigger with the highly subscribed and downloaded podcast appropriately titled "Nobody Beats the Boog." Named after his 2005 FemaleFun records sample break CD, the podcast featured exclusives from artists from around the world. Notable appearances included interviews with singer's Czelena, Suzy Duffy, and an impromptu interview and appearance by beat maker B.O.O.K.S. One. The podcast also featured accolades from various industry friends and cohorts most notably Zelma Davis from C&C Music Factory fame, Japanese vocalist Monday Michiru, Norway vocalist Kinny, Joy Jones, Karen Gibson-Roc and YZ. The show ended June 2010.

In 2011, DJ Hen Boogie was hired as a composer for music licensing and supervision company Thwak Music. He has been tasked to compose music for several major brand commercial advertisements and television shows as a result of this partnership.

In 2012, DJ Hen Boogie developed a web series that was the result of an encounter with rapper Biz Markie called #youaintgotnobeats. In the series DJ Hen Boogie, Da Hermit and Biz Markie's DJ, Cutmaster Cool V were interviewed.

In 2013, DJ Hen Boogie was reportedly sued by Beats Music for copyright infringement based on the word "Beats." DJ Hen Boogie subsequently produced a video documenting the litigation. The site youaintgotnobeats.com has since shut down speculating that a settlement occurred between Apple/Beats music and DJ Hen Boogie although no public mention or documentation currently exists.

== Discography ==
=== Albums ===
- Nobody Beats the Boog - 2005 FemaleFun/Domination Records
- A Happy Present from the Planet Earth - 2007 Easel Japan
- Music Musik Musique Vol. 1 - 2016 TableSpin Records
- Music Musique Musik Vol. 2 - 2016 TableSpin Records
- Scientific Fetal Development Sounds for the Womb (Institute for Cognitive Baby Development) - 2018 Low Self Discipline

=== Production credits ===
- A Turn on the Wheel is Worth More than a Record Deal (with The Dereliks) - 1995 Low Self Discipline
- Demonstration 12 (New Moon) - 2000 Squared Circle Records
- Rule by the People - (L.E.F.T.) 2002 Dialect Sound Records
- This Before That (Piseas) - 2003 Unknown Label
- Change for the Bus Ride Home (with The Dereliks) - 2003 SubLevel Epidemic
- Eye Elevate (Infinito 2017) - 2005 Nephew of Frank Records
- Dirty Work + A Good Day to Die (Bash Bros.) - 2007 Squared Circle Records
- Trapped (Remix)(O.U.O. ) - 2006 King Records
- Still Trapped (O.U.O. feat Aheru) - 2007 Redline Music Distribution
- A Happy Present from the Planet Earth - 2007 Easel - Japan
- God is Back remix (with Sadat X) - 2007 Low Self Discipline
- The Stroll (with CL Smooth) - 2007 ShamanWorks
- Listen Again (with Cadence) - 2007 Sun Rare Records - Japan
- Black Aroma ( Infinito 2017) - 2007 Low Self Discipline
- Time Off (Infinito 2017) - 2008 Nephew of Frank
- Touching the Soul (Karen Gibson-Roc) - 2008 Lemongrassmusic - Germany
- This Little Light of Mine (Jeni Fujita)- 2008 Low Self Discipline
- Painted Room (Dj Hen Boogie So Much Soul Remix) (Karen Gibson-Roc)- 2009 Lemongrassmusic - Germany
- Awareness (Jeni Fujita)- 2009 Jeni Fujita Music
- Lounge du Soleil, Vol. 8 (Various) - 2010 Lemongrassmusic - Germany
- Never Mind the Technical Difficulties (Various) - 2010 Day by Day
- Body Art 2 (25 Erotic Chill-Lounge Tracks) (Various) - 2010 Tiger Grass Records - Germany
- Audio Still Life (Dem One)- 2011 StickyNote Records
- Hotel De Prestige – Lounge Exquisite 3 (Various)- 2011 Invisible Lounge - Germany
- Only a Part of…EP (Infinito 2017) - 2011 Nephew of Frank
- Truth Vol. 1 (Suzy Duffy)- 2011 Low Self Discipline
- Herbest - LP (North Smoke Ing)- 2011 ING RECORDS / PRESIDENTS HEIGHTS / P-VINE RECORDS - Japan
- Tsakemo (Anbuley) - 2011 Seayou Records
- Kemo' Yoo Keke (DJ Hen Boogie Feeli Feeli Remix) (Anbuley) - 2011 Seayou Records
- Erotic Chill Vol. 1" Album (Various) - 2012 ZYX Music - Germany
- Speak/Easy: The Moonshine Mixes ('Joe Sent Me' Revisited) (Vanessa Daou) - 2012 Daou Music/KID Recordings
- Light Sweet Crude (Act 1: Hybrid) (Vanessa Daou) - 2013 Daou Music/KID Recordings
- Supernatural Being (Anbuley) - 2015 Outsider Music/KID Recordings
- Music, Musique, Muzik Vol. 1 (DJ Hen Boogie) - 2015 Low Self Discipline
- Music, Muzik, Musique Vol. 2 (DJ Hen Boogie) - 2015 Low Self Discipline
- The Freedom EP (Anbuley) - 2017 StraightUp! Music
- Becoming a Nun 2.0 (DJ Hen Boogie's Luminous in the Dark Mix) (Vanessa Daou) - 2018 Daou Music/KID Recordings
- She (Karen Gibson-Roc & DJ Hen Boogie) - 2018 13Orange Records
- I Will Not Turn Back ft. Sariyah Idan (Dumi Right) - 2018 pH Music
- Music, Muzik, Musique Vol. 3 (DJ Hen Boogie) - 2020 Low Self Discipline

=== Singles ===
- "Hen Boogie vs. KegsOne" - 2005 Sublevel Epidemic Recordings
- "Adore" (with Kissey Asplund) - 2006 Low Self Discipline
- "Summertime" (with Jeni Fujita) - 2006 Low Self Discipline
- "Adore" / "Summertime" split 7” (with Kissey Asplund and Jeni Fujita) - 2008 Traveller Records - Finland
- "Tsakemo" (with Anbuley) - 2011 Seayou Entertainment - Austria
- "Kemoo' Yoo KeKe" (DJ Hen Boogie Feeli Feeli Remix) (Anbuley) - 2011 Seayou Entertainment - Austria
- "D.O.D. (DJ HEN BOOGIE SATURDAY NIGHT RE-WORK)" (Monsterheart) - 2011 Seayou Entertainment - Austria
- "Danger Ahead" b/w "Dirty Blonde" (Vanessa Daou) - 2013 Daou Music/KID Recordings
- "Danger Ahead" (The Remixes) (Vanessa Daou) - 2013 Daou Music/KID Recordings
- "Yehowa"(Anbuley) - 2019 Low Self Discipline
- "Dirty Thang (DJ Hen Boogie Remix)" (Kinny & Horne) - 2019 Low Self Discipline/Tru Thoughts
