= Masha (singer) =

American singer

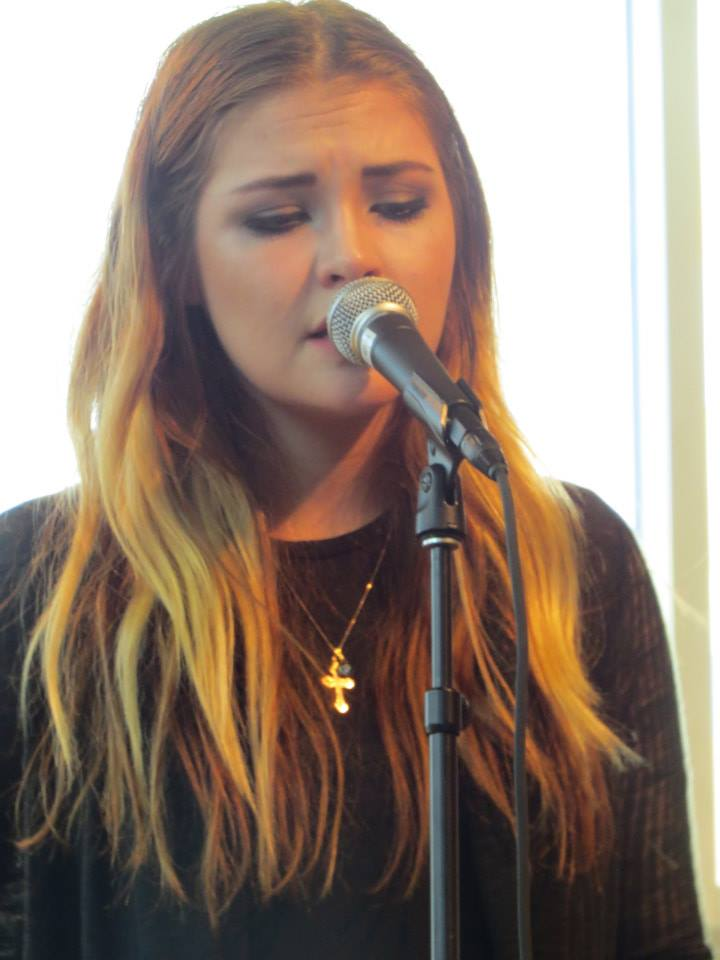
- Masha performs at University of Missouri–Kansas City (2013)

Background information
- Born: Masha Shirin; 1990 or 1991 (age 34–35); Latvia
- Genres: Alternative rock; post-grunge; pop rock; electronica
- Occupation: Singer-songwriter
- Instruments: Vocals; guitar
- Years active: 2012–present
- Label: Weirdo Workshop
- Website: thenameismasha.com

Masha Shirin (born 1990 or 1991), professionally known as Masha, is a Latvian-born American pop/rock singer-songwriter.

== Career ==
On June 5, 2012, Masha was featured on VH1's Big Morning Buzz Live show, where she performed a rendition of Rihanna's "Where Have You Been", and "Payphone" by Maroon 5.

In 2013, Masha's cover of the Nirvana song "Come as You Are" was picked up by the Lifetime channel to promote its series Witches of East End.

Her debut EP, Stupid, Stupid Dreams, was released on October 22, 2013; it was co-produced by Claude Kelly and Nathan Chapman.

In January 2014, Masha was chosen by a judging panel highlighted by Fall Out Boy, Emeli Sandé, and Austin Mahone as one of 40 finalists out of more than 2,000 competing American singers and bands for the CBS Grammy Gig of a Lifetime.

Masha covered "Werewolves of London" for a Three Olives Vodka campaign which was featured in a video; the song was released on December 5, 2014. Its music video was released on December 10.

In 2015, Masha released her single "Mr. Presley" on the independent label Weirdo Workshop.

== Personal life ==
Masha was born in Latvia but raised in New Jersey. As of August 2014, she has homes in Nashville and Brooklyn.
