= The Legion of Extraordinary Dancers =

American web series

- Genre: Dance; Action; Drama
- Created by: Jon M. Chu
- Narrated by: Roger Aaron Brown
- Composers: Nathan Lanier; Paul Dateh
- Country of origin: United States
- Original language: English
- No. of seasons: 3
- No. of episodes: 30

Production
- Executive producers: Jon M. Chu; Scott Ehrlich; Hieu Ho; Larry Tanz
- Production locations: Los Angeles, California
- Cinematography: Alice Brooks
- Running time: 10 minutes
- Production company: Agility Studios

Original release
- Network: Hulu
- Release: July 7, 2010 – September 22, 2011

The Legion of Extraordinary Dancers, commonly called The LXD, is an American web series that premiered on Hulu. The series follows two groups of rival dancers: the Alliance of the Dark, who are the villains, and the Legion of Extraordinary Dancers, the heroes, who discover they have superpowers referred to as "the Ra" through their dance abilities. The entire story takes place over hundreds of years, beginning in the 1920s, up to the year 3000.

The series was created, co-directed, and co-produced by Jon M. Chu, who says he was inspired to create it by Michael Jackson's "Thriller" and "Smooth Criminal" music videos and by the dancers he met while filming the movie Step Up 2 the Streets. The series was choreographed by Christopher Scott and Harry Shum, Jr., with assistant choreography by Galen Hooks. (Note: Chris Scott, Harry Shum, and Galen Hooks are the main choreographers; however, other choreographers have been brought in throughout the series. Jonathan "Legacy" Perez choreographed season one's first episode, "The Tale of Trevor Drift". Jamal Sims choreographed season three's episode "Can't Dance". Dee Caspery choreographed season three's episode "Mess in Aisle 7". Kenneth "Free" Crawford and Mike Song choreographed season three's episode "Reprogram".) Members had a wide variety of specialties, including hip-hop, krumping, contemporary, tricking, popping, b-boying, jazz, tap, and ballet. All of the choreography and stunts were real. There were no special effects or wire work, and the entire series was shot on location without the use of green screens.

50% of the sales of the official LXD T-shirt went to support the work of the nonprofit organization Invisible Children, Inc., Puma was the lead sponsor for the series.

== Members and cast ==
Sources:

- Roger Aaron Brown as The Narrator
- Jaime "Venum" Burgos, Ivan "Flipz" Velez,
  and Josh "Milky" Ayers as The Observers (Note: Venum, Lil Demon, Flipz, Cloud, and Luigi are all members of Skill Methods b-boy crew.)
- Wilbur "Wilpower" Urbina as Joe Drift
- Luis "Luigi" Rosado as Trevor Drift (Note: Luigi was a competitor at Red Bull BC One 2010, a competition where the world's top 16 ranked b-boys battle each other.)
- Carly Lang as Alice Wondershaw
- Daniel "Cloud" Campos as The Illister (Note: Cloud was a competitor at Red Bull BC One 2009.)
- Jeremy Marinas as Justin Starr
- Travis Wong as Jimmy Angel a.k.a. Shado
- Nicholas Braun as Cole Waters
- Chadd "Madd Chadd" Smith as Sp3cimen
- John "J Rock" Nelson as Jasper James a.k.a. The Dark Doctor
- Marie "Pandora" Medina as Autumn
- Shelby Rabara as The Dark Nurse
- Richard "Steelo" Vazquez as Spex
- Vivian Bang as Miss Harlow
- Oscar Orosco as Tendo
- Aaron "Duece" Cooke as Dante
- Christopher "Lil' C" Toler as Z
- Galen Hooks as Ninjato
- William Wingfield as Katana
- Harry Shum Jr. as Elliot Hoo (Note: Shum also stars as Mike Chang on the FOX television show Glee.)
- Aja George as Stereo
- Terence Dickson as Minijack
- Straphanio "Shonnie" Solomon as Phono (Note: Shonnie's uncle is Samuel "Boogaloo Sam" Solomon, the man who invented the popping style of dance.)
- Christa Lewis as Parvine
- Sean "Fresh" Redding as Polo
- Diva Zappa as Ruth
- Nick Demoura as Murray
- Robert Rich as Gus
- Charlie "VZion" Schmidt as The Prophet (season one) and The Ringmaster (season three)
- Christopher Scott as Copeland
- David "Kid David" Shreibman as Karen a.k.a. The Kidd (Note: Kid David was a competitor at Red Bull BC One in 2008 and 2012.)
- Stephen "tWitch" Boss as Dr. E
- Harmony Costa, Antwan Davis, and Khalid Freeman as Beat Bullies
- Caity Lotz as Taylor Jensen
- Adedamola "Nugget" Orisagbemi, Nicholas "Slick" Stewart, and Marc "Marvelous" Inniss as The Eaters
- Jesse "Casper" Brown as Peetie a.k.a. Fangz
- Anis Cheurfa as Achilles (Note: Anis Cheurfa plays the role of Rinzler in the 2010 film Tron: Legacy.)
- Carey Ysais as Karey (Note: Carey Ysais is the co-creator of The Carnival: Choreographer's Ball.)
- Ricardo "Boogie Frantick" Rodriguez as The Wave
- Josue "Beastmode" Figueroa as Stakka
- Danni "Danni G" Gutierrez as Dreads
- Cuong "Tony Styles" Ly as Waru
- Marie "Maryss from Paris" Courchinoux as Scales (Note: Maryss from Paris and Rino are both members of Beat Freaks.)
- Rino Nakasone as Teethe
- Maya Chino as Gills
- Chanel Malvar as Finns
- Brandon Philips as Umbra
- Bryan Tanaka as Umbra
- Dondraico 'Draico' Johnson as Umbra
- Giovanni Watson as Umbra
- JD McElroy as Umbra
- Mykal Bean as Umbra
- Brandon Shaw as Umbra
- Cassidy Noblett as Umbra
- Johnny Erasme as Umbra
- Beau "Casper" Smart as Ox
- Luke Broadlick as Ox
- Ryan "McLovin" Houchin as Ox
- Tara Macken as Ox
- Cameron Boyce as [Young] Jasper James a.k.a. The Dark Doctor
- Ele Keats as Diane James
- Johnathan "Johnny 5" Malstrom as Experiment 2A2
- Peter "Smurf" Quintanilla as Experiment 4K8
- Jefferey "Machine" McCann as Experiment 9S2
- Lorenzo "Devious" Chapman as Experiment J4E
- Patrick "Pakelika 10" Wesley as The Exterminator
- Terrance Harrison as Gimpspark
- Ron "Tempo" Evans Jr., and Soh "Tetris" Tanaka as Rabids
- Adrian "Lobo" Miramontes, Joshua "ACE" Ventura, Mike Song, and Anthony "Anflowny" Lee as Shadows
- Nancy "Asia One" Yu as LXD Elder: The Countess
- Rueben Lucky "Flat Top" Hall as LXD Elder: Groove Guardian
- Andre "Boppin Dre" Diamond as LXD Elder: Black Diamond
- Jerry "Flo Master" Randolph as LXD Elder
- Roger "Orko" Romero as LXD Elder
- Ceasare "Tight Eyez" Willis as LXD Elder: Style Ripper
- Kendall Glover as Lil Rina
- Angelo "Lil Demon" Baligad as Dark Nurse's son

== Series history ==
The first two seasons of The LXD were released in 2010 and the third premiered in August 2011. Shooting first began for the series in February 2009. It took 18 months to complete filming for the first two seasons.

=== The Uprising Begins ===
Season one focuses on the back story of the Legion of Extraordinary Dancers, the "good guys". Each episode introduces each of the characters and their specific dance ability. The season premiered July 7, 2010 on Hulu. The first two webisodes (Chapters in the series), "The Tale of Trevor Drift" and "AntiGravity Heroes", were both released July 7. The remaining eight were released every Wednesday afterward.

Chapter (Episode)	Character(s) introduced	Dance style(s) showcased	Date released
The Tale of Trevor Drift	Trevor Drift; The Observers; The Illister; Alice Wondershaw; Brendan Broman	B-boying	July 7, 2010
AntiGravity Heroes	Jimmy Angel; Justin Starr; Cole Waters	Tricking	July 7, 2010
Robot Lovestory	Sp3cimen; The Dark Doctor; Autumn; The Dark Nurse; Invalid; Shadows	(Ro)boting; Popping; Tutting; Ballet	July 14, 2010
The Uprising Begins	Miss Harlow; Spex; Tendo	B-boying	July 21, 2010
The Lettermakers	Z Dante	Krumping	July 21, 2010
Duet	Ninjato; Katana	Contemporary	July 28, 2010
The Dark Doctor Deal	—	Popping	July 28, 2010
Elliot's Shoes	Elliot Hoo	Hip-hop	August 11, 2010
Fanboyz	Stereo; Phono; Minijack	Krumping; Popping; Hip-hop; Boogaloo	August 18, 2010
I Seen a Man	Copeland	Tap dance Waving	August 18, 2010

=== Secrets of the Ra ===
Season two tells the back story of the villains of The LXD which consist of Organization X—called The Ox—and The Umbras. The second season also premiered with two chapters, "The Legion" and "Lessons", which were released October 26, 2010. The remaining webisodes were released every Wednesday after with the exception of Wednesday, November 24 due to the Thanksgiving holiday.

Chapter (Episode)	Character(s) introduced	Dance style(s) showcased	Date released
The Legion	The Kidd; Elder Jack; Dr.E	B-boying; Popping	October 26, 2010
Lessons	Beat Bullies; Taylor Jensen	Stepping; Tap; Popping; B-boying	October 26, 2010
The Rising	The Eaters; Fangz	Flexing; B-boying	October 28, 2010
Mark of the Ox	Karey; The Wave; Achilles; Waru; Dreads; Stakka	Tricking; Waving; Fire dancing B-boying	November 2, 2010
Tails of War	Scales; Teethe; Gills; Finns	(Ro)boting; Jazz; Jazz Funk; Popping	November 9, 2010
The Greater of Two Evils	The Umbras	Jazz; Free running Krumping; Tricking; Jazz Funk	November 16, 2010
Origins	—	Hip-hop; B-boying	December 1, 2010
Experiments	Experiment 2A2 (Energy Manipulation); Experiment 4K8 (Force Displacement); Experiment J4E (Matter Disruption); Experiment 9S2 (Gravity Distortion); The Exterminator	Ballet; Popping; B-boying	December 8, 2010
The Good, the Bad and the Ra, Part 1	Gimpspark	Tumbling (gymnastics); B-boying; Krumping; Tricking; Popping	December 15, 2010
The Good, the Bad and the Ra, Part 2	The LXD Elders	(Ro)boting; Popping; Tutting; Waving	December 15, 2010

==== Super Ballet ====
There is episode titled "Super Ballet" that was supposed to be presented as part of the series narrative. It was left out of season two because Chu felt it didn't fit into the storyline. He eventually released it in 2012 when The LXD became available on YouTube. The dancing performed in the episode is a mix of ballet and tricking.

=== Rise of the Drifts ===
Season three tells the back story of how the LXD was formed and what led to the Ox and the Umbras uniting to become the Alliance of the Dark. I.aM.mE, a dance crew from Houston, TX who won season six of America's Best Dance Crew, makes an appearance in season three as the Reanimators. Ceasare "Tight Eyez" Willis, the creator of the dance style krumping, also appears in season three as the character of Style Ripper, one of the LXD Elders. Season three premiered on August 11, 2011, with two chapters: "The Extraordinary 7" and "Ashes". With the exception of September 1, the rest of the chapters in the season were released weekly on Thursdays.

Chapter (Episode)	Character(s) introduced	Dance style(s) showcased	Date released
The Extraordinary 7	Annabelle; Black Diamond; The Countess; Groove Guardian; Joe Drift; The Mignifisick; Sir Swoop; Style Ripper; Ringmaster; Winston	Bollywood dance Roboting; B-boying; Krumping	August 11, 2011
Ashes	Locking Goons	Locking	August 11, 2011
Forbidden	—	Flamenco	August 18, 2011
Can't Dance	Vivienne	Rhythmic Gymnastics; Burlesque; Hip-hop; Vogue	August 25, 2011
Salvage	Robots	Roboting	September 8, 2011
Reprogram	—	Roboting; Popping; Tutting	September 8, 2011
RA Games	—	B-boying	September 8, 2011
Mess in Aisle 7	The Rinas	Ballet; B-boying	September 15, 2011
Alliance of the Dark	Reanimators	Popping Animation	September 15, 2011
Rise of the Drifts	—	Contemporary; Jazz; B-boying; Popping; Ballet	September 22, 2011

== Reception ==
The LXD is the most viewed original web series on Hulu. AdvertisingAge.com gave the series a favorable review stating "...each episode of 'LXD' packs a wealth of narrative sophistication into its eight or nine minutes. Combine this with the theater-worthy production values and a cast that exerts itself to an ungodly extent, and the end result is—pun time!—extraordinary." Mashable.com called the series "...a game-changer in the way that web series—and the arts—are presented online. Oh yeah, and it's stunning." In its review of season one, PentacleBlogs.org praised the dancing but felt the acting was weak: "At best this Hollywood narrative approach makes The LXD series seem a bit clunky and cheesy, and at worse it detracts from the enjoyment of truly great dancing."

After their performance at TED 2010, The LXD received the longest standing ovation in TED history. In November 2010, The LXD won a Media Vanguard Award for "Best Original Web Series." In January 2011, the series won a Digital Luminary Award in the "Original Web Content" category. In February 2011, it was announced that Jon Chu would win the Pioneer Award at the International Digital Emmy Awards for the series. At the announcement, IATAS President and CEO, Bruce Paisner remarked "Jon M. Chu is one of the most up & coming directing talents of our time and we look forward to honoring him for his innovative contributions to the field of digital entertainment with our Pioneer Prize."

== Live performances ==
The LXD has performed live for YouTube Live '08 and for the TBS Ellen DeGeneres special Ellen's Even Bigger Really Big Show at Caesars Palace. In May 2010, they were the opening act for the Glee Live! tour. They performed by invitation on season six of So You Think You Can Dance, the 2010 TED conference, and the 82nd Academy Awards. In October 2010, the LXD performed at YouTube Play in New York. In December 2010, they performed on the Conan show. In 2011, they joined the cast of Glee again on their second international tour.
