= Forever Now (Ne-Yo song) =

Single by Ne-Yo

from the album R.E.D.
- Released: November 23, 2012
- Genre: Dance-pop; electro house; EDM; progressive house
- Length: 3:41
- Label: Motown
- Songwriters: Shaffer Smith, Mikkel S. Eriksen, Tor E. Hermansen, Paul Baumer, Maarten Hoogstraten, Allen Arthur, Clayton Reilly, Keith Justice
- Producers: Bingo Players, StarGate, Phatboiz

Ne-Yo singles chronology
"Don't Make Em Like You" (2012)	"Forever Now" (2012)	"Play Hard" (2013)

"Forever Now" is a song performed by American singer-songwriter Ne-Yo, taken from his fifth studio album, R.E.D. (2012). It was released on November 23, 2012 by Motown Records as the second international single and fourth overall single from the album. Ne-Yo co-wrote the song with its producers, StarGate, Bingo Players, Phatboiz.

Ne-Yo first performed "Forever Now" on The X Factor Germany on November 25, 2012. The music video was filmed in October 2012 by director Ryan Pallotta and was released on November 30, 2012.

== Track listing ==
Digital download
No.	Title	Length
1.	"Forever Now"	3:41

== Chart performance ==
=== Weekly charts ===
Chart (2012–2013)	Peak position
Australia (ARIA)	51
Austria (Ö3 Austria Top 40)	73
Belgium (Ultratip Bubbling Under Flanders)	19
Belgium (Ultratip Bubbling Under Wallonia)	4
France (SNEP)	140
Germany (GfK)	64
Scottish Singles Sales (Official Charts)	29
Slovakia Airplay (ČNS IFPI)	46
UK Singles (Official Charts)	31
UK Hip Hop/R&B (Official Charts)	9
US Bubbling Under Hot 100 Singles (Billboard)	7
US Hot Dance/Electronic Songs (Billboard)	12
US Pop Airplay (Billboard)	35
US Rhythmic Airplay (Billboard)	21

=== Year-end charts ===
Chart (2013)	Position
US Hot Dance/Electronic Songs (Billboard)	43

== Release history ==
Region	Date	Format	Label
Germany	November 23, 2012	Digital download	Motown
United Kingdom	December 2, 2012	Digital download	Motown
United States	February 12, 2013	Mainstream, rhythmic airplay	Motown
