= Libra Scale =

Studio album by Ne-Yo
- Released: November 22, 2010
- Genres: R&B; Europop
- Length: 41:24
- Labels: Compound; Def Jam
- Producers: D. DoRohn Gough, Chuck Harmony, Rochad Holiday, Jackpot, Sixx Johnson, Ryan Leslie, Antonio "L.A." Reid, Sandy Vee, Stargate, Syience, Derrick White, Curtis Wilson, Jesse "Corparal" Wilson

Ne-Yo chronology
Year of the Gentleman (2008)	Libra Scale (2010)	R.E.D. (2012)

Singles from Libra Scale
- 1. "Beautiful Monster" Released: June 8, 2010; 2. "Champagne Life" Released: July 20, 2010; 3. "One in a Million" Released: September 14, 2010

Libra Scale is the fourth studio album by American singer-songwriter Ne-Yo. It was released on October 27, 2010 in Japan, followed by a release in the United Kingdom on October 29, as well as a release in the United States on November 22, 2010 by Def Jam Recordings and Compound Entertainment. The album was preceded by three singles: its lead Europop-oriented single, and the UK number-one hit "Beautiful Monster", as well the R&B singles "Champagne Life" and "One in a Million".

Upon release, Libra Scale received favorable reviews from most music critics. The album opened at number 9 on the US Billboard 200, selling 112,000 copies in its first week sales, becoming his fourth consecutive top-ten album in the United States following Year of the Gentleman in 2008. It currently holds a 73 out of 100 on Metacritic, which indicates "generally favorable reviews", based on fourteen reviews, and has attained three singles that have achieved moderate Billboard chart success.

== Background and concept ==
According to Ne-Yo, the idea for the album emerged from three influences: his desire to do something different instead of a standard compilation; his interest in science fiction, comic books and Japanese animation; and inspiration from the works of Michael Jackson, particularly Thriller, Moonwalker, and Bad. Originally a short movie was to accompany the album, but such proved not to be viable given time and monetary constraints, so Ne-Yo chose to develop a series of six extended music videos instead. Nevertheless, the film concept continues to influence the work, as he has stated the songs on the album are inspired by the script of the film that he wrote. The album features a number of songs which follow the story of Jerome and Pretti Sinclair.

The album's title is a reference to Libra, Ne-Yo's astrological sign.

The album's concept explores a story questioning morality and both sides of the Libra Scale: the decision between money/power/fame versus love. The story follows three garbage men – Jerome, Clyde and Leroy – who are offered everything they have wanted in return for protecting the city against a forthcoming threat. However, there's a catch: they can never fall in love. When Jerome (Ne-Yo) falls for Pretti Sinclair (Galen Hooks) disaster ensues, and he has to choose between his love for her and the fame, power and money that he had been given, as he must choose between her life and his own.

== Singles ==
"Beautiful Monster" was released as the lead single on June 8, 2010. It peaked at fifty-three on the US Billboard Hot 100 and sixty-one on the US Hot R&B/Hip-Hop Songs chart. The song performed better on the US Dance Club Songs, where it reached number-one on the chart for one week. It became his second number-one on the chart, after "Closer" in 2008. It also performed the best in the UK, where it became his third number-one hit. It also reached the top ten in Japan and Ireland, and achieved moderate success in other international markets. "Champagne Life" was released as the second North American single on July 20, 2010. It peaked at seventy-five on the Billboard Hot 100, eleven on the Hot R&B/Hip-Hop Songs chart, and due to gaining strong digital sales, reached the top forty in Japan. "One in a Million" was released as the third North American and second international single on September 7, 2010. It peaked at eighty-seven on the US Billboard Hot 100 and reached a peak of seventeen on the US Hot R&B/Hip-Hop Songs chart. It also reached the top twenty in the UK and charted in Australia.

== Critical reception ==
Professional ratings
Aggregate scores
Source	Rating
Metacritic	73/100
Review scores
Source	Rating
AllMusic	3.5/5 stars
The A.V. Club	B+
Entertainment Weekly	B+
The Guardian	3/5 stars
HipHopDX	3/5 stars
Los Angeles Times	2.5/4 stars
PopMatters	7/10
Rolling Stone	4/5 stars
Slant	3.5/5 stars
USA Today	3/4 stars

Upon its release, Libra Scale received generally favorable reviews from most music critics. At Metacritic, which assigns a normalized rating out of 100 to reviews from mainstream critics, the album received an average score of 73, based on 14 reviews, which indicates "generally favorable reviews". Jody Rosen of Rolling Stone awarded the album with four stars out of five. She noted that "the real concept here is: Michael Jackson tribute album. And a damn good one." Similarly, Sarah Rodman from The Boston Globe found that Libra Scale was "brimming with feathery bedroom enticements and excited-but-urbane dance-floor exhortations powered by champagne, handclaps, and Michael Jackson-influenced cadences. So far, so much pleasant contemporary R&B." Allmusic editor Andy Kellman gave the album three and a half out of five stars, stating that "Ne-Yo remains a premier source of R&B that is both traditional and contemporary."

Elysa Gardner of USA Today gave the album a score of three stars out of four and said, "This electro-savvy song cycle, involving a squad of superheroes and a love interest with a femme fatale alter ego, may not boast Ne-Yo's strongest hooks to date. But Libra Scales [sic] does confirm his affinity for balancing old-school romance with a youthful, fluid sensuality." Jon Pareles, writing for The New York Times, commented that "Ne-Yo's best songs like "So Sick" from 2006 or "Closer" from 2008, which he doesn't outdo on Libra Scale are driven by obsessive longing, not self-satisfaction. And halfway through the album the tone changes. The music, though still sleek, turns more electronic, and Ne-Yo seizes on Jackson's anxiety as well as his vocal phrasing."

Now's Benjamin Boles wrote: "Thankfully, the [concept album's] goofy storyline doesn't intrude too much on the music itself. In fact, if you didn't read the press release, you wouldn't even notice the half-baked fantasy. Musically, Ne-Yo spends most of his time here worshipping the throne of Michael Jackson ballads, which suits his falsetto crooning quite well. However, it's the handful of upbeat techno-influenced speaker-thumpers that stand out most, revealing his potential to be a much more versatile artist." BBC Music critic Melissa Bradshaw found that Libra Scale "complicates the persona established on his last full length. With 2008's Year of the Gentleman the singer/producer turned his talent for a saccharine, infectious soul ballad into making himself the most desirable man in the world [...] Libra Scale takes the narcissism inherent in that stance, makes it the hero's hubris, and raises him from perfect boyfriend to heartbreaker status. Todd Martens of Los Angeles Times gave the album two and a half out of four stars, commenting that "Ultimately it's admirable that Ne-Yo felt the need to take listeners on a out-of-this-world ride, but he's at his best when sticking closer to home."

== Commercial performance ==
Libra Scale debuted and peaked at number 9 on the US Billboard 200 chart, with first-week sales of 112,000 copies in the United States. It marked Ne-Yo lowest opening sales up to then and was a considerable decline from her previous effort Year of the Gentleman, which had opened to sales of 250,000 units in 2008. On Billboard's component charts, it reached number four on the Top R&B/Hip-Hop Albums chart, becoming his first solo album to miss the top spot. By November 2012, Libra Scale had sold 345,000 domestically.

== Track listing ==
Libra Scale track listing
No.	Title	Writer(s)	Producer(s)	Length
1.	"Champagne Life"	Shaffer Smith; David Gough	Gough	5:23
2.	"Makin' a Movie"	Smith; Derrick White	White	3:52
3.	"Know Your Name"	Smith; Sixx Johnson; Rochad Holiday; Curtis Wilson	Holiday; Johnson; Wilson^{[a]}	4:07
4.	"Telekinesis"	Smith; Jesse Wilson; Anthony Reyes	Jesse "Corparal" Wilson	4:22
5.	"Crazy Love" (featuring Fabolous)	Smith; Ryan Leslie; John Jackson	Leslie	3:50
6.	"One in a Million"	Smith; Charles Harmon	Chuck Harmony	4:03
7.	"Genuine Only"	Smith; Reginald Perry; Samuel Jean	Syience	3:56
8.	"Cause I Said So"	Smith; Joel Augustin; Alain Biamby	Jackpot	3:49
9.	"Beautiful Monster"	Smith; Mikkel Storleer Eriksen; Tor Erik Hermansen; Sandy Wilhelm	StarGate; Sandy Vee	4:11
10.	"What Have I Done?"	Smith; Gough	Gough	3:51
Total length:				41:24

Japan bonus track
No.	Title	Writer(s)	Producer(s)	Length
11.	"Beautiful Monster" (Tony Moran edit)	Smith; Eriksen; Hermansen; Wilhelm	StarGate; Vee; Tony Moran^{[a]}	4:33

Deluxe edition bonus DVD
No.	Title	Length
1.	"Life on the Libra Scale"	9:38
2.	"Libra Scale" (trailer)	1:54
3.	"Beautiful Monster" (video)	8:09
4.	"Champagne Life" (video)	8:10
5.	"One in a Million" (video)	9:38

Notes

- ^{^[a]} signifies an additional producer

== Personnel ==
Credits for Libra Scale adapted from Allmusic and album 's liner notes.

- Chris Atlas – marketing
- Leesa D. Brunson – A&R coordination
- Erik "Baby Jesus" Coomes – bass (track 5)
- Tyler "Tycoon" Coomes – additional drums (track 5)
- Tom Coyne – mastering
- Kevin "KD" Davis – mixing (tracks 1, 6, 8, 10)
- Mikkel S. Eriksen – producer, engineer, and instrumentation (track 9)
- Fabolous – rap (track 5)
- Tishawn "Go2Man" Gayle – management
- D. Dorohn Gough – producer (tracks 1, 10)
- Jaymz Hardy-Martin III – engineer (tracks 1–8, 10), mixing (tracks 2–7)
- Chuck Harmony – producer (track 6)
- Reynell "Tango" Hay – management
- Tor Erik Hermansen – producer and instrumentation (track 9)
- Rochad Holiday – producer, keyboards, and drum programming (track 3)
- Josh Houghkirk – mix assistant (track 9)
- Jackpot – producer (track 8)
- Q. Nicole Jackson – A&R coordination
- Mike "TrakGuru" Johnson – engineer (track 6)
- Rachel Johnson – stylist
- Sixx Johnson – producer, keyboards, and drum programming (track 3)
- Terese Joseph – A&R administration
- Doug Joswick – package production
- Jerel Lake – assistant mix engineer (tracks 1, 6, 8, 10)
- Ryan Leslie – producer (track 5)
- Damien Lewis – additional engineering (track 9)
- Ne-Yo – vocals (all tracks), executive producer
- Carlos Oyanedel – additional engineering (track 9)
- Brent Paschke – guitar (track 5)
- Will Ragland – art direction and design
- Antonio "L.A." Reid – executive producer
- Anthony Reyes – bass and guitar (track 4)
- Syience – producer (track 7)
- Phil Tan – mixing (track 9)
- Dwayne Thomas, Jr. – additional bass guitar (track 2)
- Sandy Vee – producer, mixing, and instrumentation (track 9)
- Sacha Waldman – photography
- Derrick White – producer (track 2)
- Curtis "Sauce" Wilson – additional production and additional keyboards (track 3)
- Jesse "Corparal" Wilson – producer, music, and programming (track 4)
- Kristen Yiengst – art and photography coordination

== Charts ==
=== Weekly charts ===
Weekly chart performance for Libra Scale
Chart (2010)	Peak position
Australian Albums (ARIA)	36
Australian Urban Albums (ARIA)	5
Belgian Albums (Ultratop Flanders)	28
Belgian Albums (Ultratop Wallonia)	60
Canadian Albums (Nielsen SoundScan)	57
Dutch Albums (Album Top 100)	48
European Albums (Billboard)	20
French Albums (SNEP)	45
German Albums (Offizielle Top 100)	53
Irish Albums (IRMA)	24
Italian Albums (FIMI)	15
Japanese Albums (Oricon)	5
Scottish Albums (Official Charts)	22
South African Albums (RiSA)	10
South Korean Albums (Gaon)	4
Swiss Albums (Schweizer Hitparade)	15
UK Albums (Official Charts)	11
UK R&B Albums (Official Charts)	1
US Billboard 200	9
US Indie Store Album Sales (Billboard)	10
US Top R&B/Hip-Hop Albums (Billboard)	4

=== Year-end charts ===
Year-end chart performance for Libra Scale
Chart (2011)	Position
US Billboard 200	105
US Top R&B/Hip-Hop Albums (Billboard)	29

== Certifications ==
Certifications for Libra Scale
Region	Certification	Certified units/sales
Italy (FIMI)	Gold	30,000^{*}
Japan (RIAJ)	Gold	100,000^{^}
United Kingdom (BPI)	Silver	60,000^{^}
^{*} Sales figures based on certification alone.^{^} Shipments figures based on certification alone.

== Release history ==
Libra Scale release history
Region	Date	Format	Label	Ref(s)
Japan	October 27, 2010	Standard edition (CD, digital download); Deluxe edition (CD + DVD)	Universal Music Japan	
Germany	October 29, 2010	Standard edition (CD, digital download); Deluxe edition (CD + DVD)	Universal Music	
United Kingdom	October 29, 2010	Standard edition (CD, digital download)	Mercury Records	
Hong Kong	November 1, 2010	Standard edition (CD, digital download)	Def Jam Records	
Australia	November 5, 2010	Standard edition (CD, digital download)	Universal Music	
Brazil	November 9, 2010	Standard edition (CD, digital download)	Universal Music	
United States	November 22, 2010	Standard edition (CD, digital download)	Def Jam Records	
