= Don't Make Em Like You =

Single by Ne-Yo featuring Wiz Khalifa

from the album R.E.D.
- Released: October 22, 2012
- Recorded: 2012
- Genre: R&B
- Length: 4:10
- Label: Motown
- Songwriter(s): Shaffer Smith, Harmony Samuels, Cameron Thomaz
- Producer(s): Harmony Samuels

Ne-Yo singles chronology
"Turn Around" (2012)	"Don't Make Em Like You" (2012)	"Forever Now" (2012)

Wiz Khalifa singles chronology
"Remember You" (2012)	"Don't Make Em Like You" (2012)	"Die Young" (2012)

"Don't Make Em Like You" is a song by American singer-songwriter Ne-Yo, first released on SoundCloud on October 3, 2012 and then for digital download on October 22, 2012 as the third single for his fifth studio album R.E.D. (2012). The song features American rapper Wiz Khalifa and was produced by Harmony.

== Charts ==
Chart (2012)	Peak position
US Billboard Hot R&B/Hip-Hop Songs	47

== Release history ==
Country	Date	Format
United States	October 22, 2012	Digital download
United States	October 23, 2012	Urban radio
