= Pandora Marie =

American dancer and choreographer

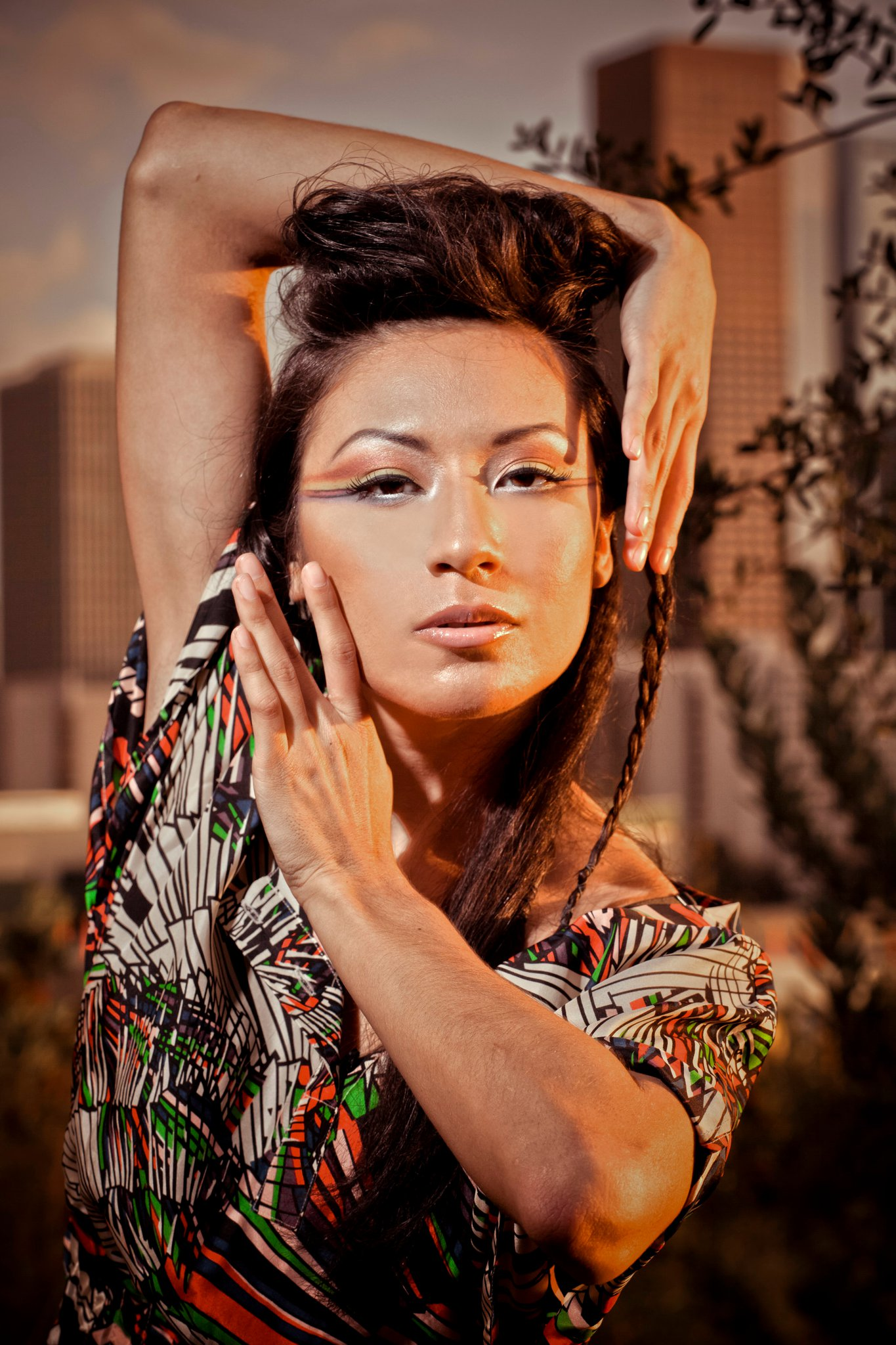
- Pandora Marie in Los Angeles
- Born: Marie Faye Medina; July 25, 1981 (age 45); Santa Ana, California, U.S.
- Occupations: Dancer, choreographer
- Years active: 2002–present
- Awards: Performing Arts "Achievement Award" - Lowak Sho'li (Carry The Fire) First American Humanities Forum (Chickasaw Nation); Most Outstanding Female Popper - LA Hip-Hop Dance Awards; Radiotron 2003 (LA); Radiotron 2004 (LA); B. Supreme London (UK); Freestyle Style Session (LA); How The West Was Won (LA); Take It Personal (AZ); Floor Wars (LA); Cloud Cypher (Canada)
- Website: Little Box Of Hope; Pandora Marie

Marie "Pandora" Medina, aka Pandora or Pandora Marie (born Marie Faye Medina, July 25, 1981), is an American dancer and choreographer who specializes in the "tutting" and "popping" dance styles. She is a member of the Style Elements Crew, The LXD and Venus Fly. Pandora's career has spanned over fifteen years, primarily as part of the popping dance funk culture.

== Dance career ==
Pandora Marie has worked with musicians such as Common and Pharrell, Justin Bieber, Trey Songs, Flo-Rida, Sean Kingston, David Guetta, Steve Aoki, Skrillex, LMFAO and Gina Rodriguez. Pandora is best known for the Step Up 3D "tutting" scene, a standing ovation on So You Think You Can Dance, a Microsoft Surface commercial, her lead role as Autumn in Jon M Chu's The LXD (The Legion of Extraordinary Dancers), and her supporting role as Karla in the Youssef Delara and Michael D. Olmos movie Filly Brown. The Danish magazine Gaffa described Pandora as "one of the best Electric Boogie dancers in the world" after her performance in the Danish show "Menneske Robotten" ("The Human Robot"). The reviewer went on to state that Pandora Marie, and her fellow dancer Koichiro Mori made the dance look easy despite being technically difficult.

In recent years Pandora Marie has expanded her work into the theater and other creative directions. She has performed in theatrical pieces for Little Box Of Hope and DS2DIO, and has worked with Cirque du Soleil and Cirque Éloize. Pandora has also held the principal role of Clara in The Nutcracker in Tivoli, Copenhagen, Denmark and performed many principal roles in award-winning theatrical productions throughout the US, Scandinavia, and Europe.

== Personal life ==
Pandora is the co-founder and artistic director of Little Box Of Hope (a production company / creative collective) alongside her fiancé. She also has worked with G Koop and Darrick Quali-D Fields and has original songs, poetry and music sold on iTunes, Spotify and other music platforms.

Pandora is both Native American and Mexican American. Her native tribes are Chickasaw and Choctaw and she is a citizen of the Chickasaw Nation.

In 2011 Pandora Marie participated in the "Rise Up and Dance" project, teaching kids to dance as a way to give them a purpose in life. She said, "Dancing is what saved me from going down the wrong path. I want to help and inspire kids just like I was inspired by the dancers in my neighborhood".

== Working with Jon M. Chu ==
In 2009 Pandora was contacted on YouTube and personally cast by Now You See Me 2 director Jon M. Chu in the role of Autumn in the popular online dance series The LXD: Legion of Extraordinary Dancers. This relationship led to many other collaborations such as Disney's Step Up film series, NASA's Earth Chorus, The Conan O'Brien Show, BMW Mini Cooper, Google Zietgeist Conference and more. Her dancing in Step Up 3D was described by one reviewer by stating that Pandora Marie "will have you so hypnotized with her finger tuts... it’ll be nothing short of bewitching".

== Awards and honors ==
Pandora was presented with an award for "Most Outstanding Female Popper" and has held titles in dance competitions all around the world ("battles") Radiotron, UK B. Supreme, Freestyle Style Session, How The West Was Won, Take It Personal, Floor Wars, and more. She is considered to be an influential figure in street-dance culture.

== Filmography ==
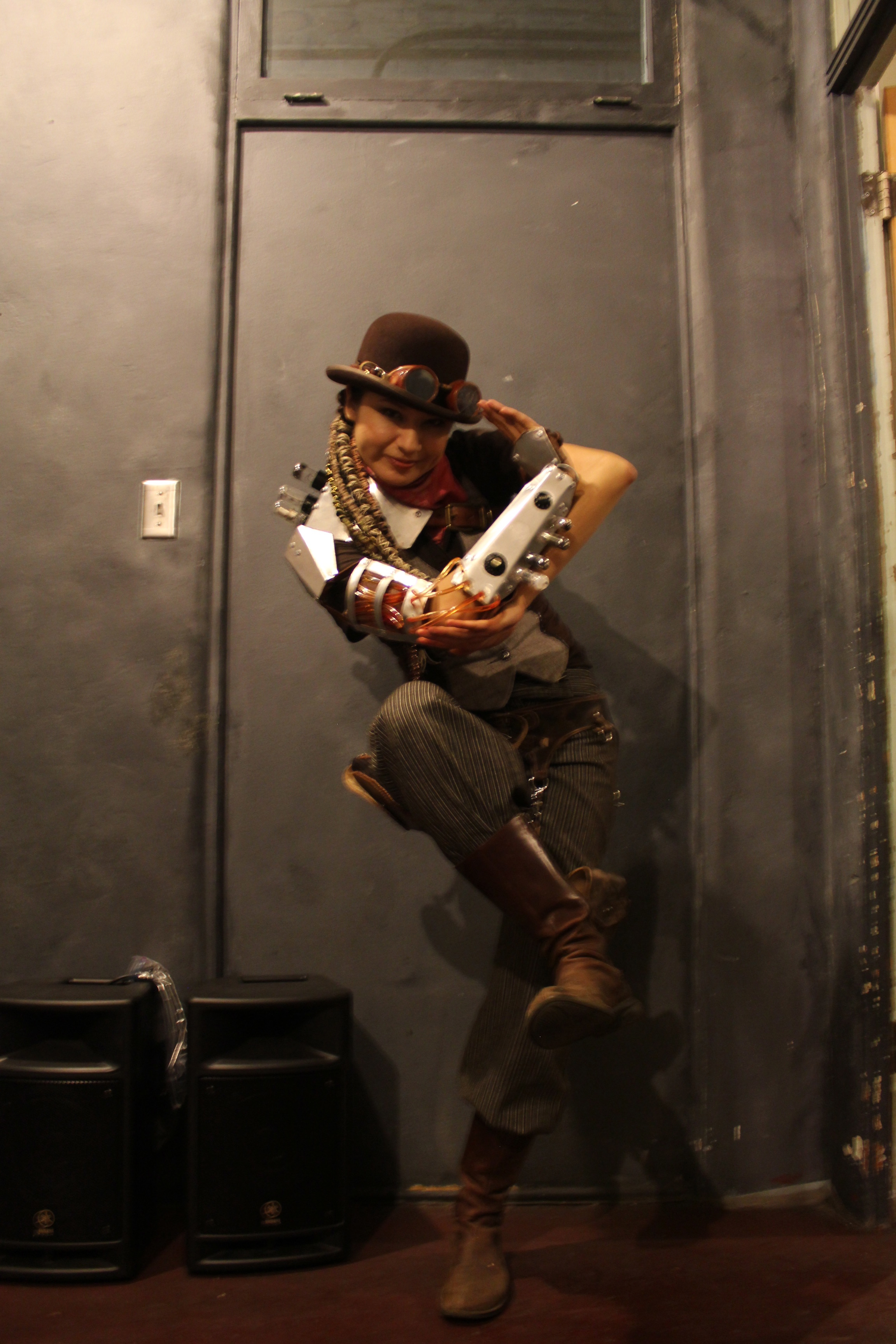
Pandora Marie backstage for Justin Bieber's "Santa Claus Is Coming To Town" (Arthur Christmas)

- THE LXD
- Step Up 3D
- Filly Brown

== Television and film roles ==
Feature films

- Step Up 3D (Principal Dancer, Director: Jon M. Chu)
- Filly Brown (Actress / Principal Dancer, Edward J. Olmos Productions)

Web series

- The LXD (Actress / Principal Dancer, Director: Jon M. Chu)

Television

- So You Think You Can Dance (Featured Dancer, FOX)
- Conan O'Brien Show (Featured Dancer, Choreographer: Chris Scott)

Short films

- S2DIO City "The Bell" (Principal Dancer, Director: Chris Scott)
- Dancing With Devotion (Principal Dancer, Director: Alexander Mercado)
- The Siren (Principal Dancer; Director: Roxy Shih)

== Music videos ==
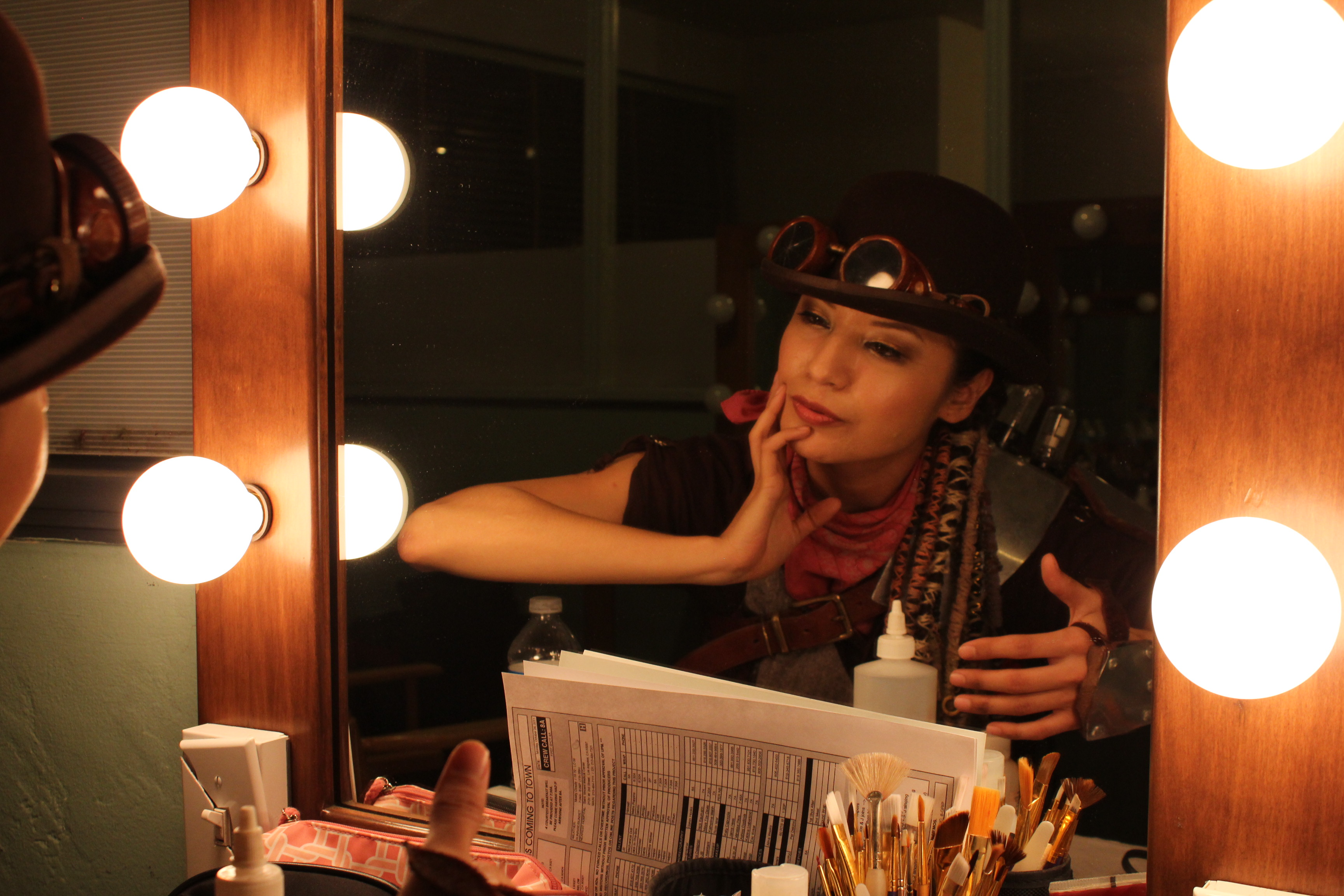
Pandora Marie getting ready for Justin Bieber's "Santa Claus Is Coming To Town" music video

- Justin Bieber - "Santa Claus Is Coming To Town" (Featured Dancer)
- Justin Bieber - "Eenie Meenie" (Featured Dancer)
- The Mast - "UpUpUp" (Principal Dancer)
- David Guetta / Flo Rida - "Club Can't Handle Me" (Featured Dancer)
- Trey Songz - "Already Taken" (Featured Dancer)
- Common - "Universal Mind Control" (Featured Dancer)

== Theatrical and concert stage performances ==
Theater performances

- Cirque Du Soleil / Cirque Eloize "I.D." show (Principal Dancer, International Tour)
- Carmen (Principal Dancer, Denmark)
- The Nutcracker (Principal Dancer, Denmark)
- Menneske Robotten ("Human Robot"; Principal Dancer, Denmark)
- "Awaken Tour" (Pandora Marie Solo Act, National Tour)
- "Illuminated Manuscript" ("Ereshkigal"; featured dancer)

Concerts

- So You Think You Can Dance (Featured Performer, Los Angeles)
- BMW Mini Cooper (Featured Performer, China)
- Google Zeitgeist Conference (Featured Performer, London)
- Hulu Upfront (Featured Performer, New York)
- Microsoft Surface (Featured Performer, China)
- Roskilde Festival, 2010 (Featured Performer, Denmark)
- Artists: Skrillex, Steve Aoki, Afrojack, LMFAO (Featured Performer, Las Vegas)

== Commercials ==
- Microsoft Surface (Featured Dancer)
- The Cosmopolitan Rose.Rabbit.Lie (Principal Dancer)
- Otra Vez / Sierra Nevada (Principal Dancer)
