= Beautiful Monster =

2010 single by Ne-Yo

Single by Ne-Yo

from the album Libra Scale
- Released: June 8, 2010
- Studio: Roc the Mic (New York City)
- Genre: Pop; dance
- Length: 4:11 (album version); 3:21 (radio edit)
- Label: Def Jam
- Songwriters: Shaffer Smith; Mikkel S. Eriksen; Tor Erik Hermansen; Sandy Wilhelm
- Producers: Stargate; Sandy Vee

Ne-Yo singles chronology
"Super High" (2010)	"Beautiful Monster" (2010)	"Champagne Life" (2010)

"Beautiful Monster" is a song by American singer Ne-Yo from his fourth studio album, Libra Scale (2010). The song was released to iTunes as the album's first single on June 8, 2010, by Def Jam Recordings. The song was written by Ne-Yo, Mikkel S. Eriksen, Tor Erik Hermansen and Sandy Wilhelm, and it was produced by Stargate and Sandy Vee. It has received a positive reception, with Ne-Yo's vocals being compared to Michael Jackson. A 9-track remix EP of the song was released on July 27, 2010.

== Background ==
"Beautiful Monster"'s original cover art was revealed online on May 21, 2010, which was a close-up of Ne-Yo's profile with a mysterious woman lurking in a forest in the background. Although another cover art was revealed with the forest background altered to a city, including buildings and a flashing car light, the original cover with the forest background was eventually selected as the official cover art. The song was written by Ne-Yo and produced by longtime collaborators Stargate, responsible for producing some of his biggest hits such as "So Sick", "Because of You", and "Closer". "Beautiful Monster" premiered online on May 25, 2010.

== Composition ==
"Beautiful Monster"
A sample of "Beautiful Monster", a pop song which includes influences of Eurodisco and new rave, featuring Ne-Yo's R&B vocal stylings, which have been compared to those of Michael Jackson

"Beautiful Monster" is an uptempo pop and dance song, containing electropop, new rave, house and Eurodisco influences, featuring Ne-Yo's vocals over "strobing dancefloor beats." "Beautiful Monster" has been described as "spookily anthemic", having "big filler sweeps", and "decimated snare builds" of '90s EDM. The song has been compared to the sound of Michael Jackson, specifically Ne-Yo's "backing vocals and audible breath intake" according to Bill Lamb of About.com. Alistair Dickinson of PopMatters said "Ne-Yo’s Michael Jackson-esque wails and screams are still in full effect". The song is composed of "out-of-tranc-y keyboard lines" and a "throbbing drumbeat."

"Beautiful Monster" consists lyrically about being attracted to a dangerous woman. August Brown of the Los Angeles Times compared the "topical and sonic" content of the song to Lady Gaga's work on The Fame Monster, specifically the lyrical basis of "Bad Romance" and "Monster". The song is written in common time with a maintaining tempo of 125 beats per minute, written in F minor, and Ne-Yo's vocals range two octaves from F_{4} to B♭_{5}.

Ne-Yo described the song to UK music writer Pete Lewis: "The song itself is a small piece of a much larger puzzle. In that the album it comes from - Libra Scale - is based upon this short story that I wrote, which basically follows these three characters who are forced to choose between money-power-and-fame versus love... And the song 'Beautiful Monster' actually represents the mind-state of the man in the story whenever he comes into contact with his love interest-slash-nemesis. Whose name is Diamond Eye, and who really is best described as 'a beautiful monster'! You know, she's forbidden fruit; she's that girl who you know is gonna be nothing but trouble... But - because she's so intriguing - even if it literally might cost you your life, you still cannot resist her aura. Which is where the hook 'She's a monster, a beautiful monster; But I don't mind' comes from!" Critical with the song, he later described the song as "Closer's "ugly cousin."

== Critical reception ==
August Brown of the Los Angeles Times complimented the song, calling it Ne-Yo's "most evocative effort", adding that "no male pop singer short of T-Pain can stack harmonies better right now, and when he peels off those runs of 'I don't mind' after the choruses". However Brown commented that, "Ne-Yo is better at writing dark edges into songs than performing them himself; he's just too put-together to truly do the freakily possessed lover act." Bill Lamb of About.com favored the track's "burbling Eurodisco feel", and commented, "It also always feels like the ghost of Michael Jackson is never far away in the music of Ne-Yo." Alistair Dickinson of PopMatters also gave the song a positive review, comparing it to Michael Jackson. Brad Wete of Entertainment Weekly compared the song to Ne-Yo's previous hit "Closer", stating, "Ne-Yo’s brand of progressive R&B has been a winner so far. 'Monster' should be a beast, too." Although Mariel Concepcion of Billboard said the song did not boast the lyricism of Ne-Yo's past songs, she said, "the beat's thumping bassline and the singer/songwriter's smooth voice make for a perfect combination on this summer hit in the making."

== Chart performance ==
"Beautiful Monster" was most successful in the United Kingdom, where it became Ne-Yo's third single to top the UK Singles Chart after "So Sick" in March 2006 and "Closer" in June 2008, and reached the top ten in Korea and Italy, becoming Ne-Yo's highest peak there. It was certified Platinum in Italy for sales over 30,000 units. In the U.S., however, it didn't even crack the top 50 of the Billboard Hot 100, peaking at number fifty-three. It also underperformed on the Hot R&B/Hip-Hop Songs chart, peaking at sixty-one. The song failed to match the success of the lead singles from his previous three albums, "So Sick", "Because of You" and "Closer", which all reached the top 10. The song, however, did top the Dance Club Songs chart for one week, making it his second number one there after "Closer" from 2008.

== Music video ==
The video for "Beautiful Monster", directed by Wayne Isham, premiered on July 14, 2010, along with the video for "Champagne Life". The video begins with Ne-Yo stumbling through an alley (possibly intoxicated) and causing havoc with his supernatural powers. These powers were demonstrated in the music video for "One in a Million" where he levitates a rose to a woman to court her and stops a moving taxi to keep her from ignoring him. After throwing a car and causing an explosion, Ne-Yo encounters two men with long dreadlocks and white suits that drop from the sky to fight him. Both men have glowing, white, right eyes that represent the "Beautiful Monster's" influence over them. After choreographed fighting, Ne-Yo defeats the two men and quickly arrives at a red carpet event. He then walks into a club where all of a sudden, everyone freezes mid-action. Some of these clubbers start dancing (all with the glowing white eye) and send Ne-Yo into another room where the "Beautiful Monster" waited. After a heated struggle, the Monster flashes both her silver, glowing eyes at Ne-Yo. For the rest of the video, Ne-Yo has his hat over his right eye and dances with other people in white suits, showing that the "Beautiful Monster" had won and he was now hers.

This video is the last in a series that Ne-Yo created. The first music video in the series is "Champagne Life" which shows Ne-Yo to be a part of a crime-fighting group enjoying money, women and fame. The second video of the series is "One in a Million" in which Ne-Yo has his pick of the women but spends his time trying to court a seemingly uninterested girl. The third video of the series is "Beautiful Monster" which shows that the Monster who leads to Ne-Yo's demise is actually the uninterested girl from the previous video.

== Promotion ==
Ne-Yo performed the song for the first time in Brooklyn on June 14, 2010. He also performed the song on So You Think You Can Dance on July 1, 2010, on the Brazilian TV show Altas Horas, on August 14, 2010, and on German talent show Popstars: Girls forever on September 23, 2010, and on This Morning on September 7, 2010.

== Track listing ==
- Digital download
1. "Beautiful Monster" – 4:11
- German CD single
1. "Beautiful Monster" (Album Version) – 4:12
2. "Beautiful Monster" (Mixin' Marc & Tony Svejda Remix Edit) – 4:11
- Digital download (The Remixes)
1. "Beautiful Monster" (Mixin' Marc & Tony Svejda Remix Edit) – 4:11
2. "Beautiful Monster" (Tony Moran & Warren Rigg Save The Soul Edit) – 4:33
3. "Beautiful Monster" (Low Sunday Terrified Edit) – 4:24
4. "Beautiful Monster" (Mixin' Marc & Tony Svejda Remix Extended) – 6:36
5. "Beautiful Monster" (Tony Moran & Warren Rigg Save The Soul Club) – 9:43
6. "Beautiful Monster" (Low Sunday Terrified Club) – 7:22
7. "Beautiful Monster" (Mixin' Marc & Tony Svejda Remix Instrumental) – 6:36
8. "Beautiful Monster" (Tony Moran & Warren Rigg Save The Soul Anthem Dub) – 9:43
9. "Beautiful Monster" (Low Sunday Terrified Dub) – 8:00

== Personnel ==
- Songwriting – Shaffer Smith, Mikkel S. Eriksen, Tor Erik Hermansen, Sandy Wilhelm, K.E.
- Production – Stargate, Sandy Vee
- Recording – Mikkel S. Eriksen
- Mixing – Sandy Vee, Phil Tan
- Additional engineering – Carlos Oyandel, Damien Lewis
- Mixing assistant – Josh Houghkirk
- Instruments – Mikkel S. Eriksen, Tor Erik Hermansen, Sandy Vee
- Vocals – Ne-Yo

== Charts ==
=== Weekly charts ===
Chart (2010)	Peak position
Australia (ARIA)	53
Austria (Ö3 Austria Top 40)	20
Belgium (Ultratop 50 Flanders)	16
Belgium (Ultratop 50 Wallonia)	13
Canada Hot 100 (Billboard)	40
Czech Republic Airplay (ČNS IFPI)	40
Denmark (Tracklisten)	39
Europe (European Hot 100 Singles)	7
Finland (Suomen virallinen lista)	14
France Download (SNEP)	50
Germany (GfK)	13
Hungary (Single Top 40)	9
Hungary (Rádiós Top 40)	19
Ireland (IRMA)	9
Israel International Airplay (Media Forest)	1
Italy (FIMI)	3
Japan Hot 100 (Billboard)	6
Netherlands (Dutch Top 40)	25
Netherlands (Single Top 100)	48
New Zealand (Recorded Music NZ)	20
Russia Airplay (TopHit)	12
Scottish Singles Sales (Official Charts)	2
Slovakia Airplay (ČNS IFPI)	11
South Korea (GAON)	3
Sweden (Sverigetopplistan)	51
Switzerland (Schweizer Hitparade)	15
UK Singles (Official Charts)	1
UK Hip Hop/R&B (Official Charts)	1
US Billboard Hot 100	53
US Dance Club Songs (Billboard)	1
US Hot R&B/Hip-Hop Songs (Billboard)	61
US Pop Airplay (Billboard)	26
US Rhythmic Airplay (Billboard)	24

=== Year-end charts ===
Chart (2010)	Position
Belgium (Ultratop Flanders)	66
Brazil (Crowley)	90
European Hot 100 Singles	73
Germany (Official German Charts)	92
Hungary (Rádiós Top 40)	82
Italy (FIMI)	17
Italy Airplay (EarOne)	34
Japan Adult Contemporary (Billboard)	60
Russia Airplay (TopHit)	82
Switzerland (Schweizer Hitparade)	67
UK Singles (Official Charts Company)	67
US Dance Club Songs (BIllboard)	39

== Certifications ==
Region	Certification	Certified units/sales
Brazil (Pro-Música Brasil)	Platinum	60,000^{‡}
Italy (FIMI)	Platinum	30,000^{*}
United Kingdom (BPI)	Gold	400,000^{‡}
^{*} Sales figures based on certification alone.^{‡} Sales+streaming figures based on certification alone.

== Release history ==
=== Radio adds ===
Country	Date	Format
United States	June 8, 2010	Mainstream airplay
United States	June 8, 2010	Rhythmic airplay

=== Purchaseable release ===
Country	Date	Format	Label
United States	June 8, 2010	Digital download	Island Def Jam
Canada	June 8, 2010	Digital download	Island Def Jam
United Kingdom	August 1, 2010	Digital download	Mercury

== See also ==
- List of UK Singles Chart number ones of the 2010s
- List of UK R&B Chart number-one singles of 2010
- List of number-one dance singles of 2010 (U.S.)
