= Weirdo Workshop =

- Founded: 2015
- Founder: Claude Kelly; Chuck Harmony
- Distributor(s): RED Distribution
- Genre: R&B; rock; reggae; pop; alternative; jazz; country
- Country of origin: U.S.
- Location: Nashville, Tennessee
- Official website: weirdoworkshop.com

Weirdo Workshop is an independent record label and artist collective founded by Claude Kelly and Chuck Harmony in 2015. The label's releases are distributed by Sony's RED Distribution.

== History ==
After several years working together as songwriters and producers for artists including Bruno Mars, Miley Cyrus, Britney Spears, Kelly Clarkson, Rihanna and Mary J. Blige, in February 2015, Claude Kelly and Chuck Harmony formed Louis York. The R&B group was the first act on their imprint Weirdo Workshop, in a partnership with creative shop Night Agency, with releases to be distributed by Sony's RED Distribution. Louis York's debut EP Masterpiece Theater – Act I was released on September 18, 2015. The follow-up, Masterpiece Theater – Act II, was released on November 18, 2016.

Weirdo Workshop signs and develops artists in a variety of music genres.

On March 14, 2015, Weirdo Workshop partnered with Uber on a showcase featuring Louis York at South by Southwest in Austin, Texas. In October 2015, Weirdo Workshop had a mini-tour in the United States, with a lineup of Louis York, Kes and Masha. The label also includes female band The Shindellas.

A half-hour special about the label, Welcome to Weirdo Workshop, aired on MTV Live on February 12, 2016.

== Artists ==
- Louis York
- The Shindellas
