= Claude Kelly =

American singer-songwriter

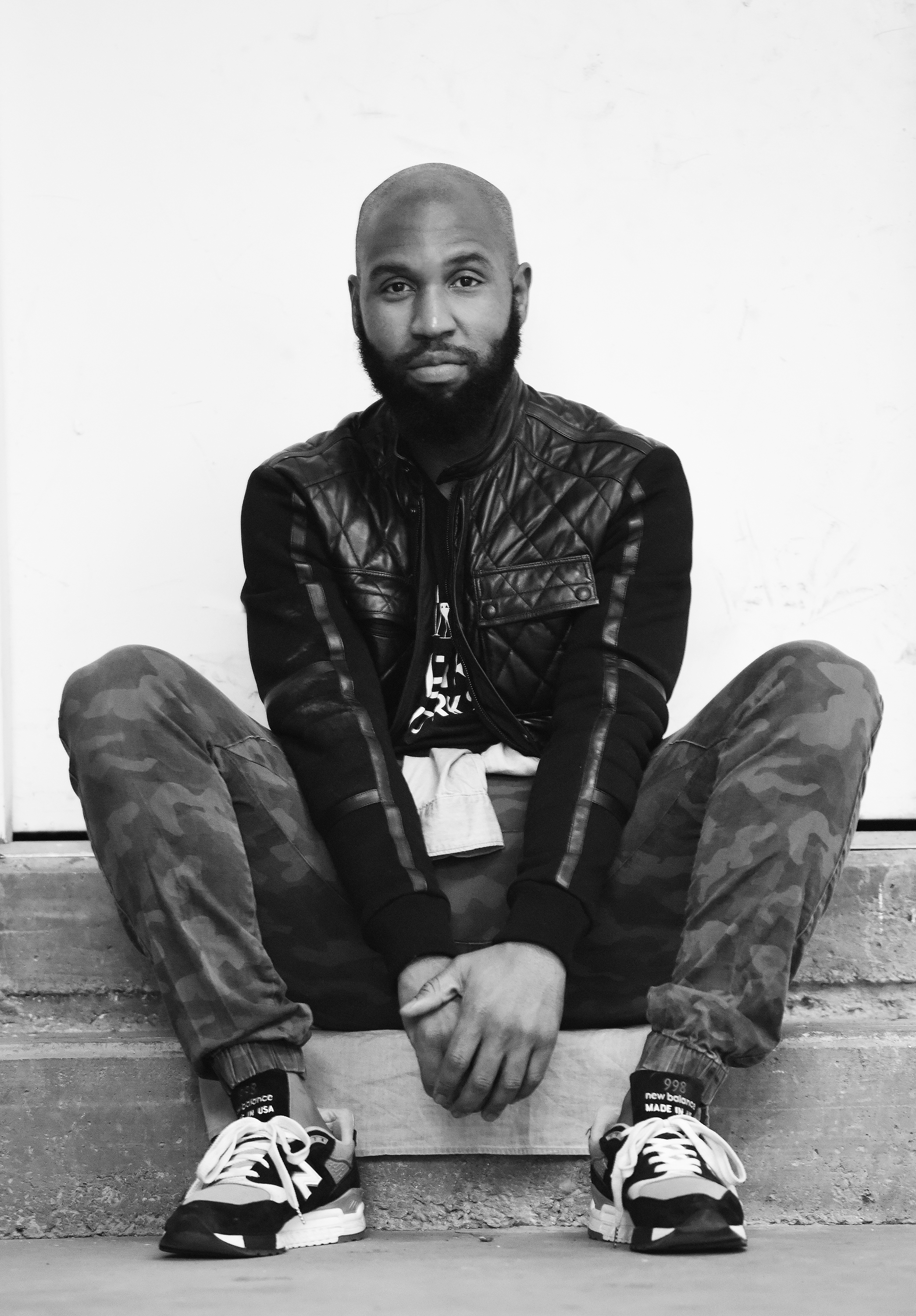
- Kelly in 2015

Background information
- Born: December 27, 1980 (age 45); New York City, U.S.
- Genres: Pop; R&B; soul; dance; country
- Occupations: Singer; songwriter; music producer
- Instruments: Vocals; piano
- Years active: 2002–present
- Labels: Weirdo Workshop; RED Music
- Member of: Louis York
- Producer(s): Chuck Harmony; Dr. Luke

Claude Kelly (born December 28, 1980) is an American record producer, songwriter, and singer. A four-time Grammy Award nominee, he has been credited on commercially successful releases for artists such as Michael Jackson, Whitney Houston, Kelly Clarkson, Britney Spears, Ariana Grande, Bruno Mars, Christina Aguilera, Adam Lambert, Jennifer Lopez, Kesha, Brandy, Keke Wyatt, Tori Kelly, and One Direction. He is one-half of the duo Louis York, which he formed with Chuck Harmony in 2015; the two also co-founded the record label Weirdo Workshop that same year.

== Early life and education ==
Kelly was born and raised in New York City. His Jamaican-born mother introduced him to a variety of music styles, including jazz, reggae, blues and R&B. Growing up, he studied piano and flute at the Third Street Music School Settlement and sang with the New York Boys Choir. Kelly attended Grace Church School, Riverdale Country School, and then Berklee College of Music in Boston, Massachusetts, graduating with a degree in music business/management in 2002.

== Career ==
=== Songwriting ===
After graduating from Berklee, Kelly worked as a session singer on the East Coast, before starting to write his own songs. He placed his first song in 2002, when "You're Taking It" was included on a CD compilation for Japanese clothing line A Bathing Ape. He wrote "Daddy's Little Girl" for Frankie J, which was released as a single in 2006, and led to a publishing contract with Warner/Chappell Music. That year, Kelly was introduced to producer RedOne, and began working with him and Lady Gaga, who was at the time working on her first album. This led to an introduction to Akon. Kelly and Akon co-wrote "Hold My Hand" with Whitney Houston in mind, but Akon liked the song so much that he decided to record it as a duet with Michael Jackson. It was one of Jackson's last recordings, and appeared on his 2010 posthumous album Michael.

Nicknamed the Studio Beast, Kelly has written numerous hits, including the Britney Spears song "Circus", which he wrote with Dr. Luke and Benny Blanco and reached No. 3 on the Billboard Hot 100, and No. 1 on the Billboard Pop Songs and Billboard Hot Dance Club Play charts; Kelly Clarkson's "My Life Would Suck Without You", which he co-wrote with Max Martin and Dr. Luke and hit No. 1 on the Billboard Hot 100; and the Miley Cyrus single "Party in the U.S.A.", written with Dr. Luke and Jessie J, which spent 28 weeks on the Billboard Hot 100 and peaked at No. 2. Kelly co-wrote and recorded backing vocals for "International Love" by Pitbull featuring Chris Brown, which peaked at number 13 on the Billboard Hot 100. He has been nominated for four Grammy Awards: the 2011 Grammy Award for Best R&B Song for Fantasia's "Bittersweet"; two 2012 Grammy Awards, for Song of the Year for Bruno Mars' "Grenade" and Best R&B Song for Ledisi's "Pieces of Me"; and the 2013 Grammy Award for Best R&B Song for Tamia's "Beautiful Surprise". He was named to The Hollywood Reporter's 2013 list of Music's Top 35 Hitmakers.

Kelly has written songs for Whitney Houston, R. Kelly, Miley Cyrus, Olly Murs, Jessie J, Britney Spears, Leona Lewis, John Legend, Faith Evans, Joe Jonas, Jason Derulo, Backstreet Boys, Adam Lambert, Martina McBride, Christina Aguilera, One Direction, The Wanted, and the K-pop girl group Wonder Girls. He co-executive produced Karmin's 2012 EP Hello and Tamia's 2012 album Beautiful Surprise, and co-produced Masha's debut rock EP Stupid, Stupid Dreams in 2013.

=== Louis York ===
In 2014, Kelly and fellow songwriter and producer Chuck Harmony formed the R&B duo Louis York. Their debut EP, Masterpiece Theater – Act I, was released in 2015. The first single, "Clair Huxtable", is an ode to Phylicia Rashad's character on The Cosby Show. The EP was the first release from their music collective Weirdo Workshop, with distribution from Sony's RED Music.

=== Television ===
Kelly served as a vocal producer for the US version of The X Factor in 2011 and 2012. In August 2013, it was announced that he and Jenna Hally Rubenstein were partnering to executive produce and develop a reality television show to find undiscovered music moguls.

== Awards ==
Year	Award	Category	Work	Result
2011	Grammy Award	Best R&B Song	"Bittersweet" by Fantasia	Nominated
2012	Grammy Award	Song of the Year	"Grenade" by Bruno Mars	Nominated
2012	Grammy Award	Best R&B Song	"Pieces of Me" by Ledisi	Nominated
2013	Grammy Award	Best R&B Song	"Beautiful Surprise" by Tamia	Nominated

== Discography ==
=== Louis York ===
Title	Album details
Masterpiece Theater – Act I	Released: September 18, 2015; Formats: Digital download; Label: Weirdo Workshop
Masterpiece Theater – Act II	Released: November 18, 2016; Formats: Digital download; Label: Weirdo Workshop
