= Louis York =

American band

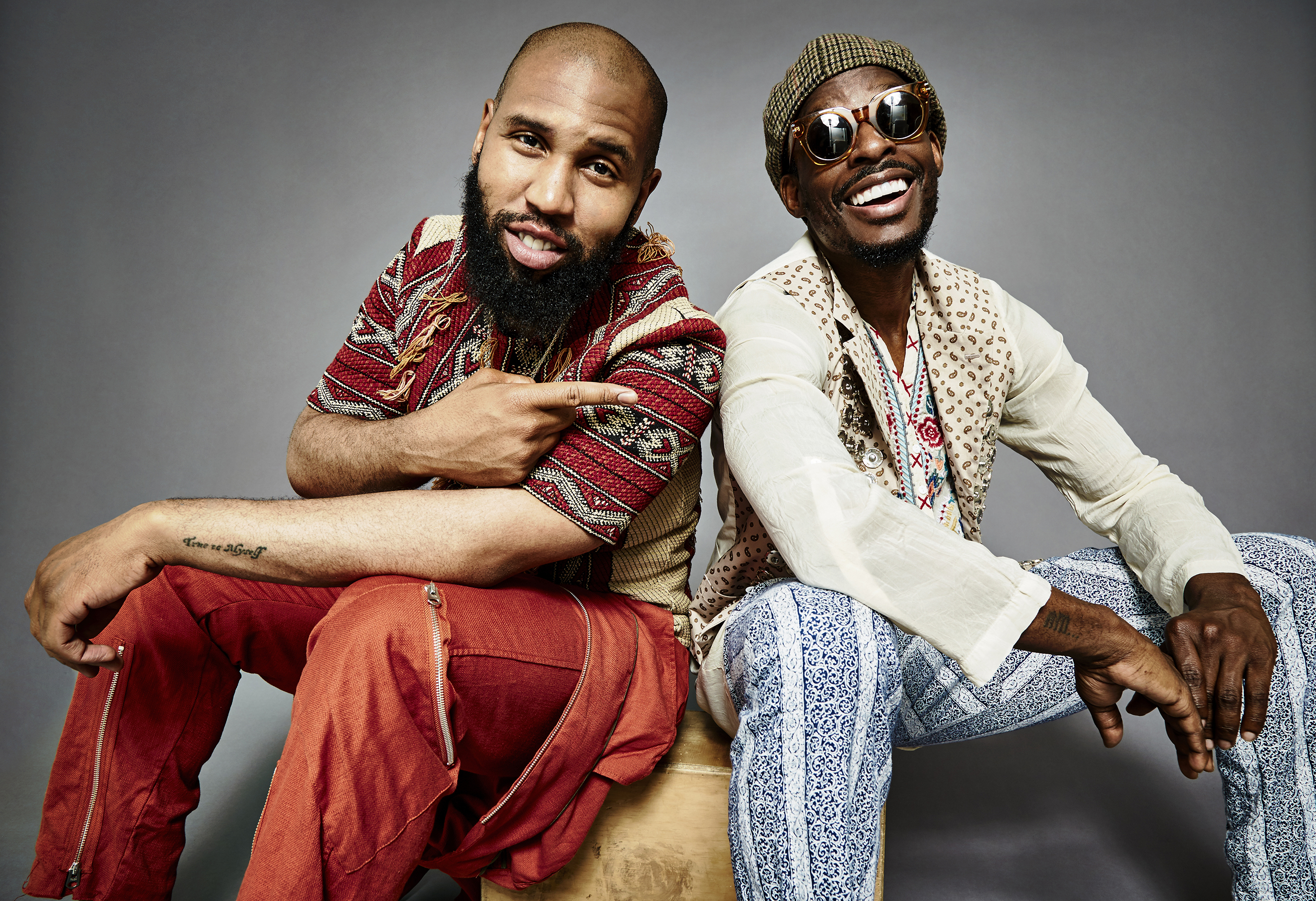

Background information
- Origin: New York, NY
- Genres: R&B, rock, house, jazz, pop
- Years active: 2015–present
- Label: Weirdo Workshop
- Members: Claude Kelly; Chuck Harmony
- Website: louisyork.com

Louis York is an American band formed by Claude Kelly and Chuck Harmony in 2015.

== History ==
Kelly and Harmony first met while working on Chrisette Michele's 2009 album Epiphany. They went on to collaborate as a duo writing and producing tracks for artists including Rihanna, Bruno Mars, Britney Spears, Mary J. Blige, Kelly Clarkson, Jessie J and Miley Cyrus. Wanting to create music that would better reflect their own point of view and move them beyond being songwriters for hire, they formed Louis York. The group name originates from the hometown of its founders, Claude Kelly (New York City) and Chuck Harmony (East St. Louis). They write and produce all the tracks, with Kelly providing vocals and Harmony playing keyboards, guitars, drums and the vocoder. Drawing from several musical influences, such as their backgrounds in church choirs, growing up with R&B and being exposed to Jazz and the Motown sound as children, Louis York describes their music as "world music" in the sense that it is multi-genre and has an international sound. Louis York is the first act on their imprint Weirdo Workshop, whose releases are distributed by Sony's RED Distribution. Based out of a house in Franklin, Tennessee, The Weirdo Workshop exists as a "multi-purpose creative hub" from which the duo produces music, plans for future projects and hosts lectures, book clubs and live shows.

Louis York made their debut with the release of the single "Clair Huxtable" on February 24, 2015. The song celebrates strong women like its namesake, the mother on the television sitcom The Cosby Show. In the music video, Kelly and Harmony are seen searching for a woman like Mrs. Huxtable: strong, smart, sexy and elegant. They released their second single, "Good Drinks, Dumb Jokes", on August 13, 2015.

Masterpiece Theater – Act I, Louis York's debut EP, was recorded in Los Angeles in the summer of 2015, and released on September 18, 2015. The Los Angeles Times described it as "an eclectic mix steeped in hook-driven pop and throwback R&B along with rock and African tribal rhythms." Their follow-up EP, Masterpiece Theater – Act II, was released on November 18, 2016.

In 2019, the duo released their debut album titled American Griots - The Album. The title of the album alludes to the griots of West Africa who are storytellers, poets and songwriters who travel from village to village performing and passing on oral traditions. With the addition of "American", the duo hoped to modernize and personalize the role of the griot. Through the album's title, Louis York attempt to communicate how they see themselves and give artists a renewed sense of responsibility as touring performers.

On April 15, 2025, American Songwriter Magazine announced Louis York as the Jazz Category Winner of the 2024 American Songwriter Song Contest.

== Members ==
- Claude Kelly – vocals
- Chuck Harmony – keyboards, guitars, piano, drums, vocoder

== Discography ==
=== Studio albums ===
Title	Album details
American Griots	Released: October 18, 2019; Formats: Digital download, Vinyl; Label: Weirdo Workshop
Songs with Friends	Released: Aug 30, 2024; Formats: Digital download, CD; Label: Weirdo Workshop

=== Extended plays ===
Title	Album details
Masterpiece Theater – Act I	Released: September 18, 2015; Formats: Digital download; Label: Weirdo Workshop
Masterpiece Theater – Act II	Released: November 18, 2016; Formats: Digital download; Label: Weirdo Workshop
Masterpiece Theater – Act III	Released: October 6, 2017; Formats: Digital download; Label: Weirdo Workshop
The Love Takeover Tour (with The Shindellas)	Released: Jan 14, 2019; Formats: CD; Label: Weirdo Workshop

=== Singles ===
Year	Title	Album
2015	"Clair Huxtable"	Masterpiece Theater – Act I
2015	"Good Drinks, Dumb Jokes"	Masterpiece Theater – Act II
2016	"Don't Play"	Masterpiece Theater – Act II
2017	"I Enjoy You"	Masterpiece Theater – Act III
2018	"No Regrets" (feat. The Shindellas)	American Griots
2018	"What Does Christmas Mean?"	Non-album single
2019	"Don't You Forget"	American Griots
2025	"Sweet Potato Pie"	Non-album single
