= One in a Million (Ne-Yo song) =

Single by Ne-Yo

from the album Libra Scale
- Released: September 14, 2010
- Recorded: 2010
- Studio: Westlake Studios (Los Angeles, CA)
- Genre: R&B
- Length: 4:04
- Label: Def Jam
- Songwriters: Shaffer Smith; Chuck Harmony; Kevin Erondu
- Producer: Chuck Harmony

Ne-Yo singles chronology
"Champagne Life" (2010)	"One in a Million" (2010)	"Give Me Everything" (2011)

Music video
- "One in a Million" on YouTube

"One in a Million" is the third single from singer/songwriter Ne-Yo's fourth studio album Libra Scale. In the UK, the song was released as the second single from the album. The song was released on September 14, 2010 by Def Jam Recordings. "One in a Million" was written by Ne-Yo, Chuck Harmony and Kevin Erondu and produced by Harmony. It reached number 87 on the Billboard Hot 100.

== Background ==
"One in a Million" was one out of two songs that Ne-Yo originally co-wrote with Chuck Harmony for Jamie Foxx.

== Music video ==
Wayne Isham directed video for "One in a Million" premiered on September 3, 2010. The full-length nine-minute video is included on the deluxe edition DVD version of the Libra Scale album.

For continuity, Jerome (Ne-Yo) remembers back to when he first met Pretti Sinclair (Galen Hooks). The video is influenced by Michael Jackson's "The Way You Make Me Feel", where he follows a woman to following her down the street and showing off his dance moves. Ne-Yo, Clyde and Leroy were at a café, and as soon as Sinclair's friends saw the gentleman trio, they immediately joined their table, leaving Sinclair behind. Jerome then tries to draw his attention towards her by floating his drink, Sinclair then advises the waiter to take away the drink and give it to Jerome.He walked up to her, trying to make a conversation. Sinclair, however, thought that Jerome was simply an arrogant man who always tries to get what he wants, and didn't want to befriend him. Jerome then told Clyde and Leroy to get up and do "THE THANG", which was dancing to One in a Million to impress Sinclair. During the bridge, however, Sinclair got angry seeing Jerome dancing with other girls, and left. As the dance finished, Jerome ran off to find Sinclair. After having stopped a cab to get Sinclair, Jerome persuaded her into going out on a dinner date to prove her wrong. The video ends.

== Track listing ==
1. "One in a Million" – 4:04

== Personnel ==
- Songwriting – Shaffer Smith, Chuck Harmony, K.E. on the Track
- Production – Chuck Harmony
- Recording – Mike "TrakGuru" Johnson & Jaymz Hardy-Martin III
- Mixing – Jaymz Hardy-Martin III
- Mixing assistant – Jerel Lake
- Vocals – Ne-Yo

== Charts ==
"One in a Million" became Ne-Yo's eighth top 20 hit as a lead artist and his second consecutive top 20 hit from Libra Scale in the UK. The song entered and peaked at number 20 on the UK Singles Chart and number 4 on the UK R&B Singles Chart on 7 November 2010. It also debuted at number 97 on the Billboard Hot 100 and reached number 87 in its fifth week. The song is Platinum in Italy.

=== Weekly charts ===
Weekly chart performance for "One in a Million"
Chart (2010–2011)	Peak position
Australia (ARIA)	78
Belgium (Ultratip Bubbling Under Flanders)	20
Belgium (Ultratip Bubbling Under Wallonia)	18
European Hot 100 Singles (Billboard)	62
Italy (FIMI)	18
Russia Airplay (TopHit)	10
Scottish Singles Sales (Official Charts)	28
Slovakia Airplay (ČNS IFPI)	54
Switzerland (Schweizer Hitparade)	52
UK Singles (Official Charts)	20
UK Hip Hop/R&B (Official Charts)	4
US Billboard Hot 100	87
US Hot R&B/Hip-Hop Songs (Billboard)	17
US Rhythmic Airplay (Billboard)	28

=== Year-end charts ===
2010 year-end chart performance for "One in a Million"
Chart (2010)	Peak position
Russia Airplay (TopHit)	134

2011 year-end chart performance for "One in a Million"
Chart (2011)	Position
Italy (Musica e dischi)	90
Russia Airplay (TopHit)	77
US Hot R&B/Hip-Hop Songs (Billboard)	61

== Certifications ==
Region	Certification	Certified units/sales
Brazil (Pro-Música Brasil)	Platinum	60,000^{‡}
Italy (FIMI)	Gold	15,000^{*}
New Zealand (RMNZ)	Gold	15,000^{‡}
United Kingdom (BPI)	Silver	200,000^{‡}
^{*} Sales figures based on certification alone.^{‡} Sales+streaming figures based on certification alone.

== Release history ==
=== Radio adds ===
Country	Date	Format
United States	September 7, 2010	Rhythmic
United States	2010	Urban

=== Purchaseable release ===
Country	Date	Format	Label
United States	September 14, 2010	Digital download	Def Jam
Canada	September 14, 2010	Digital download	Def Jam
Australia	September 14, 2010	Digital download	Def Jam
