= Infinito 2017 =

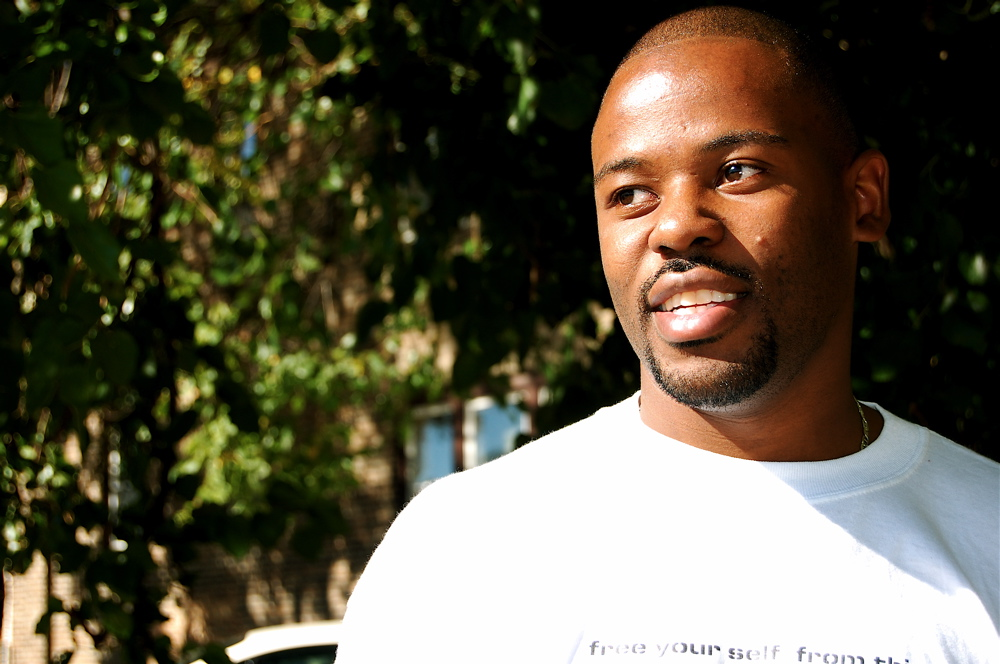
- Lovelace in 2007

Background information
- Also known as: Infinito
- Born: Marcellous Lovelace; October 26, 1975 (age 50)
- Origin: Chicago, Illinois, U.S.
- Genre: Hip hop
- Occupation: Rapper
- Years active: 1989–present
- Labels: Joe Left Hand Records; Nephew of Frank
- Website: www.infinito2017.com

Marcellous Lovelace (born October 26, 1975), better known by the stage name Infinito 2017, is an American hip hop musician. Alongside Thalone Davis and Cosmo Galactus, Infinito 2017 is a member of the Unorthodox Poets Society.

== Early life ==
Lovelace was born in Chicago, Illinois, to two parents employed by the United States military. As such, he traveled regularly as a child. He began creating music at age 13 with his cousin Dariel. He moved to Kentucky with his mother in the early 1990s. After Dariel died in 1994, Lovelace found comfort in hip hop music. Shortly thereafter he moved to Tennessee and began recording.

Lovelace graduated from the University of Memphis, receiving a bachelor's degree in Art and Communications, and later earning a Masters of Fine Arts.

== Career ==
While in college, Lovelace started performing on a regular basis at Fantasia hip-hop open mic nights. At this club he met Mr. Skurge, with whom he teamed up to form the Unorthodox Poets Society. Following Skruge's advice, Lovelace adopted Infinito as a stage name. By 1998, he moved back to Chicago and joined up with crews the Molemen and the Nacrobats. In 2002, Infinito 2017 was involved with Music with Sound Right Reasoning, released on Birthwrite Records and produced by Memo of the Molemen. He went on to study at the Art Institute of Chicago.

=== Infinito 2017 ===
In 2006, Infinito changed his name to Infinito 2017. In 2011 he released his 60th album under the Infinito 2017 name titled Pause Record Not For Sensitive Ears. In 2011, Infinito 2017 toured internationally as an independent artist.

== Discography ==
=== Albums ===
- vol. 843 (1998)
- year of the rabbit (1999)
- vintage rhymes EP (on vinyl) (1999)
- continuous (1999)
- amplitude modulation frequency sound (2000)
- timeless 1 got to rhyme full session (2000)
- all I do is make albums (2001)
- organizational behavior (2001)
- Qualified Professional 27 (Fatbeats) 12"inch (2002)
- Music With Sound Right Reasoning (2002)
- Roddny Dangrr Fild (2005)
- The Soul of Benjamin Banneker In the Age of Aquarius (2006)
- Most High Definition (2008)
- Divine Love (2009)
- Day Of The Night (2009)
- We Are Dark (2010)
- Classic Regulations (2010)
- Outer Body Experience 9.0: Thinking The Unthinkable (2010)
- Mics, RCA and Speaker wires (2011)
- Who Ever / We Gone Stay Up (7 inch) (2011)
- Pause Record Not for Sensitive Ears (2011)
- Try Again / Programmed Slaves (7 inch) (2011)
- Conquest of The More: Vol 1. Entrar en España (produced by Diox) (2012)
- Never Artificial / Not You (Who) (7 inch) (2012)
- Conquest of The More: Vol 2. Everything Changed (produced by The Geaux) (2012)
- A Tear For My People w/Colored Black (2012)
- Quality in Quantity (2012)
- Dope Fresh w/Dj Cosm of DFE (2013)
- Threatening Music X Brash and Abrasive (Masculine Music) (2014)
- Single Consciousness My Independent Mine (2014)
- Reading My Book Parts Hue (2015)
- AntiEverything (Tape also) (2015)
- Reality Distorted Call It Anything (2015)
- The Depth of Field Type Revolt (2015)
- From The Paths I Travel (2015)
- Children Have Room To Grow w/PLEASETHANKYOUKNOW (2015)
- An Enigma The Anti Social Introvert (2015)
- I MELANIN DARK SKIN (2016)
- Not Parts Of Your Watu (10" vinyl EP) (2016)
- EDUCATE MINDLESS BLIND DEAF DUMB (Black Vinyl E.P.) (2016)
- Looking For A Place Called Home /iLLsugi (2016)
- It's No Such Thing As a Good Colonial Oppressor (2017)
- A Protagonist Life: Unscrambling Africa (2017)
- Indigenous Unification Inside the Endless Nothing (2017)
- Sample Uncleared On They Unintelligent Stolen Property (2017)
- Freedom Purpose Thought (2017)
- Mind of Advanced Resistance (2017)
- Decided Parts in A Movie of Subtitles (2017)
- Don't Have Time To Take To Much Time (2017)
- The Children Are Only An Expression of Their Development (2017)
- Praying With My Feet (2017)
- African Of Kenya Ether Part 18 (2017)
- From Inside Self Living to Please Me (Fixed With Tape) (2018)
- Prolific Hits Vol 3 (2019)
- She Said I talk Black Episodes of Ebony Sugarwalls (2019)
- Super Pro Black Life Minus Devils (2020)
- 75Dab Dont Bite Copy or Clone (2020)
- Revolutionary Black Music (2020)
- 7102 Pan African Paragraphs (Black and Blackest) (2020)
- Conscious Black Art (No Drugs) (2020)
- Overcoming the Nothing and the Ignorance of Virtual Reality (2021)
- Can You Please Use Your Own Mind (2021)
- Raygun81 Once Upon My Boundless Space Craft (2021)
- Searching Love Around Basic Plan It (2021)
- Cancel Colonialism and its Oppressors They Tax 3/5$ Chattel (2021)
- No Mythology Lies or Folklore (2021)
- Mother Dear Inside Third Eye Heart (2022)
- Carefully Fed Daily Dosages of Self Awareness (2022)
- Disciplined Rainwater Endless Awareness Mathematical Model (2022)
- Rainwater Don't Drink (7inch) (2022)
- Unwilling To Drink Dirty Water (2023)
- Power Black Love (2023)
- Analog Bboy Boombap Definitions (2023)
- Mean Advanced Social Distance (2024)
- Liberation Escape Runaway Waiting For Eruption (2024)
- Black Fist Writers Dialog Rubber Trees (2024)
- Self Is His Only Reflection w/ML7102 (2024)
- The Future Tales of extrA fresh South Side Abstractions w/Fatnice (2024)
- Conscious Positive Loving Sonically (2024)
- 7102 PRO FADES SEVENFIVENINE (2024)
- when the sun dont love you back (2025)
- Their Black Under Water Part (Lesson 1) (2025)
- Their Black Under Water Part (Lesson 2) (2025)
- Dirty Digital Footprints Artificial Imitation (2025)
- What Yesterday Taught Me Let Go Today (2025)
- 7102 Profades African Hair Styles From Southside Chicago (2025)

=== Singles and EPs ===
- Vintage Rhymes EP (1999)
- "Dance Little Dreamer" (2001)
- "Funky Nassau" (2001)
