= Chuck Harmony =

American singer-songwriter

- Birth name: Charles T. Harmon
- Born: December 18, 1979 (age 45); East St. Louis, IL
- Genres: Pop; R&B; soul
- Occupations: Record producer; songwriter; arranger; sound engineer
- Instruments: Piano; guitar; drums
- Years active: 2006–present
- Labels: Kobalt Music Publishing; Weirdo Workshop

Charles T. Harmon (born December 18, 1979), known professionally as Chuck Harmony, is an American record producer and songwriter from Nashville, Tennessee. He is a three-time Grammy Award nominee, and won an NAACP Image Award for Outstanding Song for his contributions to Fantasia's 2010 single "Bittersweet".

== Early life ==
Harmon was born and raised in East St. Louis, Illinois. He grew up performing in church. At age 4, he learned to play the drums, which quickly led to Harmon playing the trombone, tuba, piano, in addition to singing in the church choir. He studied music at Alabama State University, where he took piano lessons with the goal of becoming a jazz pianist. After college, he relocated to Atlanta, Georgia.

== Career ==
=== Songwriting and producing (2007-present) ===
Harmon's first major songwriting credit was as a co-writer alongside Ne-Yo on Celine Dion's "I Got Nothin' Left" from her 2007 album Taking Chances. He has since earned production, composition, songwriting and instrumentation credits on songs by artists including Ne-Yo, Toni Braxton, Mary J. Blige, Jennifer Hudson, Janet Jackson, John Legend, Rihanna, Kelly Rowland, Anthony Hamilton, Johnny Gill, Keyshia Cole, Keri Hilson, K'naan, Bono and Corinne Bailey Rae.

Harmony was nominated for a 2009 Grammy Award for Album of the Year for co-producing Ne-Yo's Year of the Gentleman; for Best R&B Song at the 2011 Grammy Awards for co-writing Fantasia’s "Bittersweet"; and for Best R&B Song at the 2012 Grammy Awards for co-writing Ledisi's "Pieces of Me". He won a 2011 NAACP Image Award for Outstanding Song for "Bittersweet". He produced "Work in Progress (Growing Pains)" on Mary J. Blige's album Growing Pains, which won the 2009 Grammy Award for Best Contemporary R&B Album. He and Ne-Yo wrote and produced Rihanna's "Russian Roulette", the lead single from her 2009 album Rated R. He produced the single "One in a Million" from Ne-Yo's 2010 album Libra Scale, and produced and co-wrote Keri Hilson's 2010 single "Pretty Girl Rock".

=== Louis York (2015-present) ===
Harmony and Claude Kelly met while working on R&B singer Chrisette Michele's 2009 album Epiphany. They went on to write and produce together for artists including Bruno Mars, Miley Cyrus, Britney Spears, Jessie J, Faith Evans, Ledisi and Fantasia.

In 2015, Harmony and Kelly formed the progressive band Louis York. Their debut EP, Masterpiece Theater – Act I, was released in 2015. Harmony plays keyboards, guitars, drums and the vocoder on the album. The follow-up, Masterpiece Theater – Act II, was released in 2016, following the EP's lead single "Don't Play". Louis York is the first act on their artist collective and record label Weirdo Workshop, which is distributed by Sony-owned RED Distribution.

== Awards ==
Year	Award	Category	Work	Result
2009	Grammy Award	Album of the Year	Year of the Gentleman by Ne-Yo	Nominated
2011	Grammy Award	Best R&B Song	"Bittersweet" by Fantasia	Nominated
2011	NAACP Image Award	Outstanding Song	"Bittersweet" by Fantasia	Won
2012	Grammy Award	Best R&B Song	"Pieces of Me" by Ledisi	Nominated

== Discography ==
=== Louis York ===
Title	Album details
Masterpiece Theater – Act I	Released: September 18, 2015; Formats: Digital download; Label: Weirdo Workshop
Masterpiece Theater – Act II	Released: November 18, 2016; Formats: Digital download; Label: Weirdo Workshop
