= Champagne Life =

2010 single by Ne-Yo

Single by Ne-Yo

from the album Libra Scale
- Released: June 15, 2010
- Recorded: 2010
- Genre: R&B
- Length: 5:24
- Label: Def Jam
- Songwriter: Shaffer Smith
- Producer: D. DoRohn Gough

Ne-Yo singles chronology
"Beautiful Monster" (2010)	"Champagne Life" (2010)	"One in a Million" (2010)

"Champagne Life" is the second single from American singer Ne-Yo's fourth studio album, Libra Scale (2010). The song premiered on radio on June 5, 2010, and was released ten days later, through Def Jam Recordings. It was written by Ne-Yo and produced by D. DoRohn Gough.

== Background ==
The song's producer D. DoRohn Gough said about working with Ne-Yo on the song: "My desire is to influence a culture with music that feels good. I am honored that Ne-Yo is allowing me to display this music on a global stage.".

== Music video ==
The video premiered on July 14, 2010 along with the video for "Beautiful Monster". The video shows Ne-Yo to be a part of a crime fighting group that's living the life with money, women and fame. Narratively, it is the first of a thematic trilogy of music videos, followed by the videos for "One in a Million" and "Beautiful Monster".

Directed by Wayne Isham and Ne-Yo

== Remix ==
An unofficial remix was released with Fabolous & Rick Ross.

== Critical reception ==
Rap-Up magazine said that "Ne-Yo pops the cork and toasts to the good life on 'Champagne Life'". [He] evokes his idol Michael Jackson on the slinky production, which goes down smoothly". Mark Edward Nero from About.com praised the song, saying that it's "a Michael Jackson-esque tune about enjoying the type of life where "trouble is a bubble in a champagne glass" and "dreams and reality are one and the same". He also said that the song is catchier than "Beautiful Monster".

== Live performances ==
Ne-Yo performed "Champagne Life" at Power 106's Powerhouse 2010 concert at the Honda Center in Anaheim, California, on June 19, 2010.

== Charts ==
=== Weekly charts ===
Chart (2010–2011)	Peak position
Belgium (Ultratip Bubbling Under Wallonia)	11
Japan Hot 100 (Billboard)	35
US Adult R&B Songs (Billboard)	8
US Billboard Hot 100	75
US Hot R&B/Hip-Hop Songs (Billboard)	11
US Rhythmic Airplay (Billboard)	31

=== Year-end ===
Chart (2010)	Position
Japan Adult Contemporary (Billboard)	55
US Adult R&B Songs (Billboard)	25
Chart (2011)	Position
US Hot R&B/Hip-Hop Songs (Billboard)	100

== Radio and release information ==
=== Radio adds ===
Country	Date	Format
United States	June 15, 2010	Urban
United States	July 20, 2010	Rhythmic

=== Purchaseable release ===
Country	Date	Format	Label
United States	July 20, 2010	Digital download	Def Jam
Canada	July 20, 2010	Digital download	Def Jam
