= Verse Simmonds =

American rapper

- Born: Maurice Simmonds; Puerto Rico
- Genres: R&B; hip-hop
- Occupations: Singer; rapper; songwriter; record producer; record executive
- Years active: 2009–present
- Labels: Simmonds & Company, Inc.; KonLive; Def Jam; Interscope; Tha Alumini Music Group; Bu Vision
- Website: www.versesimmonds.com

Maurice "Verse" Simmonds is a Virgin Islander singer, rapper, songwriter, record producer, and record executive. Based in Los Angeles and raised in the Virgin Islands, he moved to the United States after high school and formed the production duo the Jugganauts (with Shama "Sak Pase" Joseph) in the 1990s. The duo has since co-written and produced songs such as "Man Down" by Rihanna and "Who Gon Stop Me" by Kanye West and Jay-Z, both of which charted prominently on Billboard.

Simmonds began recording as a lead artist in 2007, and signed with Def Jam to release his 2011 single "Boo Thang" (featuring Kelly Rowland), which peaked at number 44 on the Billboard Hot R&B/Hip-Hop Songs chart. He has also released several full-length mixtapes, which contain guest appearances from Young Jeezy, Akon, Snoop Dogg, and Travis Porter. Under his birth name or as Verse Simmonds he has co-written several hit R&B songs, such as "Confident" by Justin Bieber and Chance the Rapper, and "New Flame" by Chris Brown, Usher and Rick Ross. The latter earned Simmonds his first Grammy Award nomination for Best R&B Song in 2015.

== Early life and music ==
Maurice Simmonds was born in Puerto Rico. Raised in the Virgin Islands, Simmonds spent his youth on the island of Saint Thomas. Introduced to music primarily through the radio, in high school he and several friends formed the musical group 2 Xtreme, performing at local venues and talent shows. He moved to Fort Lauderdale in Florida after graduating high school, where he continued to work on hip hop production and songwriting. In 1996 in Fort Lauderdale Simmonds met and befriended the producer and songwriter Shama Joseph, and together they formed the production duo the Jugganauts. The Jugganauts moved to Los Angeles, California in 2003 to work on a number of projects for major record labels. Several years later Simmonds was contacted by Theron Thomas, a childhood friend and member of the production duo Rock City. Thomas convinced the Jugganauts to move to Atlanta, Georgia, where they began recording with producers such as Rodney Jerkins and Akon.

== Music career ==
=== First solo releases (2009–2010) ===
External videos
- "Buy You A Round (Up And Down)" Official Music Video on VEVO (November 22, 2009)

After moving to Atlanta Simmonds began working more intently on his own solo material, both performing and recording original material around the city. In February 2007, he became associated as a solo artist with Cloud 9 and Raydar Management, and one of his live shows led to a contract with Interscope Records. Simmonds released his first solo track on Interscope on June 30, 2009. Titled "Buy You a Round (Up and Down)," AllMusic called it "a cocky, percussion-heavy club single" that "enabled the upcoming singer, songwriter, and occasional MC to tour extensively." "Buy You A Round (Up And Down)" peaked at No. 55 on the Billboard Hot R&B/Hip-Hop Songs chart and at No. 63 on the Hot R&B/Hip-Hop Airplay chart. An official music video for the track was uploaded to VEVO on November 22, 2009.

Simmonds released a mixtape in August 2009, titled The Sextape Chronicles. Sham and Simmonds served as executive producers, with Raydar, Cloud9, Darkchild, and DJ Trauma listed in the credits as presenters. In December 2009, a track with co-writing by Simmonds was included on the R. Kelly album Untitled. The album ultimately went on to be nominated for a Grammy Award. In 2010, a number of Simmonds' recent tracks were included in the free V The Compilation Vol. 2 mixtape, which was presented by DJ Ill Will.

=== "Boo Thang" and mixtapes (2011-2012) ===
He signed to Akon's Konvict Muzik as a singer-songwriter and producer in January 2011, also becoming associated with MVD Inc. and the Konlive imprint. Later in 2011 he signed to Bu Vision, a label run by Akon's brother Bu Thiam and affiliated with Def Jam and Konlive. Simmonds' August 2011 mixtape The Sextape Chronicles 2 was released through Bu Vision, Konlive, and Carteblanche, and listed hosts such as Angela Yee. In 2011 he worked as The Jugganauts with his production partner Sham on both writing and producing the reggae-infused song "Man Down" for Rihanna's album Loud. Also with Sham, he worked on "Who Gon Stop Me" by Kanye West and Jay-Z for the Watch the Throne album.

External videos
- "Boo Thang" Official Music Video on VEVO (October 10, 2011)
- Justin Bieber- "Confident "(Audio) ft. Chance The Rapper on VEVO (Dec 8, 2013) - features co-writing by Simmonds.

Through Bu Vision, in September 2011, Simmonds released his single "Boo Thang," featuring Kelly Rowland. As described by MTV, apart from Rowland's vocals, "Verse starts by rapping over a midtempo piano-laced track. His raps give way to a melodic refrain that he sings, leading him all the way to the hook." A music video directed by Gil Green and starring Rowlands and Simmonds was released to accompany the single. "Boo Thang" peaked at No. 66 on the Billboard Hot R&B/Hip-Hop Songs chart and at No. 44 on the Hot R&B/Hip-Hop Airplay chart. The song was ultimately included on Simmonds' mixtape Sextape Chronicles 2.

=== Mixtapes and EPs (2012–2013) ===
His April 2012 mixtape Sex Love & Hip Hop was hosted by DJ Drama, with other guest artists such as Yo Gotti, Kelly Rowland, Snoop Dogg and Akon. The third in his Sex Tape Chronicles series, Simmonds at the time called it his "biggest mixtape." In August 2012, he self-released A Sextape Chronicle, a six-track EP, and his October 2012 mixtape Fuck Your Feelings featured guest artists such as Red Cafe, Gucci Mane, and Young Jeezy. In late 2012, he contributed to studio sessions involving recording artist Omotola Jalade Ekeinde.

Simmonds' track "Fully Loaded," featuring Young Jeezy, came out on June 11, 2013, on BuVision, and also that year Simmonds released the "Who U Wit" with features from Trouble and Yo Gotti. Simmonds' mixtape Fuck Your Feelings 2 was released for free on June 12, 2013. His six track EP Circa 96: A Prelude to 1996 came out in August 2013 as a free mixtape. Drop FM gave it a score of 7/10 and a positive review, writing that Simmonds can "create a '90s-inspired project that still sounds fresh and modern." The review opined the fact that Simmonds "stayed true to the 1996 concept by using traditional R&B sounds and a throwback vocal delivery," and "made songs that should be able to keep the listeners' attention throughout." Also in 2013, Simmonds' collaborated with rapper Cap 1 on a mixtape titled Champagne Poets. Released in November 2013, it featured artists such as 2 Chainz and Travis Porter.

=== Recent releases (2013–2015) ===
In 2013, he participated as a writer on a number of collaborations, for example co-writing the Justin Bieber song "Confident", which featured Chance the Rapper and had hip hop and reggae elements. In 2013 and 2014, he co-wrote six songs on the Chris Brown album X, after taking part in a writing camp put on by RCA Records. One of the tracks, a promo single titled "Don't Think They Know", came out in late 2013 and peaked at No. 81 on the Billboard Hot 100. Other tracks he co-wrote on the album featured artists such as Jhené Aiko and Trey Songz, while "Love More" featured Nicki Minaj and reached No. 23 on the Hot 100 chart. The album's track "New Flame", which featured Usher and Rick Ross, went on to be nominated for Best R&B Song at the 57th Annual Grammy Awards in 2015.

External videos
- Verse Simmonds - "Situationships" Official Music Video on VEVO (June 17, 2015)

In February 2014 Simmonds self-released the single "Best Sex Eva" on his own Simmonds & Company imprint. Also in February 2014, a song he co-wrote titled "Private" was included on the T.I. album Paperwork. Simmonds then released his single "Situationships" on March 24, 2015. The track featured co-production from Needlz and Donut, and the publication Complex wrote that with the lyrics "Simmonds goes in on different types of relationships that go against the grain." The official music video for "Situationships" came out on VEVO on June 17, 2015.

His mixtape Fuck Your Feelings 3 was released on July 15, 2015. The publication Uproxx wrote that Fvck Your Feelings 3 "is how it's supposed to be done. Verse Simmonds mixes up a stiff drink and hits the club for a much needed remix to Drake and P... the remix cuts out the weakest link, keeps Drizzy and Future's hook on blast and features a mandatory explicit sixteen from Verse." Through the label VVS Society, in July 2015, Simmonds released two singles: "All I Want" featuring Jeremih, and "Luv In It" featuring Migos.

== Musical style and influences ==
Simmonds has self-identified his vocal stylings as "R&B, hip-hop, reggae and calypso," and he has also described the genre of his original music as "island B," for being "a mixture of R&B, a little bit of Caribbean flavor and hip hop." About his lyrics, among other topics he has stated that he finds women to be "inspiration" and relationships are a commons theme throughout his mixtapes.

== Awards and nominations ==
Year	Award	Nominated work	Category	Result
2011	Grammy; Awards	Untitled by R. Kelly (Simmonds as co-writer)	Best R&B Album	Nominated
2015	Grammy; Awards	"New Flame" by Chris Brown (Simmonds as co-writer)	Best R&B Song	Nominated
2027	Grammy; Awards	"Spend Dat" by Yung Miami (Simmonds as co-writer)	Best Rap Song	Nominated

== Discography ==
=== Mixtapes ===
Full-length mixtapes by Verse Simmonds
Year	Mixtape title	Release details
2009	The Sextape Chronicles	Released: August 2009; Label: Self-released
2010	V The Compilation Pt. 1	Released: December 2010; Label: Self-released
2010	V The Compilation Vol. 2	Released: 2010; Label: unknown
2011	Sex Tape Chronicles 2 (Rhythm and Streets Edition)	Released: July 2011; Label: BuVision, Konlive, Carteblanche
2012	Fuck Your Feelings	Released: October 5, 2012; Label: Self-released
2012	Sex, Love & Hip-Hop	Released: April 12, 2012; Label: Self-released
2013	Fuck Your Feelings 2	Released: June 12, 2013; Label: Self-released
2013	Champagne Poets (with Cap 1)	Released: November 11, 2013; Label: Self-released
2015	Fuck Your Feelings 3	Released: July 15, 2015; Label: Self-released

=== EPs ===
EPs by Verse Simmonds
Year	EP title	Release details
2012	A Sextape Chronicle	Released: August 16, 2012; Label: Verse Simmonds; Format: Digital download
2013	Circa '96	Released: January 10, 2013; Label: Self-released; Format: Digital download

=== Singles ===
Incomplete list of songs by Verse Simmonds
Year	Title	Chart peaks				Album	Release details
Year	Title	US Rap	US R&B	R&B Air	US Ring	Album	Release details
2009	"Buy You A Round (Up And Down)"	—	55	63	—	Single	Interscope (June 30, 2009)
2010	"I Dont Mind"	—	—	—	—	Single	CarteBlanche (December 3, 2010)
2011	"Boo Thang" (ft. Kelly Rowland)	—	66	44	15	Single	The Island/Def Jam (September 13, 2011)
2012	"Keep It 100" (ft. Akon)	—	—	—	—	Sex, Love & Hip-Hop	Self-released (April 12, 2012)
2012	"Bad Mutha" (ft. Snoop Dogg)	—	112	—	—	Sex, Love & Hip-Hop	Self-released (April 12, 2012)
2013	"Who U Wit" (ft. Yo Gotti, Trouble)	—	—	—	—	Street Runnaz 73	
2013	"Fully Loaded" (ft. Young Jeezy)	—	—	—	—	Single	BuVision (June 11, 2013)
2014	"Best Sex Eva"	—	—	—	—	Single	Simmonds & Company, Inc. (February 18, 2014)
2015	"Situationships"	—	—	—	—	Single	Simmonds & Company, Inc. (March 24, 2015)
2015	"All I Want" (feat. Jeremih)	—	—	—	—	Fuck Your Feelings 3	VVS Society (July 2, 2015)
2015	"Luv In It" (ft. Migos)	—	—	—	—	Single	VVS Society (July 15, 2015)
"—" denotes a recording that did not chart or was not released in that territory.

=== Guest credits ===
Selected vocal and production credits for Verse Simmonds
Year	Title	Artist	Chart peaks								Album	Role
Year	Title	Artist	US 100	Top 40	US R&B	R&B Air	Pop 100	US Rap	UK	US Chr.	Album	Role
2009	"Crazy Night" (ft. Rock City)	R. Kelly	—	—	—	—	—	—	—	—	Untitled	Co-writer
2010	"Nothing Like Me" (ft. Verse Simmonds)	Juvenile	—	—	—	—	—	—	—	—	Beast Mode	Featured artist
2010	"I Got Juice" (ft. Verse Simmonds)	OJ Da Juiceman	—	—	—	—	—	—	—	—	Single	Featured artist
2011	"Handz Up (Work)" (ft. Verse Simmonds)	Gator Boyz	—	—	—	—	—	—	—	—	Single	Featured artist
2011	"Who Gon Stop Me"	Kanye West and Jay-Z	44	—	—	—	—	—	—	—	Watch the Throne	Co-writer
2012	"American Woman" (ft. Verse Simmonds)	Diamond	—	—	—	—	—	—	—	—	The Young Life	Featured artist
2012	Unknown tracks	DJ Drama	—	—	—	—	—	—	—	—	Quality Street Music	Background vocals
2012	"Put It Down" (ft. Verse Simmonds)	Richie Wess	—	—	—	—	—	—	—	—	Single	Featured artist
2012	"Wish You Would" (ft. Verse Simmonds)	Gucci Mane	—	—	—	—	—	—	—	—	I'm Up	Featured artist
2013	"Confident" (ft. Chance the Rapper)	Justin Bieber	41	—	13	—	—	—	33	—	Journals	Co-writer
2013	"Water World" (ft. Verse Simmonds and Lil Jug)	Mesha Milan	—	—	—	—	—	—	—	—	Single	Featured artist
2013	"Ice Cold" (ft. Verse Simmonds)	Gucci Mane	—	—	—	—	—	—	—	—	The State vs. Radric; Davis II	Featured artist
2013	"Came from Nothin" (feat. Gunplay, Kevin Gates & Verse Simmonds)	DJ Spinatik	—	—	—	—	—	—	—	—	Single	Featured artist
2013	"You Gon Love Me" (ft. Verse Simmonds)	Gucci Mane	—	—	—	—	—	—	—	—	Trap God 2	Featured artist
2013	"Fvcks With U" (ft. Verse Simmonds)	Genius	—	—	—	—	—	—	—	—	Single	Featured artist
2013	"Don't Think They Know"	Chris Brown	81	—	29	—	—	—	95	—	X	Co-writer
2014	"New Flame" (ft. Usher and Rick Ross)	Chris Brown	27	29	6	1	—	—	10	—	X	Co-writer
2014	"Songs on 12 Play" (ft. Trey Songz)	Chris Brown	—	—	—	—	—	—	—	—	X	Co-writer
2014	"Body Shots"	Chris Brown	—	—	—	—	—	—	—	—	X	Co-writer
2014	"Drunk Texting" (ft. Jhené Aiko)	Chris Brown	—	—	—	—	—	—	—	—	X	Co-writer
2014	"Love More" (ft. Nicki Minaj)	Chris Brown	23	39	7	—	—	—	32	—	X	Co-writer
2014	"Private Show" (ft. Chris Brown)	T.I.	—	—	42	14	—	—	—	—	Paperwork	Composer
2014	"5ive" (ft. Verse Simmonds, K. Camp, Que)	Genius	—	—	—	—	—	—	—	—	Single	Featured artist
2014	"Hard To Do"	K. Michelle	—	—	—	—	—	—	—	—	Anybody Wanna; Buy a Heart?	Co-writer
2014	"Gone on That Liquor" (ft. Verse Simmonds and Frank Lini)	Hands Up Music	—	—	—	—	—	—	—	—	Single	Featured artist
2014	"Tips" (ft. Verse Simmonds and Chizzy B McFlyy)	Mic Lawry	—	—	—	—	—	—	—	—	Single	Featured artist
2014	"Ain't My Fault" (ft. Verse Simmonds and Yung Berg)	Yesi Ortiz	—	—	—	—	—	—	—	—	Single	Featured artist
2015	"On To You (Remix)" (ft.Kranium, Kreesha Turner, Verse Simmonds)	Marley Waters	—	—	—	—	—	—	—	—	Single	Featured artist
2015	"Diamonds and Gold" (ft. Verse Simmonds)	Kid Ink	—	—	—	—	—	—	—	—	Full Speed	Featured artist, co-writer
2015	"Hotel" (ft. Chris Brown)	Kid Ink	96	—	30	—	—	—	43	—	Full Speed	Co-writer
2015	"Permission"	Ro James				1					Eldorado	Co-writer
2015	"Top Down"	Fifth Harmony	—	—	—	—	—	—	—	—	Reflection	Co-writer
2018	"Preach"	Lecrae and Zaytoven	—	—	—	—	—	—	—	40	Let the Trap Say Amen	Co-writer
2018	"Only God Can Judge Me"	Lecrae and Zaytoven	—	—	—	—	—	—	—	44	Let the Trap Say Amen	Co-writer
2018	"By Chance"	Lecrae and Zaytoven featuring Verse Simmonds	—	—	—	—	—	—	—	—	Let the Trap Say Amen	Featured artist, co-writer
2018	"Savior"	Iggy Azalea featuring Quavo	—	—	—	—	—	—	—	—	TBA	Co-writer
2018	"—" denotes a recording that did not chart or was not released in that territory.											

== Videography ==
Incomplete list of music videos featuring Verse Simmonds
Title	Yr	Director(s)/producer(s)	Primary artist(s)	Outlet
"Buy You A Round"	2009	Interscope	Verse Simmonds	VEVO (November 22, 2009)
"Boo Thang"	2011	Gil Green	Verse Simmonds feat. Kelly Rowland	VEVO (October 10, 2011)
"Fully Loaded"	2014	Phil The God	Verse Simmonds	VEVO (January 15, 2014)
"Best Sex Eva"	2014	Jamal Samuels	Verse Simmonds	VEVO (February 20, 2014)
"Situationships"	2015	The Spice Group	Verse Simmonds	VEVO (June 17, 2015)
"Strip Tease"	2015	LPMG Films	Verse Simmonds	VEVO (July 1, 2015)

== See also ==
- List of hip hop musicians
- Hip hop of the Virgin Islands
