= Boo Thang =

Single by Verse Simmonds featuring Kelly Rowland

from the album Sextape Chronicles 2
- Released: September 13, 2011
- Recorded: 2011
- Genre: Hip hop; R&B
- Length: 4:31
- Label: Bu Vision; Konvict; Def Jam
- Songwriters: Shama E. "Sak Pase" Joseph; Maurice Simmonds; Ashlee Chanel Ross
- Producer: Joseph

Verse Simmonds singles chronology
"I Dont Mind" (2010)	"Boo Thang" (2011)	"Keep It 100" (2012)

Kelly Rowland singles chronology
"Lay It on Me" (2011)	"Boo Thang" (2011)	"Down for Whatever" (2011)

"Boo Thang" is a song by American rapper Verse Simmonds, featuring singer Kelly Rowland. It was released by Bu Vision, a label run by Akon's brother Bu Thiam, in association with Konvict Muzik and Def Jam Recordings. "Boo Thang" peaked at No. 44 on both the Billboard Hot R&B/Hip-Hop Songs chart and the Hot R&B/Hip-Hop Airplay chart. The song was ultimately included on Simmonds' mixtape Sextape Chronicles 2.

== Music video ==
A music video, directed by Gil Green, was released to accompany the single. Filmed in Santa Clarita, California, it features appearances by Rowland, Verse’s fellow Konvict Muzik member Akon, and stand-up comedian Lil Duval.

== Charts ==
Chart performance for "Boo Thang"
Chart (2011)	Peak position
US Hot R&B/Hip-Hop Songs (Billboard)	44
US R&B/Hip-Hop Airplay (Billboard)	44

== Release history ==
Release history and formats for "Boo Thang"
Region	Date	Format	Label
United States	September 13, 2011	Digital download	Island Def Jam
