= Who Gon Stop Me =

Song by Jay-Z and Kanye West

from the album Watch the Throne
- Released: August 8, 2011
- Studio: (The Mercer) Hotel (New York)
- Genre: Experimental; dubstep; grime
- Length: 4:17
- Label: Roc-A-Fella; Roc Nation; Def Jam
- Songwriters: Kanye West; Shawn Carter; Shama Joseph; Mike Dean; Maurice Simmonds; Joshua Kierkegaard
- Producers: Sham "Sak Pase" Joseph; Kanye West

"Who Gon Stop Me" is a song by American rappers Jay-Z and Kanye West from their collaborative studio album, Watch the Throne (2011). The song features additional vocals from Mr Hudson, Swizz Beatz, and Verse Simmonds. It was produced by Sham "Sak Pase" Joseph and West with additional production from Mike Dean; the producers served as co-writers with Jay-Z, Simmonds, and Flux Pavilion. The song's concept came from Simmonds and Joseph, the former of whom followed Jay-Z and West's mindset to write the hook.

An experimental track that combines dubstep and grime with rap music, "Who Gon Stop Me" prominently samples Flux Pavilion's "I Can't Stop". Lyrically, the song sees West expressing his determination to live a lifestyle of extravaganza and Jay-Z honoring his success from their positions as African Americans. The song received moderately positive reviews from music critics, who mostly highlighted West's performance. Some praised its dubstep sound, while critics were more lukewarm towards Jay-Z's performance and were mixed towards his lyricism.

The song reached numbers 44 and 60 on the US Billboard Hot 100 and Canadian Hot 100, respectively. It received a gold certification in the United States from the Recording Industry Association of America. Jay-Z and West performed "Who Gon Stop Me" live on their Watch the Throne Tour (2011–2012), later beginning their set with the song at Samsung Galaxy's South by Southwest concert in 2014. It is featured in Baz Luhrmann's historical romance drama film The Great Gatsby (2013), an adaptation of the 1925 novel of the same name.

== Background and conception ==
Before collaborating on the Watch the Throne project, Jay-Z and West worked together on such singles as "Swagga Like Us" (2008), "Run This Town" (2009), and "Monster" (2010). In July 2011, Puerto Rican rapper Verse Simmonds said that he started working with his production partner Sham "Sak Pase" Joseph immediately on Watch the Throne after being recruited by Def Jam's artists and repertoire Vice President Bu Thiam. The duo dedicated a week to recording, taking influence from British electronic dance music, and Simmonds specifically seeking dubstep material while maintaining a hip-hop feel. Simmonds and Joseph came up with the song's lyrical concept, placing himself in the mindset of Jay-Z and West to pen the hook and apparently being compared to the rap duo when he recorded a reference track. Himself and Joseph found their chemistry in the studio where they did not feel under pressure brainstorming ideas in an atmosphere of "brotherly friendship". Simmonds contributed additional vocals along with Mr Hudson and Swizz Beatz.

"Who Gon Stop Me" was produced by Joseph with West, while Mike Dean contributed additional production. The producers co-wrote the song with Jay-Z, Simmonds, and English dubstep producer Flux Pavilion (the latter wrote the song "I Can't Stop" which is prominently sampled in "Who Gon Stop Me". In March 2012, Flux Pavilion told HipHopDX that it was "absolutely magical" to be recognized outside of his genre, particularly by artists of Jay-Z and West's fame, and choosing it as one of his favourite recordings despite his lingering doubts about the song's quality. The producer appreciated "Who Gon Stop Me" for differentiating from his original recording and believed it would not be Jay-Z and West's track if they had rapped only over his beat.

== Composition and lyrics ==
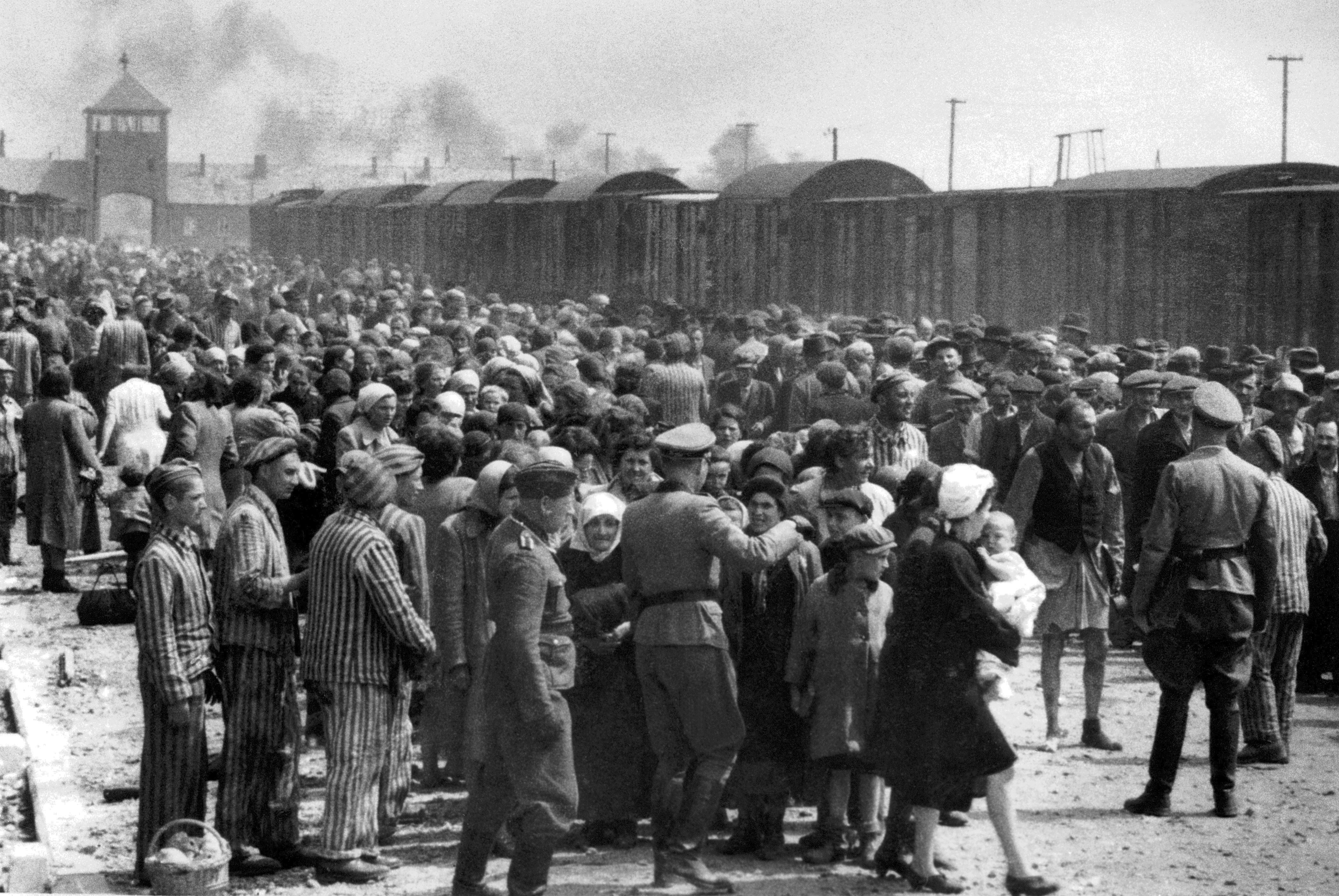
On the song's hook, West compares the victims to struggles across American history to those lost during the Holocaust.

"Who Gon Stop Me" has been characterized as an experimental track that combines dubstep and grime with rap music. The song builds around on a sample of Flux Pavilion's "I Can't Stop", incorporating its beat drop into West's chorus and using its synths. West takes up the first part of the track, rapping a chorus in a distorted into a growl while he mutters on the chorus tinny growl over a heavy bassline. During its coda, the song abandons the bass and switches to sirens and liquified synths, as Jay-Z raps for the last two minutes while taking brief pauses and speeding up his pace.

In the lyrics of "Who Gon Stop Me", West expresses determination to live a highly extravagant lifestyle after having managed to inspire black youths looking for success. On the hook, West compares the victims of inner-city violence, slavery, and poverty throughout American history to the Holocaust victims; saying that in both cases "millions of people lost". He also addresses struggles throughout the past by rapping "Til I die/ I'mma fuckin ball". Jay-Z honors his own success in the face of African American oppression, believing that he could achieve this again if he had to restart. He raps about his criminal past and shows a "middle finger" to his former life, congratulating himself on graduating "from the corner" despite not having a diploma.

== Release and reception ==
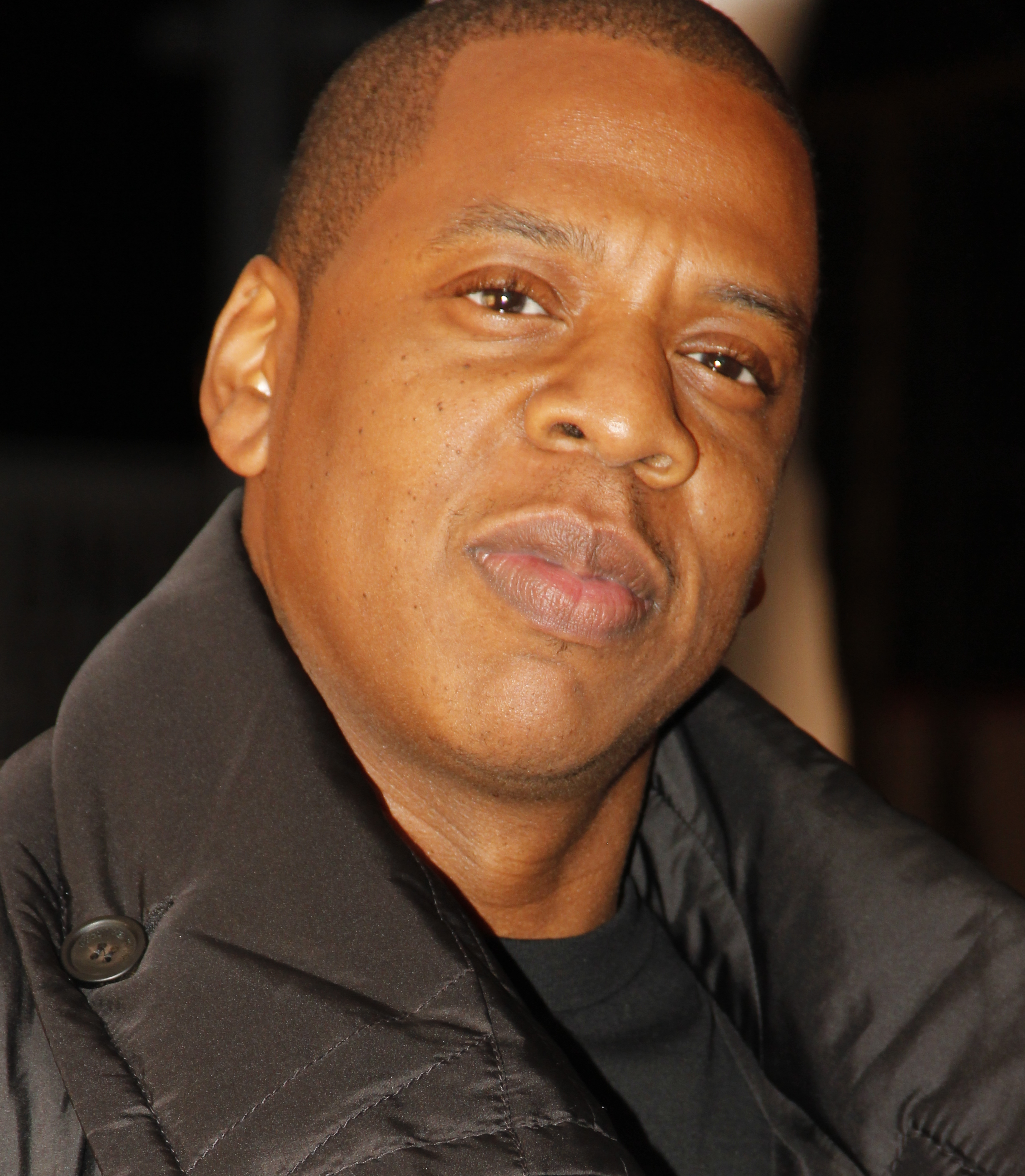
Reviewers were lukewarm towards Jay-Z's verse, with some praising his focus on the past and others not finding his lyrics to be suitable for the song.

On August 8, 2011, "Who Gon Stop Me" was included as the ninth track on Jay-Z and West's collaborative studio album Watch The Throne, released by their record labels Def Jam, Roc Nation, and Roc-A-Fella. The song was met with lukewarm reviews from music critics, generally praising West's performance, but feeling underwhelmed by Jay-Z vocal delivery and rhymes. Writing for Rolling Stone, Matthew Perpetua felt the song showcases West's vocal talent that is "processed into a [...] growl" and Jay-Z delivers a worthy performance too. Erika Ramirez of Billboard described "Who Gon Stop Me" as an ideal song "for wildin'", expressing that Jay-Z and West give "the middle finger" to their haters and past struggles. Randall Roberts from the Los Angeles Times commented that the song's title echoes the words of kings and despots throughout time as they gain power, showing the rappers as "more nimble and disciplined" than rulers who died such as King Henry VIII. Andy Gill from The Independent picked the song as one from the album to download, although he considered the theme of black-on-black violence to receive "less empathy" than on "Murder to Excellence" as Jay-Z raps about graduating from the corner with no diploma and indicates "disdain for those less able to effect that manoeuvre".

Critics, for the most part, felt that the dubstep sample enhances the track, elegantly creating a viable subgenre out of dubstep-rap and adding "a tangible menace". However, several publications did not like the stylistic divergence from the rest of the album and an example of what Jay-Z had "made a career steering clear of". Tiny Mix Tapes' Ross Green noted that West's "metallic, frequency-distorted chorus" appears atop the drop from "I Can't Stop" and becomes "the most unexpected grime banger of all time", until the beat switch where Jay-Z uncontrollably delivers "aimless rhymes" with too many pauses of breathing and he felt the album would be improved if this second half was removed. Focusing on Jay-Z's performance for Spin, Rob Harvilla called the song a determined attempt to hide his narcissism as he tries to impress by mentioning famous painters, providing an "equally goofy but no less effective rise-of-the-machines dystopian squall" that is still stronger than the rapper's 2006 song "Beach Chair". Slant Magazine's Matthew Cole stated that it would be generous to consider the song's "ham-fisted rabble-rousing" merely as bad as rapper Mos Def's worst material with criticism for West's performance, although he believed fellow album track "Made In America" to be worse.

Following the release of Watch the Throne, "Who Gon Stop Me" charted at number 44 on the Billboard Hot 100, without being released as a single. It was the only track from the album not released as a single to chart on the Hot 100, which resulted out of download numbers alone. The track debuted at number 19 on the US Digital Songs chart, standing behind Drake's "Headlines" as the second highest debut of the week and it debuted at number six on the component R&B/Hip-Hop Digital Song Sales chart. On March 16, 2013, the track entered the US Hot R&B Songs chart at number 21. In April 2015, "Who Gon Stop Me" was certified gold by the Recording Industry Association of America for pushing 500,000 certified units in the United States. It was also the album's only non-single to chart in Canada, debuting at number 60 on the Canadian Hot 100.

== Live performances and appearances in media ==
The song was performed by Jay-Z and West throughout their Watch the Throne Tour that ran from 2011 until 2012. During the opening concert at Philips Arena in Atlanta on October 28, 2011, Jay-Z finished its lyrics a capella due to technical issue with the music's timing. Jay-Z was joined by West to perform the song for Jay-Z's set at BBC Radio 1's Hackney Weekend on June 23, 2012, and at the start of Samsung Galaxy's South by Southwest concert at the Austin Music Hall in Austin, Texas on March 12, 2014. At the latter show, they appeared atop large metal boxes, which showed a video of a shark on their screens, accompanied by red lasers amidst smoke. The rappers were accompanied by a 12-foot video cube at the center of the stage as they appeared atop large metal boxes, which showed a video of a shark on their screens.

It was used in Baz Luhrmann's film The Great Gatsby (2013) that is an adaption of F. Scott Fitzgerald's 1925 novel of the same name, appearing in the party scene in a Jazz Age Manhattan hotel room. In 2014, Complex listed "Who Gon Stop Me" among their 25 pregame jams for players from the National Basketball Association for its aspirational inspiration.

== Credits and personnel ==
Credits are adapted from the album's liner notes.

Recording

- Recorded and mixed at (The Mercer) Hotel (New York)

Personnel

- Kanye West – songwriter, production
- Jay-Z – songwriter
- Sham "Sak Pase" Joseph – songwriter, production
- Mike Dean – songwriter, additional production
- Verse Simmonds – songwriter, additional vocals
- Joshua Kierkegaard – songwriter
- Noah Goldstein – recording engineer
- Anthony Kilhoffer – mix engineer
- Mr Hudson – additional vocals
- Swizz Beatz – additional vocals

== Charts ==
Chart performance
Chart (2011–13)	Peak position
Canada Hot 100 (Billboard)	60
US Billboard Hot 100	44
US R&B/Hip-Hop Digital Song Sales (Billboard)	6
US Hot R&B Songs (Billboard)	21

== Certifications ==
Certifications
Region	Certification	Certified units/sales
United States (RIAA)	Platinum	1,000,000^{‡}
^{‡} Sales+streaming figures based on certification alone.
