= It's Yours =

It's Yours may refer to:

- "It's Yours" (J. Holiday song)
- "It's Yours" (Tamia song)
- "It's Yours", a song by Jon Cutler
- "It's Yours", a song by Kyle from the album Light of Mine
