= Leave It Smokin' =

- The Kemist remix single cover

Single by Tamia

from the album Passion Like Fire
- Released: April 27, 2018
- Length: 3:55
- Label: Plus 1; 21; eOne
- Songwriters: Salaam Remi; Alicia Renee Williams; Tamia Hill
- Producer: Salaam Remi

Tamia singles chronology
"Love Falls Over Me" (2015)	"Leave It Smokin'" (2018)	"Today I Do" (2018)

"Leave It Smokin'" is a song by Canadian singer Tamia. Inspired by New York summertime music, Tamia wrote the song alongside frequent collaborators Alicia Renee Williams and Salaam Remi for her seventh studio album Passion Like Fire (2018); its production was handled by Remi. A throw-back to 1990s music, the uptempo R&B song exhibits elements of 1990s funk, soul, and dance music. Built on a stoic, snare-heavy retro break beat and a smooth, rhythmic groove, the song's instrumentation includes moody synthesizers, keyboard tones, and drums. Lyrically, "Leave It Smokin'" finds the singer looking for passions in her lover to fuel her needs.

The song was acclaimed by contemporary music critics, who praised its retro vibe, as well as the production handled by Remi and Tamia's gentle vocals. It appeared on several year-end lists. Released as the album's lead single on April 27, 2018, it became her biggest hit single in years. "Leave It Smokin'" peaked at number two on the US Adult R&B Songs chart in July 2018, finishing fourth on the chart's year-end listing, while also reaching the top 20 of the US R&B/Hip-Hop Airplay chart. Tamia performed the song at the 2018 award ceremony of Black Girls Rock!. The song was part of her set list for her Passion Like Fire Tour (2018–19).

== Recording ==
"Leave It Smokin'" was written by Tamia along with Alicia Renee Williams and Salaam Remi, both of which had previously collaborated with the singer on her previous albums Beautiful Surprise (2012) and Love Life (2015). Built upon a key pass that Remi provided "on the B50 of a melody and a snare," it was written over a stripped "New York summertime" instrumentation that Remi heavily polished late into the production of the song. Recording of the song took place at the Remi's studios in Miami, Florida, while mixing was overseen by Gary Noble at The Instrument Zoo Studios. Tamia later commented on the creation process: "[Remi] has this process of taking a song and sitting with it as long as he needs to in order to make it feel right. It sounded good when I left it but when I picked it up, it was great. It definitely has a feel, that good retro but still current vibe."

== Release and reception ==
"Leave It Smokin'" received favorable reviews from music critics who complimented the song for its "retro R&B sound" which they considered reminiscent of early 1990s dance music. SoulinStereo called the song "easily the album standout" and wrote: "It's as sultry as it's catchy – a playfully infectious mid-tempo groove that immediately seduces your ears. When it comes to summer songs for lovers, this is "Boo'd Up" for grown folks." Los Angeles Times writer Gerrick D. Kennedy described "Leave It Smokin'" as a "seductive neo-soul throwback," while Elias Light from Rolling Stone remarked that it "employs a serviceable Soul II Soul-like shuffle." Billboard ranked the song seventh on its 20 Best R&B Songs of 2018 listing, with BBC Radio and other magazines such as Spin and SoulTracks also including it on their year-end lists. Actor Bill Nighy included the song in his café playlist, released to The Guardian in January 2020.

The song was released on April 27, 2018 through iTunes and other digital streaming platforms. When asked about her decision to select it as the lead single from Passion Like Fire, Tamia elaborated: "Every time I work with Salaam Remi, I leave thinking I have a great record, and then he sits with it for three weeks and makes a thousand edits and just lives with it [...] I just felt such a connection with the song. It just felt fun like summertime, like a good way to introduce the album [...] I think it's important to show ebbs and flows for an album, and I just love this song." On August 17, 2018, Plus One Music Group and eOne Music released a remix version of the song which features additional vocals from rapper Wale. It received mixed reviews from critics.

== Chart performance ==
"Leave It Smokin'" debuted at number 28 on the US Adult R&B Songs in the week ending May 12, becoming Tamia's first entry on the list since "Stuck with Me" (2015). For the week ending June 8, 2018, the song reached number 10 on chart, becoming her twelfth top ten entry as well as her first top 10 hit on the Adult R&B Songs chart since "Beautiful Surprise" peaked at number four of 2012. "Leave It Smokin'" eventually peaked at number two. On Billboard's R&B/Hip-Hop Airplay chart, the song reached number 16, becoming her most successful single since "Stranger in My House".

== Music video ==
The music video for "Leave It Smokin'" was directed by Canadian filmmaker Aaron A. It was shot in Toronto and premiered on YouTube on June 15, 2018.

== Track listing ==
Digital single
No.	Title	Producer(s)	Length
1.	"Leave It Smokin'"	Remi	3:54

Remix single
No.	Title	Producer(s)	Length
1.	"Leave It Smokin'" (Remix featuring Wale)	Remix	4:10

Remix single
No.	Title	Producer(s)	Length
1.	"Leave It Smokin'" (remixed by Moon Boots)	Remi; Moon Boots^{[a]}	5:06

Remix single
No.	Title	Producer(s)	Length
1.	"Leave It Smokin'" (The Kemist Remix)	Remi; The Kemist^{[a]}	3:29

Notes

- ^{^[a]} denotes additional producer

== Credits and personnel ==
Credits adapted from the liner notes of Passion Like Fire.

- Alicia Renee Williams – writer
- Chris Gehringer – mastering
- Tamia Hill – writer
- Gary Noble – mixing
- Salaam Remi – production, recording, writer

== Charts ==
=== Weekly charts ===
Weekly chart performance for "Leave It Smokin'"
Chart (2018)	Peak position
US R&B/Hip-Hop Airplay (Billboard)	16

=== Year-end charts ===
Year-end chart performance for "Leave It Smokin'"
Chart (2018)	Position
US Adult R&B Songs (Billboard)	4

== Release history ==
Release history for "Leave It Smokin'"
Region	Date	Format	Label	Ref.
Worldwide	April 27, 2018	digital download; streaming	Plus 1; 21; eOne	
