= New National Anthem =

Promotional single by T.I. featuring Skylar Grey

from the album Paperwork
- Released: September 23, 2014
- Genre: Hip hop; conscious hip hop; political hip hop
- Length: 4:17
- Label: Grand Hustle; Columbia Records
- Songwriters: Clifford Harris, Jr.; Victoria Monet; Thomas "TBHITS" Brown; Dernst "D'Mile" Emile II

"New National Anthem" is a political rap song by American rapper T.I., released on September 23, 2014, through Grand Hustle and Columbia Records, as a pre-order track from Paperwork (2014). The song, produced by Tommy "TBHITS" Brown, features a guest appearance from American singer-songwriter Skylar Grey.

== Background and release ==
In June 2014, at a screening of his "No Mediocre" music video, T.I. revealed that his "New National Anthem" song, which featured a reference hook from Victoria Monet, is slated to feature American pop singer Lady Gaga, adding he was finalizing the process for getting Gaga on the song. T.I. previously worked with Gaga on "Jewels n' Drugs", from her 2013 album Artpop. However, due to her being busy recording a duet album with Tony Bennett, Gaga was not available to record with T.I.: "Unfortunately she was really busy with her current project", T.I. told Dazed.

On August 20, 2014, one day after speaking out on issues in the U.S. in his online treatise about Ferguson, Missouri, in the wake of the fatal police shooting of Michael Brown, T.I. released a new song titled "New National Anthem." The song features vocals from U.S. pop singer Skylar Grey, who has written and performed on several hit singles, including Where'd You Go", "Coming Home", "I Need a Doctor" and more. The song includes socially conscious lyrics centered on racism and injustice. On September 23, 2014, Paperwork was made available for pre-order with "New National Anthem" as the "instant gratification track". Also on September 23, the official audio for "New National Anthem" was released via T.I.'s official VEVO account. On October 20, 2014, T.I. released the official lyric video.

== Track listing ==
Digital download

1. "New National Anthem" (featuring Skylar Grey) [Explicit] – 4:17
2. "New National Anthem" (featuring Skylar Grey) [Clean] – 4:17

== Charts ==
Chart (2014)	Peak position
US Bubbling Under R&B/Hip-Hop Singles	6

== Release history ==
Country	Date	Format	Label
United States	September 23, 2014	Digital download	Grand Hustle Records, Columbia Records
