= Love Falls Over Me =

Single by Tamia

from the album Love Life
- Released: November 4, 2015
- Genre: Electro-R&B
- Length: 3:31
- Label: Plus One; Def Jam
- Songwriters: Tamia Hill; Warren Felder; Andrew Wansel; Alicia Renee Williams
- Producers: @Popwansel; @Oakwud

Tamia singles chronology
"Stuck with Me" (2015)	"Love Falls Over Me" (2015)	"Leave It Smokin'" (2018)

"Love Falls Over Me" is a song by Canadian recording artist Tamia. It was written by Tamia along with Warren Felder, Alicia Renee Williams, and Andrew Wansel for her sixth studio album Love Life (2015), while production was helmed by Felder and Wansel under their production moniker Pop & Oak. A sensual electro R&B song that has the singer gushing over the man who fills in her blanks, it was released as the album's third single on November 4, 2015. Pushed by several commissioned dance remixes that were produced by DJs Bobby Blanco, Desperados, and Stonebridge, it reached number 21 on the US Billboard Dance Club Songs chart.

== Critical reception ==
"Love Falls Over Me" received generally positive reviews from music critics. Renowned for Sound editor Marcus Floyd found that the song is "this breezy R&B infused jam with some smooth and luscious vocals" and further remarked: "Tamia sure knows how to carry a tune." ABC News journalist Allan Raible felt that the "opener is a timeless piece of glowing, electro R&B [and] another possible hit."

== Format and track listing ==
- Digital download
1. "Love Falls Over Me" – 3:31

== Credits and personnel ==
Credits adapted from the liner notes of Love Life.

- Jeremy Brown – engineering assistance
- Kevin "KD" Davis – mixing
- Chris Gehringer – mastering
- Tamia Hill – vocals, writer
- Warren Felder – production, writer
- Mark "Exit" Goodchild – engineering
- Andrew Wansel – production, writer
- Alicia Renee Williams – writer

== Charts ==
Weekly chart performance for "Love Falls Over Me"
Chart (2015)	Peak position
US Dance Club Songs (Billboard)	21
