= About the Money =

Single by T.I. featuring Young Thug

from the album Paperwork
- Released: June 3, 2014
- Recorded: 2014
- Genre: Hip hop; trap
- Length: 4:30 (single version); 5:02 (album version)
- Label: Grand Hustle; Columbia
- Songwriters: Clifford Harris, Jr.; Jeffrey Williams; London Holmes
- Producer: London on da Track

T.I. singles chronology
| "Coke Bottle" (2014) | "About the Money" (2014) | "No Mediocre" (2014) |

Young Thug singles chronology
| "Hookah" (2014) | "About the Money" (2014) | "Lifestyle" (2014) |

Music video
- "About the Money" on YouTube

"About the Money" is a song by American hip hop recording artist T.I., released on June 3, 2014, through Grand Hustle Records and Columbia Records, as the first single from his ninth studio album Paperwork. The song, which features guest vocals from fellow Atlanta-based rapper Young Thug, was produced by Young Thug's frequent collaborator London on da Track.

== Music video ==
The music video, directed by Kennedy Rothchild and T.I. himself, was released on June 2, 2014. American rapper Birdman makes a cameo appearance.

== Live performances ==
On August 8, 2014, T.I. appeared on The Tonight Show Starring Jimmy Fallon, where he performed a medley of the album's lead singles, "No Mediocre" and "About the Money", alongside Young Thug. On October 13, 2014, T.I. appeared on Jimmy Kimmel Live!, where he performed "About the Money", as well as "No Mediocre". On October 14, 2014, T.I. and Young Thug performed "About the Money" at the 2014 BET Hip Hop Awards.

== Remix ==
In an interview with The Breakfast Club, T.I. confirmed that Lil Wayne and Young Jeezy would be featured on the official remix to "About the Money". The remix was released on October 24, 2014, via DJ Whoo Kid's SoundCloud page and features verses from Wayne and Jeezy, as well as new verses from T.I. and Young Thug.

== Chart performance ==
=== Weekly charts ===
| Chart (2014–2015) | Peak position |
|---|---|
| US Billboard Hot 100 | 42 |
| US Hot R&B/Hip-Hop Songs (Billboard) | 12 |
| US Rhythmic Airplay (Billboard) | 12 |

=== Year-end charts ===
| Chart (2014) | Position |
|---|---|
| US Hot R&B/Hip-Hop Songs (Billboard) | 40 |

== Certifications ==
| Region | Certification | Certified units/sales |
|---|---|---|
| New Zealand (RMNZ) | Gold | 15,000^{‡} |
| United States (RIAA) | Gold | 500,000^{‡} |
^{‡} Sales+streaming figures based on certification alone.

== Release history ==
| Region | Date | Format | Label |
|---|---|---|---|
| United States | June 3, 2014 | Digital download | Grand Hustle; Columbia |
| United States | August 26, 2014 | Urban contemporary radio | Columbia |

== Credits and personnel ==
Credits adapted from Discogs and MusicBrainz.

=== Vocals ===
- T.I. – vocals
- Young Thug – vocals

=== Production ===
- London on da Track – producer
- Arsenio Archer – co-producer

=== Label ===
- Grand Hustle Records
- Planet Rack Records LLC (original artwork source)

=== Artwork and design ===
- The MarTian SMG (Marvin E. Haskins) – graphic design and cover artwork.
