= Stuck with Me (Tamia song) =

Single by Tamia

from the album Love Life
- Released: May 7, 2015
- Length: 4:46
- Label: Plus 1; Def Jam
- Songwriters: Rachel Assil; Kesia Hollins; Jamal Jones
- Producer: Polow da Don

Tamia singles chronology
"Sandwich and a Soda" (2015)	"Stuck with Me" (2015)	"Love Falls Over Me" (2015)

"Stuck with Me" is a song by Canadian recording artist Tamia. It was written by Rachel Assil, Kesia Hollins and Jamal Jones for her sixth studio album Love Life (2015), while production was helmed by Jones under his production moniker Polow da Don. "Stuck with Me" is a silky, romantic R&B slow jam in which the singer professes her undying love for her significant other. Musically, the light and airy groove is built upon a liquid, pulsing bass line over which Tamia sings with smoky vocals, also making use of her falsetto range.

Upon release, "Stuck with Me" received favorable reviews from critics generally who praised the sexiness of the song as well as Tamia's vocal performance. It was released by the Plus One Music Group and Def Jam Recordings as the album's second single on May 7, 2015 in the United States where it reached number 14 on the US Billboard Adult R&B Songs, becoming Love Life's highest-charting single on the chart. An accompanying black-and-white lyric video for "Stuck with Me" premiered in June 2015 and depicts a close-up solo performance by female dancer.

== Background ==
"Stuck with Me" was written by Rachel Assil, Kesia Hollins, and Polow da Don. Production on the song was also overseen by Polow. Her first collaboration with the producer, Tamia consulted Polow to have him contribute a more "progressive" sound. In a promotional interview for parent album Love Life (2015), she stated: "Polow Da Don is heavy hitting Hip hop/R&B and my voice is soft and sweet. On a song like “Stuck with Me”, it works well and the only way you know it works is if you try it." When aked about her motivation to release the song as the second single from the project, she further commented that following her unconventional first single "Sandwich and a Soda," she felt that "Stuck with Me" took her "back to that "Officially Missing You" thing. It just felt good to me and there’s a group of people that I consult and we all felt the same way about that song [...] It’s all based on feeling."

== Critical reception ==
In her Vibe review, writer Shenequa Golding wrote that "if you're looking for some good R&B tunes, Tamia's got you [...] "Stuck With Me" is a romantic ballad [...] and is the perfect soundtrack for bedroom activities." Soulbounce found that "Stuck with Me" had Tamia "back in sultry territory, with its liquid bass line and sexy melody getting us in the mood. The feeling is helped along by Tamia's breathy backing vocals, which find her cooing seductively to punctuate the verse [...] Dim the lights, slip into something comfortable and join us when you press play." Billboard called the song a "strong showing," while Joey Guerra from The Houston Chronicle complimented "Stuck With Me" for riding "a light, airy groove." Allmusic editor Andy Kellman ranked the song among the album's highlights and called it "some of the most relaxed songs" that "generate steam, and Tamia sounds fully invested in each one without doing any overselling."

== Music video ==
A lyric video for "Stuck with Me" premiered online on June 2, 2015. Shot in black-and-white, it depicts a solo performance by female dancer, set in a professional dance studio.

== Format and track listing ==
- Digital download
1. "Stuck with Me" – 4:46

== Credits and personnel ==
Credits adapted from the liner notes of Love Life.

- Rachel Assil – writing
- Jeremy Brown – assistant engineering
- Polow Da Don – production, writing
- Kevin "KD" Davis – mixing
- Chris Gehringer – mastering
- Mark "Exit" Goodchild – engineering
- Kesia" Hollins – writing

== Charts ==
Weekly chart performance for "Stuck with Me"
Chart (2015)	Peak position
US Adult R&B Songs (Billboard)	14

== Release history ==
Release history for "Stuck with Me"
Region	Date	Format	Label	Ref.
Worldwide	May 7, 2015	digital download; streaming	Plus 1; Def Jam	
