= Love Life (Tamia album) =

Studio album by Tamia
- Released: June 9, 2015
- Length: 43:57
- Labels: Plus One; Def Jam
- Producers: Brandon "B.A.M." Alexander; Shep Crawford; Oak Felder; Godz of Analog; Chuck Harmony; John Lardieri; Outer Earth; Polow da Don; Lil Ronnie; The Stereotypes; Pop Wansel

Tamia chronology
Beautiful Surprise (2012)	Love Life (2015)	Passion Like Fire (2018)

Singles from Love Life
- 1. "Sandwich and a Soda" Released: February 24, 2015; 2. "Stuck with Me" Released: May 7, 2015; 3. "Love Falls Over Me" Released: November 4, 2015

Love Life is the sixth studio album by Canadian recording artist Tamia, released on June 9, 2015 by Plus One Music Group and Def Jam Recordings. Her first major label release since More (2004), it saw Tamia consulting a diverse roster of collaborators including songwriting credits from Rachel Assil, Claude Kelly, and Dillon Pace. With much of the album completed in ten days only, she used two studios to record material for Love Life simultaneously. Production comes courtesy of the likes of Pop & Oak, The-Dream, Tricky Stewart and Polow da Don, as well as frequent collaborators The Stereotypes and Shep Crawford, among others.

Upon release, the critical response to Love Life was highly positive, eventually garnering critical acclaim for its mature lyrics, Tamia's vocalizing, and its overall "grown-up, worn-in R&B" sound. In the United States, the album debuted at number 24 on the US Billboard 200, selling 16,000 copies in its first week. It also topped the Top R&B Albums chart and reached number two on the Top R&B/Hip-Hop Albums, becoming her highest-charting album ever on both charts. Love Life produced three singles, including lead single "Sandwich and a Soda" and follow-up "Stuck with Me" both of which reached the top twenty on Billboard's Adult R&B Songs.

== Background ==
In 2004, Elektra Records released Tamia's third studio album, More. Her highest-charting release yet, it debuted at number seventeen on the US Billboard 200 and at number four on the Top R&B/Hip-Hop Albums chart, selling 58,000 copies in its first week. More was eventually certified gold by the Recording Industry Association of America (RIAA) and spawned the top forty single "Officially Missing You". The following year, Tamia split from Elektra and founded her own record label, Plus One Music Group, to gain more creative control over future projects. The first record to be released with the company was her fourth studio album Between Friends (2006). Her second album with the rooster, Beautiful Surprise, was released in 2012 after a six-year absence in which she had devoted herself to the education of her two children with retired basketball player Grant Hill. It debuted at number six on the Top R&B/Hip-Hop Albums chart and also garnered two Grammy Award nominations for Best R&B Album and Best R&B Song.

== Recording ==
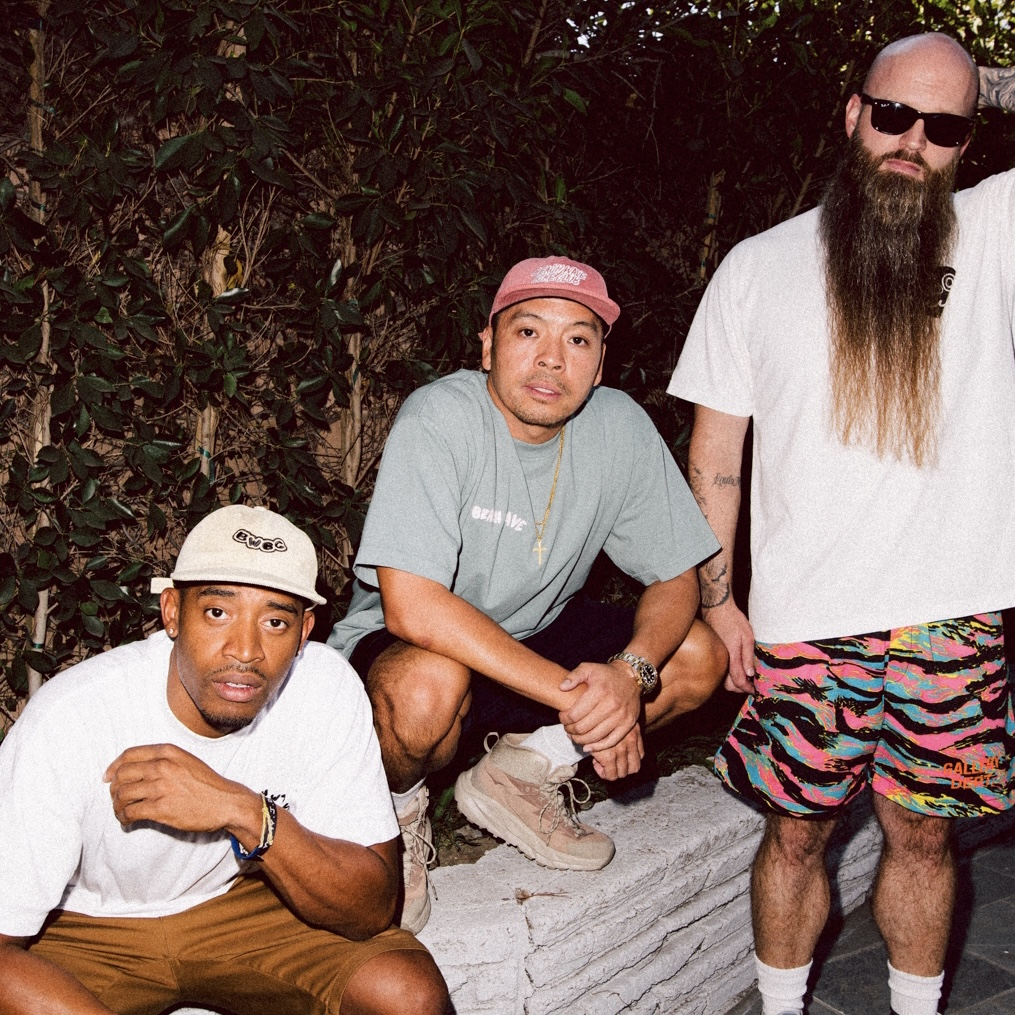
Tamia reteamed with production trio The Stereotypes on Love Life.

In August 2014, Tamia signed with Def Jam Recordings, marking her return to the major label ranks. Commenting on her transition, Tamia elaborated: "To me [labels], you kind of have to use them like a rich uncle. But they've been really awesome and have let me just do my thing." Musically, she remarked that her new album was "about loving life and about love lives. There are a lot of songs that are love songs, but it's just a happy album. It's not as deep and dark as some of my past albums; it's in a better place." A departure from her previous independent projects, Tamia worked with a wider range of high-profile producers on Love Life, including Oak Felder and Pop Wansel from duo Pop & Oak as well as frequent collaborators Claude Kelly, Shep Crawford and Godz of Analog members Christopher "Tricky" Stewart and The-Dream, both of whom co-produced two songs for the album each.

Love Life was completed in ten days. Tamia rented recording studios in Atlanta, where she used two studios to record simultaneously. She booked sessions with several producers such as The Stereotypes, Chuck Harmony, Polow da Don, and Lil Ronnie to work with them in different rooms. Writing of the songs evolved largely spontaneously; the teams would afterwards only record tracks they seriously envisioned for inclusion on the album though. Initially worried about the short recording period, Tamia would later feel confirmed in her decision when her husband reminded her that rapper Jay-Z had used similar methods of collaborating when he produced his critically acclaimed 2001 album The Blueprint "in a weekend". Recounting on the experience in the production, Tamia later stated in interview: "When it felt like we were finished, I was like 'I think this project is done'. I could have recorded 15 other songs, but this project felt finished to me. It felt weird to say that after ten days."

== Critical reception ==
Professional ratings
Aggregate scores
Source	Rating
Metacritic	79/100
Review scores
Source	Rating
AllMusic	4/5 stars
Billboard	4/5 stars
Knoxville News Sentinel	3.5/5 stars
Los Angeles Times	3/4 stars

At Metacritic, which assigns a rated mean out of 100 from mainstream critics, the album received a score of 79, which indicates "generally favorable reviews". Los Angeles Times reporter Gerrick D. Kennedy declared Love Life as "grown-up, worn-in R&B at its finest". He felt that the album "isn't about reinventing the wheel or even experimenting [...] It’s about comfort. And there’s nothing more comforting than familiar territory." Similarly, in his New York Times review, writer Ben Ratliff found "reinvention isn’t exciting unless there’s something existing to reinvent. A record like this – with grown-up passions and accountable moods, stirring key modulations, gauzy slow jams and hyper-mainstream ballads – maintains the tradition". He added that "there’s a need for albums like Love Life in general, and for albums by Tamia in particular; the understated fullness of her voice returns. But the singer’s persona matters."

Andy Kellman of AllMusic rated Love Life four out of five stars. He felt that "Tamia sounds fully invested without doing any overselling. [She] does not to attempt to hit those high notes that Deniece Williams and few others have been able to reach, but she gets the feeling across. It's a fine finish to her best album yet." Clover Hope from Billboard magazine wrote that on Love Life is "at its best when the beats settle like soft caresses and Tamia's vocals float into breathy exhales [...] Extra spice like that preserves the freshness when lagging, predictable ballads threaten the mood. As an ode to nuptial bliss, the album is both convincing and surprisingly coquettish." Marcus Floyd from Renowned for Sound called Love Life a "decent R&B album" and a "welcome return for Tamia," but felt that the "versatility between tracks" was lacking sometimes. In his review for Knoxville News Sentinel, author Chuck Campbell remarked that Love Life "isn’t especially ambitious. It’s an even-keeled adult (though not vulgar) album steeped in bliss and sensuality." He compared the album to Janet Jackson’s "That's the Way Love Goes" period (1993) but felt that its "consistent tone works for and against Love Life. It works in that the illusion never shatters, but it fails in that if a listener questions the sincerity, the release quickly sounds tedious and absurd".

== Commercial performance ==
Love Life debuted at number 24 on the US Billboard 200, selling 16,000 copies in the week ending June 14, 2015. It also debuted on top of Billboard's Top R&B Albums chart and at number two on the Top R&B/Hip-Hop Albums chart, becoming Tamia's highest-charting album ever on both charts. According to Nielsen Music, sales increased 22 percent compared to the first week sales from previous album Beautiful Surprise. Billboard ranked Love Life 85th on its Top R&B/Hip-Hop Albums year-end chart in 2015.

== Track listing ==
Love Life – Standard edition
No.	Title	Writer(s)	Producer(s)	Length
1.	"Love Falls Over Me"	Tamia Hill; Warren Felder; Andrew Wansel; Alicia Renee Williams	Pop Wansel; Oak Felder	3:31
2.	"Chaise Lounge"	Hill; Brandon "B.A.M." Alexander; Ronnie Jackson; Williams	Lil Ronnie; Alexander	3:44
3.	"Sandwich and a Soda"	Hill; Felder; Wansel; Williams; Stephen Mostyn; Autoro Whitfield	Wansel; Felder	3:14
4.	"Nowhere"	Terius Nash; Christopher Stewart	Godz of Analog	3:50
5.	"Lipstick"	Jaramye Daniels; Charles Harmon; Claude Kelly	Chuck Harmony	4:57
6.	"Special"	Nash; Stewart	Godz of Analog	4:49
7.	"Like You Do"	Hill; Jackson; Williams	Lil Ronnie	4:12
8.	"Stuck with Me"	Rachel Assil; Jamal Jones; Kesia Hollins	Polow da Don	4:46
9.	"No Lie"	Hill; Kelly; Ray McCullogh; Ryan Ridgley; Jeremy Reeves; Ray Romulus; Jonathan Yip	The Stereotypes	3:37
10.	"Day One"	Hill; Kelly; John Lardieri	Lardieri	3:49
11.	"Black Butterfly"	Barry Mann; Cynthia Weil	Shep Crawford	4:11
Total length:				43:47

US Target and international deluxe edition
No.	Title	Writer(s)	Producer(s)	Length
12.	"You Give Me Something"	Hill; Dillon Pace; Jenna Andrews; Rory Andrew	Outer Earth	3:08
13.	"Rise"	Hill; Pace; Andrews; Andrew	Outer Earth	3:27
Total length:				50:22

== Personnel ==
Performance credits

- Shep Crawford – keyboard
- Lemar Carter – drums
- Dimitrius Collins – guitar
- Sheri Hauck – background vocals
- Patrick "Guitarboy" Hayes – guitar, strings
- Tamia Hill – vocals, background vocals
- Philip "Prince" Lynah Jr. – bass

Technical and production

- Chris Gehringer – mastering
- Rob Cohen – vocal engineering
- Dawud West – art direction
- Bart Schoudel – engineering
- Ronnie Jackson – vocal production, instrumentation
- Tai Linzie – artwork
- Mark "Exit" Goodchild – engineering
- Jeff Edwards – engineering
- Phillip Scott III – drum programming
- Terius Nash – programming
- Eddie Smith III – programming
- Ken Oriole – engineering
- Kyle Kashiwagi – engineering
- Brian Anzel – engineering
- Mario "Rio" Moore – engineering
- Matt Burnette-Lemon – package production
- Ace Nicklutz – engineering
- Mike Sal – Assistant engineering

== Charts ==
=== Weekly charts ===
Weekly chart performance for Love Life
Chart (2015)	Peak position
US Billboard 200	24
US Top R&B/Hip-Hop Albums (Billboard)	2

=== Year-end charts ===
Year-end chart performance for Love Life
Chart (2015)	Position
US Top R&B/Hip-Hop Albums (Billboard)	85

== Release history ==
Love Life release history
Region	Date	Format	Label	Ref(s)
Various	June 9, 2015	CD; digital download; streaming	Plus One; Def Jam	
