= Passion Like Fire =

Studio album by Tamia
- Released: September 7, 2018
- Length: 44:29
- Label: Plus One; E1 Music
- Producer: Daniel Bryant; Shep Crawford; Ryan Hawken; King BNJMN; Lil' Ronnie; Salaam Remi; Julio Reyes Copello; Major Seven

Tamia chronology
Love Life (2015)	Passion Like Fire (2018)

Singles from Passion Like Fire
- 1. "Leave It Smokin'" Released: April 27, 2018; 2. "Today I Do" Released: July 24, 2018; 3. "It's Yours" Released: October 16, 2018

Passion Like Fire is the seventh studio album by Canadian singer Tamia. It was released on September 7, 2018 through Plus One Music Group and 21 Entertainment. Her first project to be distributed by eOne Music, its release marked twenty years since the release of her solo debut single "Imagination" and its eponymous parent album. A breakaway from her previous album Love Life (2015), the singer worked with a smaller team of collaborators on the album, involving longtime contributors Shep Crawford and Salaam Remi as well as songwriters Lundon Knighten and Jonas Myrin and chief producer Lil' Ronnie and his team.

The album debuted at number 145 on the US Billboard 200, becoming her lowest-charting album yet, while reaching number 17 on Top R&B Albums chart. Its release was preceded by the singles "Leave It Smokin'" and "Today I Do", the former of which became her biggest hit in years, peaking at number two on Billboard's Adult R&B Songs. A third single, "It's Yours", reached the top ten on the same chart. In support of the album, Tamia embarked on the Passion Like Fire Tour which launched on September 18, 2018 and visited most of the major US cities as well as several international venues.

== Background ==
In 2015, Tamia signed a recording deal with Def Jam Recordings. Her contract marked her return to the major label rank after a decade of independent studio releases through her own label Plus One Music Group. Love Life, her first album with the Def Jam, saw Tamia consulting a diverse roster of collaborators, including production credits from Pop & Oak, The-Dream, Tricky Stewart, and Polow da Don as well as frequent collaborators The Stereotypes and Shep Crawford. Upon release, the critical response to album was highly positive. It debuted at number 24 on the US Billboard 200, selling 16,000 copies in its first week. It also topped the Top R&B Albums chart and reached number two on the Top R&B/Hip-Hop Albums, becoming Tamia's highest-charting album ever on both charts.

Following the termination of her one-record deal with Def Jam, Tamia began work her on her seventh album Passion Like Fire independently again under eOne Music and 21 Entertainment Group. In contrast to Love Life, she recruited a smaller team of collaborators for the album, including producer Lil' Ronnie who would contribute one half to the album's final track listing, leading to his executive producer status on the album. Tamia also reteamed with Salaam Remi, and Shep Crawford, and worked with duo Reyes Copello and Ryan Hawken on more songs. The album title Passion Like Fire borrows from the chorus lyrics of the album cut "Leave It Smokin'" in which she sings "I need passion like fire, leave it smokin'." When asked about what prompted her to name the album after that lyrics, Tamia remarked that it alludes to her longevity in music business about which she still feels passionate after twenty years.

== Critical reception ==
Professional ratings
Review scores
Source	Rating
Rolling Stone	3/5 stars
Soul in Stereo	4/5 stars

Los Angeles Times writer Gerrick D. Kennedy found that Passion Like Fire "is more of the sultry, grown-up R&B-soul Tamia has delivered effortlessly for two decades now [...] Despite a current R&B landscape that favors experimentation and hip-hop edge, Hill has remained one of the few steadfast talents who rebukes trend-chasing, and her new album sees the singer playing directly to her strengths." SoulinStereo wrote that Passion Like Fire "feels like such a love letter to Tamia’s fans. From the power ballads to the sultry singles to the playful odes to love lost and found, it revisits many of the sounds that build her career. I really wish we had a couple of tracks as strong as the lead single to really set this album apart in Tamia’s renowned catalog."

In his review for Rolling Stone magazine, Elias Light rated Passion Like Fire three out of five stars. He felt that while Tamia's "voice is always resplendent", she "doesn't find enough sharp songs" to include on the album. Complimenting her collaborations with Salaam Remi and Shep Crawford, he criticized her decision to work with Lil' Ronnie on the majority of the album, commenting that "these two never gel". SoulTracks editor Charles Melody felt that the album was lackluster compared to her previous work on Love Life, but "still demonstrates the lyrical depth, vocal range and uniquely sweet, saucy that keeps her in demand and a part of the post-90's mix." He remarked thath Passion Like Fire comes across as sort of a misnomer. The dominance of ballads and scattering of midtempos make it less of a buoyant listen overall, although still a worthy one." Matt Collar of AllMusic found that the album "showcases the singer's sophisticated and mature R&B sound."

== Commercial performance ==
In the United States, Passion Like Fire debuted at number 145 on the US Billboard 200 in the issue dated September 22, 2018, becoming Tamia's lowest debut as well as her first studio album to miss the upper half on the chart. It also reached number six on Billboard's Independent Albums chart. The album also peaked at number 17 on the Top R&B Albums, marking her first project not to chart on the Top R&B/Hip-Hop Albums chart.

== Track listing ==
Passion Like Fire track listing
No.	Title	Writer(s)	Producer(s)	Length
1.	"If I Had to Choose"	Tamia Hill; Jeremiah Bethea; Daniel Bryant; Ronnie Jackson	Lil' Ronnie; Bryant	3:12
2.	"Leave It Smokin'"	Hill; Salaam Remi; Alicia Renee Williams	Remi	3:54
3.	"It's Yours"	Hill; Bethea; Jackson; Philip Lynah Jr.; Benjamin Singh Reynolds; Omar Walker	Lil' Ronnie; Major Seven; King BNJMN	4:37
4.	"Lost in You"	Hill; Bethea; Bryant; Jackson; Lynah; Rafael Ishman	Lil' Ronnie; Bryant^{[A]}	3:27
5.	"Today I Do"	Hill; Bethea; Jackson	Lil' Ronnie	3:29
6.	"When the Sun Comes Up"	Hill; Bethea; Bryant; Jackson; Ishman	Lil' Ronnie; Bryant	2:51
7.	"Tell Me How"	Hill; Ryan Hawken; Shep Crawford	Crawford; Hawken	4:18
8.	"Deeper"	Hill; Lundon Knighten; Jonas Myrin; Julio Reyes Copello	Copello	3.56
9.	"Stay"	Hill; Copello; Nicolas de la Espriella; Hawken; Briana Martinez	Copello; Hawken	3:33
10.	"Not for Long"	Hill; Bethea; Bryant; Jackson; Lynah; Ishman	Lil' Ronnie; Bryant^{[A]}	3:38
11.	"Better"	Hill; Hawken; Crawford	Crawford; Hawken	3:52
12.	"You Are Loved"	Hill; Crawford	Crawford	3:42
Total length:				44:52

Notes

- ^{^[A]} denotes co-producer

== Personnel ==
Performance credits

- Daniel Bryant – instruments
- Julio Reyes Copello – piano
- Shep Crawford – instruments
- The Experience Christian Ministries (ECM) Praise Team – background vocals
- Grey Hawken – background vocals, instruments
- Phillip Lynah – guitar
- Lil' Ronnie – instruments
- Briana Martinez – background vocals
- Jonas Myrin – background vocals
- Clinton C. Peacock – piano
- Natalia Ramirez – background vocals
- Jack Rochon – guitar
- Juan Camilo Sanchez – background vocals
- Benjamin Singh-Reynolds – instruments
- Shy Suber – guitar
- Salaam Remi – instruments
- Omar Walker – instruments
- Jordan Welch – background vocals

Technical and production

- Jason L. Blackerby – recording engineer
- J. Bolin – creative director
- Julio Reyes Copello – recording engineer
- Kevin "KD" Davis – mixing
- Nicolas de la Espriella – recording engineer
- Chris Gehringer – mastering
- Gray Hawken – recording engineer
- Tamia Hill – executive producer
- Phillip Lynah – recording engineer
- Gary Noble – mixing
- Marcus Owens – photography
- Lil' Ronnie – executive producer
- Salaam Remi – recording engineer
- Phillip Scott III – recording engineer
- Victoria Westfall – creative director

== Charts ==
Chart performance for Passion Like Fire
Chart (2018)	Peak position
US Billboard 200	145
US Independent Albums (Billboard)	6
US Top R&B Albums (Billboard)	17

== Release history ==
Passion Like Fire release history
Region	Date	Format(s)	Label	Ref
Various	September 7, 2018	Digital download; CD	Plus One	
