= Pepsi Beats of the Beautiful Game =

Compilation album by Various Artists
- Released: June 9, 2014
- Recorded: 2014
- Genres: Pop, R&B
- Languages: English, Spanish, Portuguese, Arabic
- Label: Caroline Records

Singles from Pepsi Beats of the Beautiful Game
- 1. "Heroes" Released: May 2, 2014; 2. "Pura Vida" Released: May 12, 2014; 3. "Unstoppable" Released: May 20, 2014

Pepsi Beats of the Beautiful Game is a compilation album that features various artists. The album was released on June 9, 2014, ahead of 2014 FIFA World Cup that kicked off June 12 in Brazil.

The largest music, film and football collaboration in Pepsi's history, with 11 short films by "dynamic" directors including Spike Lee, Idris Elba, Indrani Pal-Chaudhuri, Diego Luna, Jessy Terrero, and Andy Morahan among others. "This visual album is a celebration of different artistic talents...elevating these artforms to an equal plane and showcasing them on a global level," said Frank Cooper III, Chief Marketing Officer, Global Consumer Engagement, PepsiCo Global Beverages Group.

== Background ==
Pepsi Max premiered the songs from the album as singles on the iTunes store, with accompanying film tracks free to watch on their website, YouTube and VEVO.

== Track listing ==
| No. | Title | Performer(s) | Length |
|---|---|---|---|
| 1. | "Kicking Down Doors" | Santigold | 3:32 |
| 2. | "I Will Never Let You Down" (Switch Remix) | Rita Ora | 3:48 |
| 3. | "Heroes" | Janelle Monáe | 3:20 |
| 4. | "Pura Vida" | Don Omar | 3:21 |
| 5. | "Unstoppable" | R3hab featuring Eva Simons | 3:33 |
| 6. | "Crescendo" | Jetta | 3:00 |
| 7. | "The Game" | Kelly Rowland | 2:59 |
| 8. | "Whoever We Are" | Timbaland featuring Rachel Assil | 3:18 |
| 9. | "Ahlam Men Gedid" | Hassan El Shafei featuring Hossam Habib | 5:08 |
| 10. | "Now Is the Time" | Jolin Tsai | 3:53 |
| 11. | "Guerriera" | Pearls Negras | 3:31 |

== Music videos ==
| Title | Artist(s) | Director(s) | Video(s) |
|---|---|---|---|
| "Heroes" | Janelle Monáe | The Young Astronauts | YouTube |
| "Pura Vida" | Don Omar | Jessy Terrero | YouTube |
| "I Will Never Let You Down" (Switch Remix) | Rita Ora | Diego Luna | YouTube |
| "Unstoppable" | R3hab featuring Eva Simons | Idris Elba | YouTube |
| "Crescendo" | Jetta music producer Pharrell Williams video producer GK Reid | Indrani Pal-Chaudhuri | YouTube |
| "The Game" | Kelly Rowland | Spike Lee | YouTube |
| "Kicking Down Doors" | Santigold | Andy Morahan | YouTube |
| "Whoever We Are" | Timbaland starring Rachel Assil | The Kolton Brothers | YouTube |
| "Guerreira" | Pearls Negras | Armando Fonseca (Cine Favela) | YouTube |
| "Now Is the Time" | Jolin Tsai | Muh Chen | YouTube |

== Release history ==
| Region | Date | Format | Label |
|---|---|---|---|
| Worldwide | June 9, 2014 | Standard edition (digital) | Caroline Records |
| United States | June 10, 2014 | Standard edition (digital) | Caroline Records |
