= It's Yours (Tamia song) =

Single by Tamia

from the album Passion Like Fire
- Released: October 16, 2018
- Recorded: 2018
- Genre: R&B
- Length: 3:37
- Label: Plus 1; 21; eOne
- Songwriters: Tamia Hill; Jeremiah Bethea; Ronnie Jackson; Philip Lynah Jr.; Benjamin Singh-Reynolds; Omar Walker
- Producers: Lil' Ronnie; Major Seven; King BNJMN

Tamia singles chronology
"Today I Do" (2018)	"It's Yours" (2018)	"Three Little Words" (2024)

"It's Yours" is a song by Canadian recording artist Tamia. It was written by Tamia along with Jeremiah Bethea, Ronnie Jackson, Philip Lynah Jr., Benjamin "King BNJMN" Singh-Reynolds, and Omar "Major Seven" Walker, and produced by Lil' Ronnie, Major Seven, and King BNJMN for her seventh studio album Passion Like Fire (2018). A sultry mid-tempo groove, "It's Yours" is a R&B slow-jam that features an instrumentation consisting of piano, synthesizers, thumping bass and hi-hat. Lyrically, it has the singer talking about being ready for an erotic encounter.

The song was selected and released as the album's third single on October 16, 2018, following "Leave It Smokin'" and "Today I Do." It was positively received by music critics who ranked it among the standout songs on the album. A sleeper hit on urban radio, it peaked at number seven on the US Billboard Adult R&B Songs more than six months after its initial release, becoming the second single from Passion Like Fire to reach the top ten. The final single to be lifted from the project, it was included in the setlist for the Passion Like Fire Tour (2018–19).

== Background ==
"It's Yours" was written by Tamia, Jeremiah Bethea, Ronnie Jackson, Philip Lynah Jr., Benjamin "King BNJMN" Singh-Reynolds, and Omar "Major Seven" Walker. Production was helmed by Lil' Ronnie, Major Seven, and King BNJMN, the former of which produced the majority on parent album Passion Like Fire. Recording of "It's Yours" took place at the Pacifique Studios in Los Angeles and was overseen by Phillip Lynah, with Kevin "KD" Davis mixing. Set in a mid-tempo groove, "It's Yours" is a sultry R&B slow-jam. Musically, the song makes use of a piano, synthesizers, a thumping bass and hi-hats.

== Critical reception ==
Essence journalist Sydney Scott felt that the song is "just as sexy as the rest of the album: The bedroom tune is just as spicy as you’d imagine." Uproxx called "It's Yours" a "standout slow jam," while Singersroom editor Gary Gentles found that "the sultry singer/songwriter oozes sensuality through lush and intoxicating vocals while telling us how she pleases her man." SoulTracks editor Charles Melody praised Tamia's vocal performance on the "coquettish" song. SoulinStereo remarked that the song "wouldn’t sound out of place on urban playlists," and added that “It’s Yours” "is a great case study of an artist adjusting [Tamia's] style with the times yet retaining her artistic integrity." Elias Light from Rolling Stone noted that "the instrumentation in “It’s Yours” shades too close to Beyoncé’s "1+1" (2011).

== Chart performance ==
"It's Yours" peaked at number seven on the US Billboard Adult R&B Songs chart in the week of March 16, 2019. It became Tamia's 13th top ten hit on the chart. Billboard ranked the song 28th on the Adult R&B Songs chart's 2019 year-end listing. It also entered the top thirty of the R&B/Hip-Hop Airplay chart.

== Track listing ==
Digital download

1. "It's Yours" – 3:37

== Credits and personnel ==
Credits adapted from the liner notes of Passion Like Fire.

- Jeremiah Bethea – writer
- Tamia Hill – writer
- Ronnie Jackson – instruments, writer
- Philip Lynah Jr. – guitar, writer
- Jeremiah "Sickpen" Renaldo – writer
- Benjamin "King BNJMN" Singh-Reynolds – instruments, production, writer
- Omar "Major Seven" Walker – instruments, production, writer

== Charts ==
=== Weekly charts ===
Chart (2018–19)	Peak position
US R&B/Hip-Hop Airplay (Billboard)	30

=== Year-end charts ===
Chart (2019)	Position
US Adult R&B Songs (Billboard)	28
