= Paperwork (album) =

Studio album by T.I.
- Released: October 21, 2014
- Recorded: 2012–2014
- Genres: Hip-hop; trap
- Length: 62:31 (standard edition); 74:30 (deluxe edition)
- Labels: Columbia; Grand Hustle
- Producers: Pharrell Williams; DJ Mustard; The-Dream; The Beat Bully; DJ Toomp; Jazzfeezy; Kenoe; London on da Track; Mars of 1500 or Nothin'; Ace Harris; Sak Pase; Steve Samson; TBHits; Tricky Stewart

T.I. chronology
| Trouble Man: Heavy Is the Head (2012) | Paperwork (2014) | Da' Nic (2015) |

Singles from Paperwork
- 1. "About the Money" Released: June 3, 2014; 2. "No Mediocre" Released: June 17, 2014; 3. "Private Show" Released: February 24, 2015

Paperwork is the ninth studio album by American rapper T.I. It was released on October 21, 2014, by Grand Hustle Records and Columbia Records. The album is his first project under Columbia Records, after his contract with Atlantic Records expired, following the release of his eighth album Trouble Man: Heavy Is the Head (2012). Paperwork derives its title from T.I.'s most successful project, his sixth album Paper Trail (2008). Paperwork features guest appearances from Chris Brown, The-Dream, Jeezy, Skylar Grey, Nipsey Hussle, Rick Ross, Victoria Monet, Trae tha Truth and Pharrell Williams, the latter of which served as the album's executive producer. Aside from Pharrell, the album's production was handled by several high-profile producers such as DJ Mustard, DJ Toomp, TBHits and London on da Track, among others.

The album was supported by three official singles: "About the Money" featuring Young Thug, "No Mediocre" featuring Iggy Azalea and "Private Show" featuring Chris Brown.

== Background ==
After releasing his eighth studio album Trouble Man: Heavy Is the Head, in December 2012, T.I. revealed he drew a close to his 10-year contract with Atlantic Records. On November 22, 2013, after searching for a label to sign his Grand Hustle imprint, as well as himself, T.I announced that he signed a record deal with Columbia Records, to release his ninth studio album. He also revealed that his longtime collaborator and an American musician Pharrell Williams (who has been influential in his move to Columbia), would serve as the album's executive producer. T.I. was planning to release an album, under the title, called Trouble Man II: He Who Wears The Crown as the sequel to his previous album. However, he would postpone that name of the album after he has been recording in a studio with Pharrell, stating: "All I'ma say is, it's gonna be a motion picture, it's gonna be a theatrical-worthy title. Something that will definitely seem instant classic. I'm thinking something like 'Trap Champion', 'Paperwork,' but whatever it is the subtitle will be 'The Motion Picture'". Later in the year, T.I finally revealed that the album would be titled Paperwork. In April 2014, when speaking on the album's title, he said: "Paperwork is official. If you've got paperwork on something, it's official. Also, if someone has paperwork on you, then it could be some trouble. So, it's official, it's trouble, it's authentic. Sounds like me. The music supports this theory very well."

On January 27, 2014, in an interview with XXL, T.I. revealed the concept for the album, stating "people forgot the feeling that you got when [you] watched Boyz n the Hood for the first time. Or when you heard All Eyez on Me for the first time. Right now, music is going in a different direction and it is in a different place. I salute and celebrate that path as well. However, there's a place for the story that needs to be told from our perspective."

In July 2014, during an interview Devi Dev and Mr. Rogers of Houston's 93.7, T.I. spoke about the correlation between Paperwork and his critically acclaimed 2008 album Paper Trail: "I think one of my most diversified albums and I guess the most commercially successful has been Paper Trail. I always wanted to do a continuation of that but without saying, 'Part 2.' I just tried to figure out another way to relate this next project to that one without making it a sequel. In thinking of other things that I guess had the word 'paper' in it, Paperwork was the most prominent title that jumped out at me. As I was getting to think about it, anything that you have that is authentic, let's say a watch, a car, a phone, whatever it is, the certification of that authenticity is paperwork. Whether it's a title for a car, deed to a house, a certificate for a Rolex. You gon' have some kind of certification of authenticity. Me being an artist that's been known to be authentic and making music that has been known to be authentic, the certification of it is Paperwork."

In an interview with Bootleg Kev, T.I. revealed the album's guest list such as Rick Ross, The-Dream, Lil Boosie, Jeezy, Trae tha Truth, Nipsey Hussle and Problem, among others. When speaking on the sound of the album, T.I. stated "The sound sonically of this one is soulful, musical, kinda like (OutKast's) Southernplayalisticadillacmuzik or Aquemini or (Jay Z's) Blueprint. It just has an incredible amount of soul and a perfect hybrid between the ahead-of-the-curve, new-school sound and the classic, nostalgic, soulful sound of yesteryear."

In August 2014, in an interview with Rolling Stone, when asked what the focus of his attention is at the moment, T.I. responded: "This album. This album or should I say these three albums, because this album has kind of turned into a trilogy. The music, we already have it, it's already done. We just have to really platform it, promote it, market it, and strategically apply it. But this album, we hope to make a film that will consist of three short stories. And each of these three short stories will combine six or seven videos from these three albums. And it would star me playing characters. But these characters would find themselves in situations that would allow the music to narrate the circumstances. It's extremely ambitious and could be very costly. But I feel like it's your ninth album and you've got to use your seniority and your success and your relationships and resources, you've got to use them to do something significantly different. Or else you're just another motherfucker putting out an album."

== Recording and production ==
In January 2014, in an interview with XXL, T.I. revealed he had already been in the studio with the likes of Jeezy and Busta Rhymes. He also revealed he was particularly excited about reuniting once again with American singer-songwriter Justin Timberlake, with whom he has recorded the hit singles "My Love" and "Dead and Gone". The song, produced by longtime friend and frequent collaborator DJ Toomp, is titled "Trap Me Up". When speaking on his recording sessions with executive producer Pharrell, T.I. stated: "me and Pharrell have a plethora [of songs]. We probably done recorded 14 records. Pharrell and I alone. Words couldn't even begin to describe how cutting-edge, left-field and just how broad these records are. But they still have that texture that I speak of. They still have that Curtis Mayfield, Bobby Womack, a ridin' dirty kind of … but a new way to present it to the world because it has that thing that Pharrell does to music that sets it apart from any and everything else that's being played." T.I. also made it known he had worked with American record producers Keno and Sham "Sak Pase" Joseph, as well as his protege B.o.B.

In February 2014, in an interview with DJ Whoo Kid, T.I. revealed a song titled "Trap Nigga Hustle", which he recorded two years prior, would appear on the album. In April 2014, when speaking on the album T.I. said: "This is the first time in my career that I have had enough time to create all the music, get the sequencing down, even before I start my clock and put myself on the calendar," he added. "Now that I have all of the music...I could take my time and step back and make sure it's the perfect blend, to create the perfect amount of synergy between trap music and art house." On April 4, 2014, T.I. visited New York City radio station Hot 97, where he revealed that he recorded 250 records for Paperwork and that Pharrell would be producing the bulk of the new album.

We recorded like 250 songs, me and Pharrell probably did like 25, and with so much music, all of it did not cohesively mesh well enough to put on one project. For one, it would've been 50 songs long and two, it just would've been all over the place. However, we have broken it up into three separate projects. The first one has a cohesive sound sonically, a message and a concept that can be all packaged and presented together. And the second project as well. And certainly the same with the third. All the music is already done. We're gonna release these albums, hopefully, six to nine months apart.

— T.I., discussing the Paperwork trilogy in an August 2014 interview with Complex

In June 2014, at a screening of his "No Mediocre" music video, T.I. stated he plans on channeling his inner Tupac Shakur, specifically referencing the late emcee's "2 of Amerikaz Most Wanted" selection. Also at the screening, T.I. confirmed that his "New National Anthem" song, which featured a reference hook from Victoria Monet, is slated to feature Lady Gaga, adding he was finalizing the process for getting Gaga on the song. On July 23, 2014, after a listening session of Paperwork, Devi Dev of Houston's 93.7, tweeted: "Really dug the track Tip has with Jeezy too. Jeezy opened his verse saying 'When Jay was beefing with Nas I was selling Cocaine'#Paperwork".

At the listening session with 93.7 The Beat's Devi Dev & DJ Mr. Rogers, it was revealed the direction for Paperwork was outlined as such from T.I. and Pharrell bouncing ideas off one another in the early recordings. There's more pianos, more '70s blaxplotated horns, more ideas of superhero music and several soul samples chopped throughout Paperwork: "I want to help redefine the sound of trap music," said T.I. When asked if this was more of a "Song Cry" like approach, he nodded. On August 14, 2014, T.I. revealed that guest appearances on the album would include Jeezy, Trae tha Truth, Nipsey Hussle, Big Kuntry King, Problem, Rick Ross, The-Dream and Lil Boosie, among others. In an August 2014 interview with Complex, T.I. revealed the song he recorded with Justin Timberlake would not appear on this album; it would however appear on the following album, the sequel to Paperwork.

== Release and promotion ==
Of those 20 [songs on the album], I want to take six records at the top, six records in the middle, six records at the end, with two records as intermissions to the three. And I would like to shoot a movie that consists of three short stories, and the three short stories will connect these six records.

— T.I., discussing his strategic plan in releasing Paperwork, HotNewHipHop

On April 4, 2014, T.I. visited New York City radio station Hot 97, where he revealed that he recorded 250 records for Paperwork. After narrowing down a 20-song track list, T.I. later explained his strategic plan in releasing and putting together the new album. He said that the album is split into three parts of 6 songs each, with two more records connecting as intermissions between the parts. Each section will be assisted by a short film and released along with the album. Therefore, it's like three separate extended plays (EP's), with a short film for each. According to T.I., Pharrell suggested that instead of selling Paperwork as one album, to break it up into three EP's for the three short stories. He plans on releasing the album as a complete package similar to Beyoncé's launch of Beyoncé (2013), however T.I. believes his way of releasing will be financially better: "Where I see she and I differ is she went and shot individual video one by one by one. That must've drove the cost through the roof. Me, myself personally I'm doing three short stories. I'm not doing 18 videos, I'm doing three short stories. So the same way we would shoot an episode of House of Lies. We would take five days. This short story shall be complete. Five days, this short story shall be complete. See that will bring my cost down, which will raise my profit margin."

On May 9, 2014, T.I. released a music video for a song titled "Turn It", in promotion for Paperwork. On July 21, 2014, via his Twitter feed, T.I. revealed a song titled "Stay", would be featured on the album and promoted the song through the Samsung Mobile app, Owner's Hub. However the song was later leaked online. On July 23, 2014, T.I. performed "Bring Em Out", "What You Know" and "No Mediocre", on Vh1's new show, SoundClash. On August 8, 2014, T.I. released a song of him freestyling over Bobby Shmurda's viral hit "Hot Nigga". In an interview with Bootleg Kev in August 2014, although he did not give an exact release date, T.I. said it would arrive "somewhere in Libra season." On August 8, 2014, T.I. appeared on The Tonight Show Starring Jimmy Fallon, where he was interviewed and performed a medley of "No Mediocre" and "About the Money", alongside Young Thug.

On August 12, 2014, at an invite-only event held at Simons Nightclub in Downtown Gainesville, LouddMagazine in conjunction with Aviators Design Studio, and many more entities, had the opportunity to get a sneak listen to Paperwork. T.I. unveiled eight exclusive tracks from the album and revealed it is set to be released in mid-September. LouddMagazine had the chance to have a brief Q&A session with T.I., as he spoke with them about what went into making the project, and how he created a "timeless album that had a great amount of soul." LouddMagazine wrote three of the tracks revealed were "G-Shit", the title track "Paperwork", and "the smooth and gritty sounds of 'About my Issues' exemplify that this project is sure to be just what he set out for it to become, simply a classic." When questioned about what inspired "New National Anthem", T.I. stated: "Certain things need to be said, and I'm the only one who will talk about it, so I did". T.I. also revealed a few featured artists at the listening session, from Jeezy and Nipsey Hustle to Chris Brown and an Atlanta-based trapstep trio called Watch The Duck.

In a featured article on Billboard, which was issued August 22, 2014, it was revealed the album would be released on October 21, 2014. On August 25, 2014, T.I. unveiled the album's cover art. The official track-listing for Paperwork was unveiled on September 19, 2014. Later that day, T.I. released G.D.O.D. II, the second compilation mixtape showcasing his Grand Hustle label, where he appeared on 19 of the 20 tracks. The album was made available for pre-order through digital retailers on September 23, 2014. Those who pre-ordered the album received the two lead singles, as well as "New National Anthem" as an "instant-gratification track". On October 21, 2014, T.I. released the music video for the album's intro, titled "King". On October 28, 2014, T.I. appeared on Late Night with Seth Meyers, where he performed "G Shit", alongside Jeezy and Watch The Duck.

=== Singles ===
On June 3, 2014, T.I. released a song, titled "About the Money", which features a guest verse from a fellow Atlanta-based rapper Young Thug, as the album's first single via digital distribution. The song was produced by Young Thug's frequent collaborator, London on da Track. The music video for "About The Money" (directed by Kennedy Rothchild and T.I. himself) was officially released on June 2, 2014. The song debuted on the US Billboard Hot 100 chart at number 99 on the week of August 14, 2014. The track has since peaked at number 42 on the Hot 100 chart and is Vevo certified for receiving over 100,000,000 views.

On June 17, 2014, T.I. released a track, called "No Mediocre" as the album's lead single (second overall). The song features a guest verse from T.I.'s protégé, Australian rapper Iggy Azalea, with the production that was provided by West Coast hip hop record producer DJ Mustard. In June 2014, T.I. held a theatrical screening of his "No Mediocre" music video, in New York City. The video was filmed in Rio de Janeiro, Brazil, and premiered on June 18, 2014, on MTV and Vh1. The song has since peaked at number 33 on the US Billboard Hot 100, making it T.I.'s seventeenth Top 40 single as a lead artist on that chart.

On August 20, 2014, one day after speaking out on America in his online treatise about Ferguson, Missouri, in the wake of the fatal police shooting of Michael Brown, T.I. released a new song, titled "New National Anthem". The song features guest vocals from American singer-songwriter Skylar Grey, includes socially conscious lyrics centered on racism and injustice. On September 23, 2014, Paperwork was made available for pre-order with "New National Anthem" as a promotional single.

On January 28, 2015, T.I. released the music video for "G Shit" as the album's second promotional single, which features guest appearances from Jeezy and Watch the Duck, with the production that was provided by Pharrell Williams. The video is a short film of sorts, and it was directed by Chris Robinson and features a cast, including Rotimi and Wood Harris.

On May 12, 2015, T.I. released the music video for "Private Show" as the album's third single, which features guest vocals from American recording artist Chris Brown, with the production that was provided by Sak Pase, Anthony Garner and Ace Harris.

== Music and lyrics ==
In August 2014, during an interview with MTV News, T.I. spoke on the next song from Paperwork: "We have definitely decided on 'Paperwork' featuring Pharrell [because it] pretty much kinda sums up the tone of the album. The cinematic presentation of it all. When you listen to the album, top to bottom, it kinda sounds like the score to a movie and I think 'Paperwork' is the perfect introduction to that." On September 23, 2014, it was revealed the title-track "Paperwork", would be released on October 7, via the iTunes Store as another "instant gratification track". As reported, on October 7, the track was released, with Rap-Up.com describing the song as: "The Grand Hustle chief reminisce[ing] about learning the ropes from his Uncle Quentin and dealing at age 17, while Pharrell provides the soulful hook and production."

== Critical reception ==
Professional ratings
Aggregate scores
| Source | Rating |
|---|---|
| Metacritic | 69/100 |
Review scores
| Source | Rating |
| AllMusic | 4/5 stars |
| Billboard | 7/10 |
| Cuepoint (Expert Witness) | (1-star Honorable Mention) |
| Exclaim! | 6/10 |
| HipHopDX | 3/5 stars |
| The Observer | 3/5 stars |
| Pitchfork | 7.0/10 |
| Rolling Stone | 3/5 stars |
| RapReviews | 7.5/10 |
| XXL | 4/5 stars |

Paperwork received generally favorable reviews from music critics. At Metacritic, which assigns a normalized rating out of 100 to reviews from critics, the album received an average score of 69, which indicates "generally favorable reviews", based on 10 reviews. David Jeffries of AllMusic said, "There are moments on Paperwork where rapper T.I. sounds as vital, bright, infectious, and tuneful as Nas in his prime, but don't get it twisted, as this vibrant effort is often so pop that it is more like an Illmatic aimed at taking on the chart dominance of Iggy Azalea and not the gang violence in Queensbridge." Eric Zaworski of Exclaim! stated, "Despite the two massive summer hits, what holds Paperwork: The Motion Picture back is its very obvious approach to the mainstream rap release formula – it all just feels so calculated. Naturally, the big highlight is the Young Thug feature, which, for a single, is full of curveballs and originality. Perhaps that track was a lucky strike, because it outshines the album's other attempts to package fresh ideas into a radio-friendly format." Carl Lamarre of XXL stated, "With Paperwork serving as the follow-up and continuation to Trouble Man: Heavy Is The Head, T.I. accurately gives us a perfect sequel with his new album. Despite the album's loaded guest list, T.I. manages to squeeze in enough room to allow himself to shine and tells us why after nearly 15 years deep; he's still a top-tier artist in the game." Kellan Miller of HipHopDX said, "Paperwork plays out as an uneven effort that isn't so much inherently flawed as it is unentertaining through long stretches. Even with an increased reliance on an updated version of the double-time cadence he perfected on King, the subject matter covered comes across as trite with little to no emotional resonance."

== Commercial performance ==
The album debuted at number two on the US Billboard 200, behind Slipknot's .5: The Gray Chapter, with first-week sales of 80,000 copies in the United States. In its second week, the album dropped to number 13 on the chart, selling 27,000 copies. In its third week, the album dropped to number 20 on the chart, selling 16,000 copies, bringing its total album sales to 123,000 copies. In its fourth week, the album dropped to number 33 on the chart, selling 10,000 copies. As of December 10, 2014, the album has sold 157,000 copies.

In 2014, Paperwork was ranked as the 149th most popular album of the year on the Billboard 200.

== Track listing ==
| No. | Title | Writer(s) | Producer(s) | Length |
|---|---|---|---|---|
| 1. | "King" | Clifford Harris, Jr.; Lamar Edwards; Michael Cox, Jr.; John Groover; Gareth Dunlop | Mars of 1500 or Nothin' | 3:06 |
| 2. | "G Shit" (featuring Jeezy and Watch the Duck) | Harris, Jr.; Jay Jenkins; Mitchelle'l Sium; Pharrell Williams | P. Williams | 3:43 |
| 3. | "About the Money" (featuring Young Thug) | Harris, Jr.; Jeffrey Williams; London Holmes | London on da Track | 5:02 |
| 4. | "New National Anthem" (featuring Skylar Grey) | Harris, Jr.; Victoria Monét; Tommy Brown; Dernst Emile II; Holly Hafermann | TBHits | 4:17 |
| 5. | "Oh Yeah" (featuring Pharrell) | Harris, Jr.; P. Williams | P. Williams | 3:54 |
| 6. | "Private Show" (featuring Chris Brown) | Harris, Jr.; Lasanna Harris; Shama "Sak Pase" Joseph; Anthony Garner; Maurice Simmonds; Chad Butler; Bernard Freeman; Christopher Brown | Sak Pase; Garner; Ace Harris | 4:19 |
| 7. | "No Mediocre" (featuring Iggy Azalea) | Harris, Jr.; Amethyst Kelly; Dijon McFarlane; Mikely Adam | DJ Mustard | 3:22 |
| 8. | "Jet Fuel" (featuring Boosie Badazz) | Harris, Jr.; Torrence Hatch; Maurice Jordan; Anthony Tucker | The Beat Bully; Kenoe^{[co]} | 5:02 |
| 9. | "Paperwork" (featuring Pharrell) | Harris, Jr.; P. Williams | P. Williams | 3:39 |
| 10. | "Stay" (featuring Victoria Monét) | Harris, Jr.; Monet; T. Brown; Thomas Lumpkins | TBHits | 3:49 |
| 11. | "About My Issue" (featuring Victoria Monét and Nipsey Hussle) | Harris, Jr.; Monet; Ermias Asghedom; Aldrin Davis; Lamont Dozier | DJ Toomp | 4:24 |
| 12. | "At Ya Own Risk" (featuring Usher) | Harris, Jr.; Edwards; Cox, Jr.; Groover; Usher Raymond IV | Mars of 1500 or Nothin' | 4:28 |
| 13. | "On Doe, On Phil" (featuring Trae tha Truth) | Harris, Jr.; Frazier Thompson; Davis | DJ Toomp | 5:24 |
| 14. | "Light 'Em Up (RIP Doe B)" (featuring Pharrell and Watch The Duck) | Harris, Jr.; P. Williams; Jesse Rankins; Eddie Smith III; Jonathan Wells | P. Williams | 3:40 |
| 15. | "Let Your Heart Go (Break My Soul)" (featuring The-Dream) | Harris, Jr.; Terius Nash; Christopher "Tricky" Stewart | Stewart; The-Dream | 4:22 |
| Total length: | | | | 62:31 |

Deluxe edition bonus tracks
| No. | Title | Writer(s) | Producer(s) | Length |
|---|---|---|---|---|
| 16. | "Sugar Cane" | Harris, Jr.; L. Harris; Joseph; Justin Leary; Brian Taylor | Sak Pase; Ace Harris | 3:41 |
| 17. | "I Don't Know" | Harris, Jr.; Jordan | Kenoe | 4:12 |
| 18. | "You Can Tell How I Walk" (featuring Rick Ross) | Harris, Jr.; William Roberts II; Steve Samson; Jaswinder Singh | Samson; Jazzfeezy ^{[co]} | 4:06 |
| Total length: | | | | 74:30 |

Japanese edition bonus track
| No. | Title | Writer(s) | Producer(s) | Length |
|---|---|---|---|---|
| 19. | "Turn It" | Harris, Jr.; Aldrin Davis | DJ Toomp | 3:28 |
| Total length: | | | | 77:58 |

- ^[co] denotes co-producer.

== Personnel ==
Credits for Paperwork adapted from AllMusic.

- Mikely Adam – producer
- Amy – production coordination
- Iggy Azalea – featured artist
- Boosie Badazz – featured artist
- Chris Brown – featured artist
- Tommy "TBHITS" Brown – bass, drums, engineer, keyboards, producer, strings, synthesizer
- Marshall Bryant – engineer
- The Beat Bully – producer
- JD Butler – mixing assistant
- Dustin Capulong – mixing assistant
- Elliot Carter – engineer, mixing
- Andrew Coleman – arranger, digital editing, engineer
- Junior Coleto – assistant engineer, mixing assistant
- Michael Cox, Jr. – producer
- Thomas Cullison – assistant engineer
- Anthony Garner – arranger
- Aldrin Davis – instrumentation, producer
- Jacob Dennis – assistant engineer
- Matthew Desrameaux – assistant engineer
- The-Dream – featured artist
- Josh Drucker – mixing assistant
- Lamar Edwards – engineer, instrumentation, keyboards, producer
- Dernst "D'Mile" Emile II – bass, drums, keyboards, producer, strings, synthesizer
- Christopher Feldmann – art direction, design
- The MarTian SMG (Marvin E. Haskins) – graphic design and cover artwork.
- Bernard Freeman
- Alana Frye – mixing assistant
- John Frye – mixing
- Chris Gehringer – mastering
- Godz of Analog – producer
- Skylar Grey – featured artist
- Mick Guzauski – mixing
- Brandon Harding – assistant engineer
- Clifford Harris, Jr.
- Lasanna "Ace" Harris – producer, programming
- Femio Hernández – mixing assistant
- Shawn Holiday – A&R
- London Holmes – producer
- John Horesco IV – mastering
- Todd Hurtt – assistant engineer
- Nipsey Hussle – featured artist
- Jeezy – featured artist
- Sham "Sak Pase" Joseph – producer
- Shama Joseph – keyboards
- Ke'Noe – producer
- Keke – production coordination
- Keys – producer
- Mike Larson – arranger, digital editing, engineer, mixing
- Jordan Lewis – engineer
- Dijon McFarlane – producer
- Raphael Mesquita – mixing assistant
- James Minchin – photography
- Victoria Monet – featured artist
- Terius "The-Dream" Nash – featured artist, producer, programming, sequencing
- Tommy Parker – bass, drums, keyboards, producer, strings, synthesizer
- April Pope – marketing
- Tony Rey – engineer
- Gelareh Rouzbehani – A&R
- James Royo – mixing
- Gennaro Schiano – assistant engineer
- Bart Schoudel – engineer
- Ray Seay – mixing
- Ben Sedano – assistant engineer, mixing assistant
- Derrick Selby – engineer
- Eddie Smith III – programming
- Brian Springer – engineer
- Christopher "Tricky" Stewart – producer, programming, sequencing
- Brian Sumner – engineer
- T.I. – primary artist
- Trae Tha Truth – featured artist
- Alex Tumay – assistant engineer
- Usher – featured artist
- Nick Valentin – assistant engineer, mixing assistant
- Miles Walker – mixing
- Watch The Duck – featured artist
- Daniel Watson – engineer
- Pharrell Williams – executive producer, featured artist, producer
- Andrew Wuepper – mixing
- Jeezy – featured artist
- Young Thug – featured artist

== Charts ==
=== Weekly charts ===
| Chart (2014) | Peak position |
|---|---|
| Australian Albums (ARIA) | 43 |
| Australian Urban Albums (ARIA) | 3 |
| Canadian Albums (Billboard) | 19 |
| French Albums (SNEP) | 106 |
| Scottish Albums (Official Charts) | 94 |
| Swiss Albums (Schweizer Hitparade) | 64 |
| UK Albums (Official Charts) | 85 |
| UK Album Downloads (Official Charts) | 50 |
| UK R&B Albums (Official Charts) | 4 |
| US Billboard 200 | 2 |
| US Top R&B/Hip-Hop Albums (Billboard) | 1 |

=== Year-end charts ===
| Chart (2014) | Position |
|---|---|
| US Billboard 200 | 149 |
| US Top R&B/Hip-Hop Albums (Billboard) | 33 |
| Chart (2015) | Position |
| US Top R&B/Hip-Hop Albums (Billboard) | 47 |
