= Frank Cooper III =

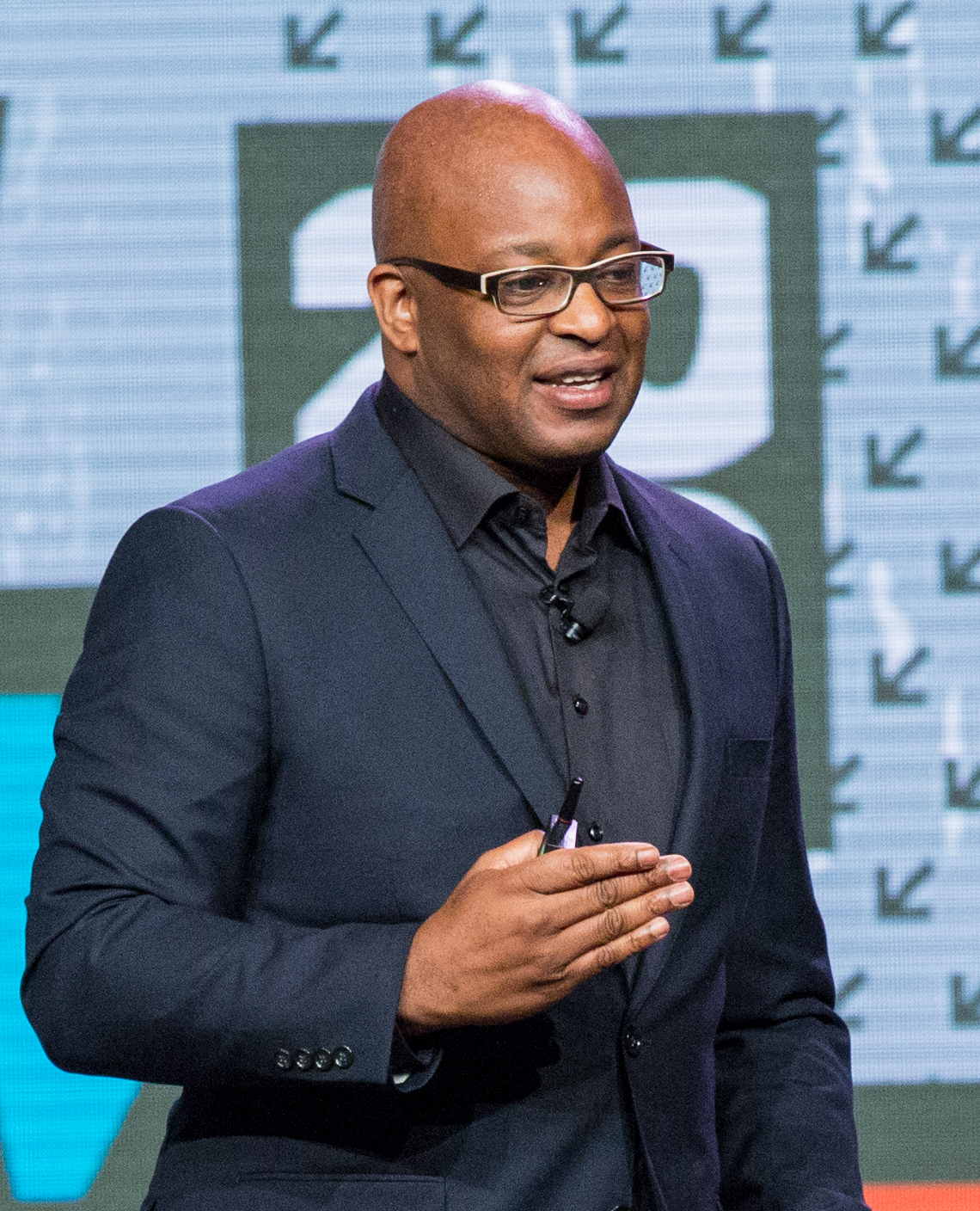
- Cooper in 2016
- Born: 1964 or 1965 (age 61–62)
- Education: University of California, Berkeley; Harvard Law School
- Occupation: Chief Marketing Officer
- Employer(s): Visa; BlackRock; BuzzFeed; PepsiCo; AOL; Motown; Def Jam Recordings

Frank Cooper III is a business executive, branded entertainment leader and current chief marketing officer for Visa. Cooper was earlier CMO of BlackRock, CMO and chief creative officer of BuzzFeed and served as CMO of global consumer engagement for PepsiCo.

== Career ==
After receiving a Bachelor of Science degree in business administration from the University of California at Berkeley, Cooper received his Juris Doctor from Harvard Law School where he served as Supreme Court Editor of the Harvard Law Review.

In 1998 Cooper co-founded the largest Internet company focused on urban lifestyle and minority markets, Urban Box Office Networks, Inc (UBO). Prior to UBO he served as a senior business affairs executive for two iconic brands in urban music: Motown Records and Def Jam Recordings. From 2001-2003, Cooper served as Vice President of Interactive Marketing at America Online, Inc, where he managed music sales and marketing programs.

=== Marketing strategy ===
As Chief Marketing Officer of Global Consumer Engagement for PepsiCo from 2010 - 2015, Cooper was charged with leading brand marketing strategy, brand development, and brand activation for global platforms across all beverages, including SoBe and Aquafina. In addition to leading the development of the consumer engagement model, Cooper led Global Media, Global Entertainment and Digital Engagement. Working with partners to produce branded content was part of Cooper's strategy to engage consumers on their terms, such as entering conversations on social media and by developing content. In the capacity of Chief Marketing Officer, he has served as the lead negotiator on PepsiCo's renewal of a multibillion-dollar deal with the NFL and led the negotiations and creative development of Pepsi's partnership with the hit television show The X Factor.

From 2008 – 2010, Cooper served as Chief Marketing Officer for Sparkling Beverages for Pepsi-Cola North America (PCNA), where he oversaw PepsiCo's entire soft drink portfolio. Cooper led the re-launch of trademark Pepsi, positioning the brand around the idea of optimism and positive change. From the Word Play advertisements, to the Webby Award-winning Dear Mr. President, to the Pepsi Throwback product, to the Pepsi Refresh Project, the re-launch was widely recognized as one of the most innovative and effective initiatives by PepsiCo in years.

=== Developing digital presence ===
He also expanded the company's digital presence through exclusive partnerships (e.g., Foursquare, Twitter), original content development, and real-time marketing. Working with the Cornerstone agency, he launched Green Label Sound (a music services label for indie artists connected to the Mountain Dew brand), as well as spearheaded partnership deals with Beyoncé, Michael Jackson, Eminem, One Direction, Nicki Minaj, Lil Wayne, Apple, Twitter, among others.

Cooper also spearheaded the most successful limited-time offering in Pepsi history, through a consumer-generated platform called DEWmocracy. Working closely with Forest Whitaker, he developed DEWmocracy as an online story-based game that allowed consumers to create the next Mountain Dew product. In a 12-week period, the limited-time offering yielded over 17 million cases worth approximately $100 million at retail.

In 2014, Cooper served as executive producer of Beats of the Beautiful Game a visual album consisting of 11 original songs/short films from top artists including Kelly Rowland, Janelle Monáe, Don Omar, Rita Ora and Spike Lee, Idris Elba, Diego Luna and others. It was the debut project to launch under Creators League – Pepsi's first-ever production company for original long and short-form digital content spearheaded by Cooper. Havard Cooper www.beatsofthebeautifulgame.com

Within PepsiCo, Cooper also worked as vice president of promotions and interactive marketing, supervising Pepsi-Cola North America's (PCNA) national and account-specific retail marketing efforts. He joined PCNA in July 2003 as vice president for multicultural marketing and strategic initiatives.

== Honors and awards ==
Cooper has been recognized as one of Fast Company's 100 Most Creative People in Business (#44), Advertising Age's Entertainment A-List, Billboard Power 100 (#13) and with the Ad Color Legend Award.

In 2014, Cooper was awarded Raymond J. McGuire Harvard University Alumni Award for Distinguished Professional Achievement.

== Memberships and Associations ==
Cooper formerly served as Chairman of the American Advertising Federation.
