= Private Show (T.I. song) =

Single by T.I. featuring Chris Brown

from the album Paperwork
- Released: February 24, 2015
- Genre: Dirty rap; R&B
- Length: 4:20
- Label: Grand Hustle; Columbia Records
- Songwriters: Clifford Harris, Jr.; Lasanna "Ace" Harris; Shama Joseph; Maurice "Verse" Simmonds; Chad Butler; Bernard Freeman
- Producers: Shama "Sak Pase" Josep; Ace Harris

T.I. singles chronology
"Waves" (Robin Schulz remix) (2014)	"Private Show" (2015)	"Don’t Make Me Wait" (remix) (2015)

Chris Brown singles chronology
"Bitches N Marijuana" (2015)	"Private Show" (2015)	"Five More Hours" (2015)

Music video
- "Private Show" on YouTube

"Private Show" is a song by American hip hop recording artist T.I., released on February 24, 2015, through Grand Hustle and Columbia Records, as the third single from his ninth studio album Paperwork (2014). The song, which was produced by Shama "Sak Pase" Joseph and Ace Harris, features vocals from American singer Chris Brown.

== Background ==
T.I. had previously collaborated with Chris Brown, on his 2010 single "Get Back Up". "Private Show" was sent to urban contemporary radio on February 24, 2015, as the third official single from Paperwork. On February 26, 2015, T.I. premiered the official single artwork on his Instagram and uploaded the official audio on YouTube.

== Music video ==
A music video for the song was released on May 11, 2015. It was directed by Emil Nava. Professional dancer Maxine Hupy posted her own routine set to the song on YouTube several months previously, and appears in the official video.

== Track listing ==
Digital download

1. "Private Show" (featuring Chris Brown; explicit) – 4:20
2. "Private Show" (featuring Chris Brown; clean) – 4:20

== Charts ==
Chart performance for "Private Show"
Chart (2015)	Peak position
US Bubbling Under Hot 100 (Billboard)	20
US Hot R&B/Hip-Hop Songs (Billboard)	42
US R&B/Hip-Hop Airplay (Billboard)	14
US Rhythmic Airplay (Billboard)	21
