= Rachel Assil =

- Born: Rachel Assil; Manhattan, New York City
- Genres: Pop, traditional pop
- Occupations: Singer, songwriter, music producer, pianist
- Instruments: Vocals, piano
- Years active: 1998–present
- Labels: Mosley Music Group, Zone 4
- Website: www.rachelassil.com

Rachel Assil (born September 20), is an American recording artist, songwriter, pianist and music producer from Manhattan, NY. In January 2014, super-producers Polow Da Don and Timbaland signed Assil to a record deal with Zone 4 and Mosley Music Group.

== Music career ==
Having received no formal training, Assil is a self-taught pianist and singer who began writing songs at the age of 8. At a music conference in 2008, Ray Daniels [now VP of A&R, Epic Records] heard Assil's music, prompting him to play it for Abou 'Bu' Thiam [now VP, Def Jam Records]. This led to Assil signing a deal with Akon's label Kon Live. As a mutual decision, their agreement eventually concluded without renewal.

Over the next few years, her work with Polow Da Don culminated with her record deal with Zone 4 and Mosley Music Group. Assil & Timbaland's first record 'Whoever We Are' was released internationally by Caroline Records, distributed by Capitol Records on June 9, 2014, as part of the Pepsi Beats of the Beautiful Game visual compilation album. A short film for 'Whoever We Are' was released on July 3, 2014.

== ASCAP ==
Assil has been immensely involved with ASCAP as a member, performer, speaker and advocate for songwriters.

In 2009 she was selected from hundreds of applicants to participate in the ASCAP Lester Sill Workshop. ASCAP has since featured her as one of their notable alumna, listed as a reason to apply for the workshop.

In September 2009, Assil was invited to perform at ASCAP's first annual 'Women Behind The Music' series in Hollywood, CA.

At the fifth annual ASCAP Expo in 2010, Linda Perry chose Assil to perform on stage as part of her featured Master Session. ASCAP's Erik Philbrook covered the performance, describing it as "something so beautiful and compelling, something that generated so much love, that my body heated up." Video of the performance was posted by ASCAP on their official YouTube page. She received a standing ovation, along with Perry's immediate feedback stating: "That was amazing, if anybody would tell you to change that they would be silly. You sold that completely because you feel it, and sometimes it's the emotion it's not the perfection, it's the emotion that gets delivered and that was perfect emotion so thank you for that. "

In 2011, ASCAP featured an article interviewing Assil about her independent debut 'The Opus Unplugged.'

In November 2013, accompanied by co-writer Jesse Macht, Assil performed for ASCAP President Paul Williams, Songwriter and ASCAP board member Marilyn Bergman and US Register of Copyrights Maria Pallante. Williams, Bergman and Pallante had been in the office to discuss the state of music copyright, and pivotal changes to the US Copyright Act in the coming months and years.

In July 2014, Assil was invited to speak on a panel titled 'Independent Women: Exploring DIY Tactics and Success Without a Team.' It was held at the SAE Institute in Hollywood and attended by students, songwriters, producers and engineers.

== Discography ==
=== Pepsi Beats of the Beautiful Game ===
Assil & Timbaland's debut record ‘Whoever We Are’ was released internationally on June 9, 2014, as part of the Pepsi Beats of the Beautiful Game visual compilation album. A short film for ‘Whoever We Are’ was released on July 3, 2014, directed by the Kolton Brothers. In addition to digital radio airplay in several foreign markets, the video amassed over one million views in the first week of its release.

Pepsi writer and media-producer Dana Droppo described the track as "quintessential Timbaland, combining heavy-bass, synth compliments and an attention-grabbing hook in a tightly produced track that soars on first listen." In an interview with MTV, Timbaland described the early stages of placing the song on the project "I felt like I had a great song with my new artist Rachel Assil that fit perfectly.. I heard the song when Rachel did it, she played it on the piano and I just thought, 'Wow, this fits the campaign'. I sent it to Pepsi and they loved it."

==== Track listing ====
| No. | Title | Writer(s) | Performer(s) | Length |
|---|---|---|---|---|
| 8. | "Whoever We Are" | Rachel Assil; Sandy Chila; Timothy Mosley | Timbaland featuring Rachel Assil | 3:18 |

=== Release history ===
| Region | Date | Format | Label |
|---|---|---|---|
| Worldwide | June 9, 2014 | Standard edition (digital) | Caroline Records |
| United States | June 10, 2014 | Standard edition (digital) | Caroline Records |

=== The Opus Unplugged ===
Released internationally in September 2011 The Opus Unplugged marked Assil's independent debut release. The album was recorded at Studio X in The Palms Casino Resort. The album release at The Roxy Theater was covered by The Recording Academy in an exclusive interview held at the Grammy headquarters in Santa Monica. Friend and super-producer Just Blaze weighed in on the project, describing Assil's music as "Truth, passion, soul, joy, pain, honesty, conviction, drive, determination.. Rachel Assil embodies all of these things in her music and you can feel it in every key she graces and every note she sings."

==== Track listing ====
| No. | Title | Writer(s) | Producer(s) | Length |
|---|---|---|---|---|
| 1. | "Chasing Shadows" | Rachel Assil | Rachel Assil | 3:47 |
| 2. | "Cold Cold Coma" | Assil | Assil | 3:16 |
| 3. | "Missing Your Love" | Assil | Assil | 5:11 |
| 4. | "It Doesn't Matter" | Assil | Assil | 5:50 |
| 5. | "Salt Water" | Assil | Assil | 6:00 |
| 6. | "Lover" | Assil | Assil | 5:25 |
| 7. | "Cold Cold Coma II" | Assil | Assil | 1:37 |
| 8. | "Disappear" | Assil | Assil | 4:17 |
| 9. | "Disappear II" | Assil | Assil | 4:39 |
| 10. | "Call It Even" | Assil | Assil | 3:55 |
| 11. | "Permanent Scar" | Assil; Harold Lilly | Assil | 4:36 |
| 12. | "Stay With Me" | Assil | Assil | 3:47 |
| 13. | "Call It Even II" | Assil | Assil | 1:55 |
| 14. | "Falter" | Assil; Chris Lloyd | Assil | 7:34 |
| Total length: | | | | 61:49 |
