= No Mediocre =

Single by T.I. featuring Iggy Azalea

from the album Paperwork
- Released: June 17, 2014
- Genre: Hip hop; tropical music
- Length: 3:21
- Label: Grand Hustle; Columbia Records
- Songwriters: Clifford Harris, Jr.; Amethyst Kelly
- Producer: DJ Mustard

T.I. singles chronology
"About the Money" (2014)	"No Mediocre" (2014)	"This Girl" (2014)

Iggy Azalea singles chronology
"Problem" (2014)	"No Mediocre" (2014)	"Black Widow" (2014)

Music video
- "No Mediocre on YouTube

"No Mediocre" is a song by American rapper T.I., released on June 17, 2014, through Grand Hustle and Columbia Records, as the lead single from his ninth studio album Paperwork (2014). It is a hip hop song, produced by DJ Mustard, and it features a guest appearance from Grand Hustle protégé, Australian rapper Iggy Azalea. It is the second collaboration between Azalea and T.I. after the former's third single from her debut album The New Classic, 'Change Your Life'. The latter appears equally in the "Black Widow"'s music video.

== Background ==
On November 22, 2013, T.I. announced that he had signed a deal with Columbia Records, to release his upcoming ninth studio album. T.I. revealed he recruited Pharrell Williams to executive produce the LP and planned to release the album in early 2014. Originally, T.I. had planned to release Trouble Man II: He Who Wears the Crown, a sequel to his 2012 album, but since getting into the studio with the album's executive producer, Pharrell Williams, he changed his mind. He stated: "Since we started working on the project and the project started has taken a different shape, I think we're going to postpone that title. We're gonna rework that. I got a couple of things in mind." While he still planned to release the sequel to Trouble Man, he said about the current project:

All I'ma say is, it's gonna be a motion picture, it's gonna be a theatrical-worthy title. Something that will definitely seem instant classic. I'm thinking something like "Trap Champion", "Paperwork", but whatever it is the subtitle will be "The Motion Picture".

On December 16, 2013, it was reported that T.I. decided to name it Paperwork. On June 17, 2014, T.I. released "No Mediocre", as the official lead single from Paperwork, which features his protégé Iggy Azalea and was produced by West Coast hip hop producer DJ Mustard. T.I. talked about the track on MTV News saying: "For me I think it was something to uplift women. It's a get-your-sh—together-type of-record". He explained:

It's denouncing mediocrity, man; all things sub-standard or below average or even moderately average should be set aside, man, and I think it starts internally. You must first have confidence and security within yourself, it goes from the heart, to the mind and then it is conveyed through your actions and your presentation of yourself.

He continued stating that men do not just look at physical attributes, but "social qualities" as well, and deep down "Every person knows what their strengths are, so showcase your strengths and not your weaknesses so much." He later added, "I wanted one of those records that wasn't really really serious and a whole lot of thought-provoking messages behind it. I just wanted it to be something that women could dance to, that could be a club record, just get on the radio for urban as well as rhythmic, and something that didn't require a lot of thought, you know what I'm saying? A fun record."

== Commercial performance ==
The song debuted at number 58 on the US Billboard Hot 100 chart and peaked at number 33. It was certified Platinum by the Recording Industry Association of America on March 5, 2015. It also reached number one on Mediabase's Rhythmic top 40 chart. On January 28, 2015, "No Mediocre" was certified Gold in Canada after peaking at number 59 on the Canadian Hot 100. The song became T.I.'s first U.S. platinum song as a lead artist in 6 years following his 2009 single "Dead and Gone".

== Music video ==
The music video for the song was shot in late May 2014 in Rio de Janeiro, Brazil, and premiered June 18, 2014, on MTV and VH1, and was later available on VEVO. Directed by Director X, the visuals begin with T.I. in the Tavares Bastos favela and making his way through the village, playing a quick game of football before heading to his home, where some exotic-looking women await him. He then meets up with Azalea, as she dances alongside T.I. at an outdoor party. It was named one of the sexiest videos of 2014 by VH1. UK singer and actress Montana Manning appears in the video. In France, the music video was broadcast after 10.p.m following suggestive content.

On January 30, 2020, the music for the song passed 300 million views on YouTube. With this milestone, it became T.I.'s second and Azalea's sixth video, respectively, to cross the 300 million view milestone.

== Live performances ==
T.I. and Azalea performed "No Mediocre" for the first time at the BET Awards 2014 at the Nokia Theatre L.A. Live on June 29.

In October 2014, T.I. performed the song alone on the Queen Latifah Show. Both T.I. and Azalea have regularly performed No Mediocre at their individual concerts.

== Track listing ==
Digital download

1. "No Mediocre (featuring Iggy Azalea)" [Explicit] – 3:21
2. "No Mediocre (featuring Iggy Azalea)" [Clean] – 3:21

== Charts ==
=== Weekly charts ===
Chart (2014)	Peak position
Australia (ARIA)	36
Australian Urban (ARIA)	6
Belgium (Ultratip Bubbling Under Flanders)	19
Belgium (Ultratip Bubbling Under Wallonia)	13
Belgium Urban (Ultratop Flanders)	16
Canada Hot 100 (Billboard)	59
France (SNEP)	35
Germany (Deutsche Black Charts)	1
New Zealand (Recorded Music NZ)	34
UK Singles (Official Charts)	49
UK Hip Hop/R&B (Official Charts)	6
US Billboard Hot 100	33
US Hot R&B/Hip-Hop Songs (Billboard)	8
US Rhythmic Airplay (Billboard)	2

=== Year-end charts ===
Chart (2014)	Position
Australian Urban (ARIA)	30
Belgium Urban (Ultratop Flanders)	58
Germany (Deutsche Black Charts)	4
US Billboard Hot 100	87
US Hot R&B/Hip-Hop Songs (Billboard)	23
US Rhythmic Songs (Billboard)	16

== Certifications ==
Region	Certification	Certified units/sales
Australia (ARIA)	Gold	35,000^{^}
Canada (Music Canada)	Gold	40,000^{*}
New Zealand (RMNZ)	Platinum	30,000^{‡}
United States (RIAA)	Platinum	1,000,000^{‡}
^{*} Sales figures based on certification alone.^{^} Shipments figures based on certification alone.^{‡} Sales+streaming figures based on certification alone.

== Release history ==
Country	Date	Format	Label
United States	June 17, 2014	Digital download	Grand Hustle Records; Columbia Records
United States	June 17, 2014	Mainstream urban radio	Grand Hustle Records; Columbia Records
United States	July 1, 2014	Rhythmic contemporary radio	Grand Hustle Records; Columbia Records
United Kingdom	August 17, 2014	Digital download	Grand Hustle Records; Columbia Records
United States	September 23, 2014	Mainstream airplay	Grand Hustle Records; Columbia Records
