= Bu Thiam =

American record executive

Abou "Bu" Thiam is an American record executive. He is the brother of Senegalese-American singer Akon.

Thiam managed Kanye West from 2020 until February 2022.

In April 2022, Thiam joined Columbia Records as executive vice president.

In February 2025, Thiam formed a partnership between his BuVision label and Atlantic Music Group which will have his artists released and marketed through Atlantic.

== BuVision ==
BuVision
- Founded: 2011
- Distributor: Atlantic Records (2025–present)
- Location: Los Angeles, U.S.

BuVision is an American record label and talent management company founded by Thiam in 2011.
