= Eric Benét discography =

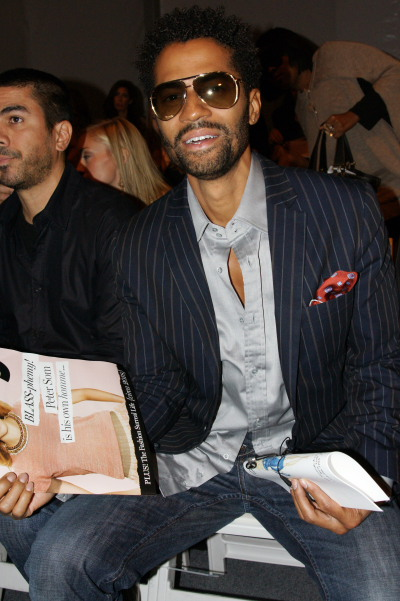
- Benét in 2008
- Studio albums: 10
- EPs: 1
- Singles: 22

American singer Eric Benét has released nine studio albums, one extended play, and more than twenty-two singles. After the breakup of the duo Benét, which consisted of Benét and his sister Lisa and released a self-titled album in 1992, Eric signed a solo recording contract with Warner Bros. Records. In 1996, the label released his solo debut True to Myself. Largely co-produced by Demonté Posey and George Nash, it reached the top 40 on the US Top R&B/Hip-Hop Albums and sold just under 300,000 copies domestically. "Femininity," the album's third single, peaked at number 24 on the US Hot R&B/Hip-Hop Songs chart.

A Day in the Life, Benét's second album was released in April 1999. Largely improving on the success of its predecessor, it peaked at number 25 on the US Billboard 200, while also reaching the top ten of the Top R&B/Hip-Hop Albums chart. Eventually earning a Gold certification from the Recording Industry Association of America (RIAA), it sold close to 900,000 units in the United States. Lead single "Georgy Porgy," a cover of the 1978 Toto song and duet with Faith Evans, peaked at number two on the New Zealand Singles Chart. Follow-up "Spend My Life with You" with Tamia became his highest-charting single yet, reaching number one on the Hot R&B/Hip-Hop Songs chart, while also going Gold.

In 2001, Benét was expected to release his third studio album Better and Better on Warner Bros. but the label rejected the album due to creative differences, leading him to sign with Friday Records for next album Hurricane. Released in June 2005, it peaked at number 27 on the US Top R&B/Hip-Hop Albums chart. with lead single "I Wanna Be Loved" becoming a top 30 hit on the Hot R&B/Hip-Hop Songs chart. Benét achieved greater commercial success with his next album Love & Life, released in September 2008. Pushed by his second Adult R&B Songs number-one hit "You're the Only One," it peaked at number 11 on the Billboard 200 and number two on the Top R&B/Hip-Hop Albums chart.

In 2010, the singer released Lost in Time through Reprise Records. As with on Love & Life, he reteamed with Posey and Nash to work on the majority of the album. It reached number 33 on the Billboard 200 and produced the Benét's third chart topper on the Adult R&B Songs chart, "Sometimes I Cry." In 2012, Benét released his sixth studio album The One through his own label Jordan House Records in partnership with Primary Wave. It reached number 32 on the Billboard 200 and became his fourth top ten album on the US Top R&B/Hip-Hop Albums chart, selling 70,000 copies domestically. Building on the success of his previous two albums in Asia, Benét recorded his seventh studio album From E to U: Volume 1, a cover album, specifically for the Asian market. Co-Produced by Posey, it reached number 24 on the Circle Albums Chart in South Korea and was later made available worldwide on streaming services such as Spotify.

Benét's self-titled eighth album was released through Jordan House and BMG Rights Management in October 2016. It opened and peaked at number 12 on the Top R&B/Hip-Hop Albums chart, and produced two top ten singles on the US Adult R&B Songs chart, including the number-two hit "Sunshine." After a longer break from the music industry, Benét began compiling his next project under the JBR Creative Group, his latest label. Urged to record a duets project, he produced and released Duets, a five-track EP that comprises duets with female singers, in August 2024. Its first two singles "Something We Can Make Love to" with Tamar Braxton and "So Distracted" with Chanté Moore both became number-one hits on the Adult R&B Songs chart. The Co-Star, Benét's ninth album and a continuation of Duets, was released on June 6, 2025. Also in 2025, Benét released It's Christmas, his first Christmas album through JBR Creative Group.

== Albums ==
=== Studio albums ===
List of studio albums, with selected chart positions, sales figures and certifications
Title	Album details	Peak chart positions						Sales	Certifications
Title	Album details	US	US R&B /HH	JPN	KOR	NLD	UK	Sales	Certifications
True to Myself	Released: September 24, 1996; Label: Warner Bros.; Formats: cassette, CD	174	38	—	—	—	—	US: 295,000	
A Day in the Life	Released: April 27, 1999; Label: Warner Bros.; Format: CD, digital download	25	6	—	—	81	67	US: 897,000	RIAA: Gold
Hurricane	Released: June 21, 2005; Label: Friday, Reprise; Format: CD, digital download	133	27	—	—	—	—	US: 170,000	
Love & Life	Released: September 9, 2008; Label: Friday, Reprise; Format: CD, digital download	11	2	119	—	—	—	UK: 2,569	
Lost in Time	Released: November 30, 2010; Label: Reprise; Format: CD, digital download	33	8	149	27	—	—	KOR: 971 (Note: Cumulative sales of Lost in Time in South Korea: 2011.01 Month: 452; 2011.03 Month: 519)	
The One	Released June 5, 2012; Label: Jordan House, EMI; Format: CD, digital download	32	5	116	30	—	—	US: 69,483; KOR: 1,193	
From E to U: Volume 1	Released: May 28, 2014; Label: Jordan House, Warner; Format: CD, digital download	—	—	119	34	—	—	KOR: 458	
Eric Benét	Released: October 7, 2016; Label: Jordan House; Format: CD, digital download	—	12	—	—	—	—		
The Co-Star	Released: June 6, 2025; Label: JBR Creative Group; Format: CD, digital download	—	—	—	—	—	—		
It's Christmas	Released: October 10, 2025; Label: JBR Creative Group; Format: CD, digital download	—	—	—	—	—	—		

=== Extended plays ===
Title	Album details
Duets	Released: August 23, 2024; Label: JBR Creative Group; Formats: Download, streaming

== Singles ==
List of singles, with selected chart positions and sales
Title	Year	Peak chart positions										Sales	Certifications	Album
Title	Year	US	US R&B /HH	FRA	GER	JPN	KOR	KOR Intl.	NLD	NZ	UK	Sales	Certifications	Album
"Let's Stay Together"	1996	—	45	—	—	—	—	—	—	—	—			True to Myself
"Spiritual Thang"	1996	—	41	—	—	—	—	—	—	—	62			True to Myself
"Femininity"	1997	— (Note: "Femininity" did not enter the US Billboard Hot 100, but peaked at number 7 on the US Bubbling Under Hot 100 chart.)	24	—	—	—	—	—	—	—	—			True to Myself
"True to Myself"	1997	— (Note: "True to Myself" did not enter the US Billboard Hot 100, but peaked at number 22 on the US Bubbling Under Hot 100 chart.)	43	—	—	—	—	—	—	—	80			True to Myself
"Georgy Porgy" (featuring Faith Evans)	1999	55	15	40	82	—	—	—	33	2	28			A Day in the Life
"Spend My Life with You" (featuring Tamia)	1999	21	1	—	—	—	—	37	—	—	—	US: 500,000; KOR: 2,256	RIAA: Gold; RMNZ: Gold	A Day in the Life
"When You Think of Me"	2000	—	46	—	—	—	—	—	—	—	—			A Day in the Life
"Why You Follow Me"	2000	—	—	—	—	—	—	—	—	—	48			A Day in the Life
"Love Don't Love Me"	2001	— (Note: "Love Don't Love Me" did not enter the US Billboard Hot 100, but peaked at number 19 on the US Bubbling Under Hot 100 chart.)	38	—	—	—	—	—	—	—	—			The Brothers: Music from the Motion Picture
"I Wanna Be Loved"	2005	— (Note: "I Wanna Be Loved" did not enter the US Billboard Hot 100, but peaked at number 5 on the US Bubbling Under Hot 100 chart.)	28	—	—	—	—	—	—	—	—			Hurricane
"Hurricane"	2005	—	—	—	—	—	—	88	—	—	—			Hurricane
"Where Does the Love Go" (with Yvonne Catterfeld)	2006	—	—	—	28	—	—	—	—	—	—			Hurricane
"Pretty Baby"	2006	—	44	—	—	—	—	—	—	—	—			Hurricane
"You're the Only One"	2008	— (Note: "You're the Only One" did not enter the US Billboard Hot 100, but peaked at number 6 on the US Bubbling Under Hot 100 chart.)	17	—	—	—	—	—	—	—	—			Love & Life
"The Hunger"	2008	—	49	—	—	—	—	—	—	—	—			Love & Life
"Chocolate Legs"	2009	—	36	—	—	—	82	16	—	—	—			Love & Life
"Sometimes I Cry"	2010	— (Note: "Sometimes I Cry" did not enter the US Billboard Hot 100, but peaked at number 6 on the US Bubbling Under Hot 100 chart.)	16	—	—	—	—	6	—	—	—	KOR: 102,129		Lost in Time
"Never Want to Live Without You"	2010	—	43	—	—	—	84	3	—	—	—	KOR: 148,369		Lost in Time
"Real Love"	2011	—	32	—	—	51	—	14	—	—	—	KOR: 63,735		The One
"Harriett Jones"	2012	—	46	—	—	—	—	7	—	—	—	KOR: 150,136		The One
"News For You"	2012	—	— (Note: "News For You" did not enter the US Hot R&B/Hip-Hop Songs chart but peaked at number 20 on the US Hot R&B Songs chart, number 22 on the US R&B/Hip-Hop Airplay chart and number 5 on the US Adult R&B Airplay chart.)	—	—	—	—	64	—	—	—	KOR: 10,114		The One
"Whoo!" (with Fiestar)	2013	—	—	—	—	—	58	—	—	—	—	KOR: 30,599		Non-album single
"Runnin'"	2014	—	— (Note: "Runnin'" did not enter the US Hot R&B/Hip-Hop Songs chart but peaked at number 43 on the US R&B/Hip-Hop Airplay chart and number 11 on the US Adult R&B Airplay chart.)	—	—	—	—	72	—	—	—	KOR: 6,177		The Other One
"Lay It Down"	2014	—	—	—	—	—	—	—	—	—	—			The Other One
"Almost Paradise" (with Ailee)	2014	—	—	—	—	—	—	7	—	—	—	KOR: 24,568		From E to U: Volume 1
"After the Love Has Gone"	2014	—	—	—	—	—	—	7	—	—	—	KOR: 25,840		From E to U: Volume 1
"Did We Really Love?" (정말 사랑했을까)	2016	—	—	—	—	—	—	5	—	—	—	KOR: 32,745		Non-album single
"Sunshine"	2016	—	— (Note: "Sunshine" did not enter the US Hot R&B/Hip-Hop Songs] chart but peaked at number 27 on the US R&B/Hip-Hop Airplay chart and number 2 on the US Adult R&B Airplay chart.)	—	—	—	—	—	—	—	—			Eric Benét
"Insane"	2017	—	— (Note: "Insane" did not enter the US Hot R&B/Hip-Hop Songs chart but peaked at number 46 on the US R&B/Hip-Hop Airplay chart and number 10 on the US Adult R&B Airplay chart.)	—	—	—	—	—	—	—	—			Eric Benét
"Everything" (with Babylon)	2018	—	—	—	—	—	—	—	—	—	—			Non-album single
"Something We Can Make Love To" (with Tamar Braxton)	2024	—	— (Note: "Something We Can Make Love To" did not enter the US Hot R&B/Hip-Hop Songs chart but peaked at number 24 on the US Hot R&B Songs chart, number 14 on the US R&B/Hip-Hop Airplay chart and number 1 on the US Adult R&B Airplay chart.)	—	—	—	—	—	—	—	—			Duets EP
"So Distracted" (with Chanté Moore)	2024	—	— (Note: "So Distracted" did not enter the US Hot R&B/Hip-Hop Songs chart but peaked at number 17 on the US R&B/Hip-Hop Airplay chart and number 1 on the US Adult R&B Airplay chart.)	—	—	—	—	—	—	—	—			Duets EP
"Can't Wait" (with Keri Hilson)	2025	—	—	—	—	—	—	—	—	—	—			The Co-Star
"Must Be Love" (with India Arie)	2025	—	— (Note: "So Distracted" did not enter the US Hot R&B/Hip-Hop Songs chart but peaked at number 34 on the US R&B/Hip-Hop Airplay chart and number 7 on the US Adult R&B Airplay chart.)	—	—	—	—	—	—	—	—			The Co-Star

== Other charted songs ==
List of singles, with selected chart positions and sales
Title	Year	Peak chart positions			Sales	Album
Title	Year	US Jazz	US R&B /HH	KOR Intl.	Sales	Album
"The Last Time"	2005	—	—	68		Hurricane
"Still With You"	2005	—	—	41	KOR: 246,598 (Note: Cumulative sales of "Still With You" in South Korea: 2010: 77,468; 2013: 52,920; 2014 (Month 8): 11,608; 2014 (Month 9): 11,461; 2014 (Month 10): 9,179; 2014 (Month 11): 9,065; 2014 (Month 12): 13,983; 2015 (Month 1): 10,955; 2015 (Month 2): 8,292; 2015 (Month 3): 10,963; 2015 (Month 4): 10,004; 2015 (Month 5): 9,782; 2015 (Month 11): 10,918)	Hurricane
"Feel Good" (featuring Faith Evans)	2010	—	—	60		Lost in Time
"Always a Reason"	2010	—	—	81		Lost in Time
"Summer Love" (featuring India Benet)	2010	—	—	94		Lost in Time
"Lost in Time"	2010	—	—	95		Lost in Time
"Trippin'"	2011	—	—	8	KOR: 96,950 (Note: Cumulative sales of "Trippin'" in South Korea: 2011 (Month 3): 43,392; 2011 (Month 4): 36,208; 2011 (Month 5): 17,350)	Lost in Time (Korea Tour Edition)
"Redbone Girl"	2012	—	— (Note: "Redbone Girl" did not enter the US Hot R&B/Hip-Hop Songs chart but peaked at number 38 on the US Adult R&B Airplay chart.)	61	KOR: 10,717 (Note: Cumulative sales of "Redbone Girl" in South Korea: 2012 Weeks 19: 6,841; 2012 Weeks 20: 3,876)	The One
"Muzik"	2012	—	—	78	KOR: 5,957	The One
"Waitin'"	2012	—	—	80	KOR: 5,841	The One
"Gonna Be My Girl"	2012	—	—	85	KOR: 5,677	The One
"Hope That It's You"	2012	—	—	89	KOR: 5,608	The One
"Here In My Arms (Lucia's Lullaby)"	2012	—	—	98	KOR: 5,449	The One
"More Than Words"	2014	—	—	86	KOR: 3,071	From E to U: Volume 1
"All You Need Is Love" (Dave Koz and Friends)	2014	4	—	—		The 25th of December

== Other appearances ==
Title	Year	Artist(s)	Album
"Say Love"	1994	Jeff Lorber	West Side Stories
"Act Like You Want It"	1997	Somethin' for the People	This Time It's Personal
"Day Dreaming"	1999	David Sanborn	Inside
"When I'm With You"	1999	David Sanborn	Inside
"I Apologize"	2000	Somethin' for the People	Issues
"Want You"	2001	Mariah Carey	Glitter
"Beautiful Lover"	2005	Big Gipp	Beautiful Lover
"Days & Nights"	2013	JeA (Brown Eyed Girls)	Just JeA
"This Christmas"	2014	Dave Koz	Dave Koz & Friends: The 25th Of December
"All You Need Is Love"	2014	Dave Koz, Johnny Mathis, Heather Headley, Richard Marx and Jona	Dave Koz & Friends: The 25th Of December
