= Hurricane (Eric Benét album) =

Studio album by Eric Benét
- Released: June 21, 2005
- Length: 59:49
- Labels: Friday; Reprise
- Producers: Walter Afanasieff; Eric Benét; Michael Carney; Hod David; Drew and Shannon; Andy Duncan; David Foster; Humberto Gatica; George Nash, Jr.; Demonté Posey

Eric Benét chronology
A Day in the Life (1999)	Hurricane (2005)	Love & Life (2008)

Singles from Hurricane
- 1. "I Wanna Be Loved" Released: May 10, 2005; 2. "Hurricane" Released: 2005; 3. "Pretty Baby" Released: June 6, 2006

Hurricane is the third studio album by American R&B recording artist Eric Benét. It was released on June 21, 2005, on Friday Records, with distributing by Reprise Records. It is the follow-up to his second album A Day in the Life (1999) and follows the shelving of his Better and Better project for Warner Bros. Records. Recorded at various recording studios, the album was written and produced by Benét with several other producers, including Walter Afanasieff, Michael Carney, Hod David, David Foster, George Nash, Jr., and Demonté Posey.

== Background ==
In 2001, Benét was expected to release his third studio album Better and Better on Warner Bros. Records but the label rejected the album due to creative differences. Due to these conflicts, Benét signed to Reprise-distributed label Friday Records and began recording his next album Hurricane. Several songs from Better and Better reappeared on other studio albums by Benét: "I Wanna Be Loved" and "Pretty Baby" were released on Hurricane. The songs "Spanish Fly" and "Sing to Me" would later appear on his 2008 album Love & Life. The title track "Better & Better" would later be re-recorded by Lalah Hathaway for her 2004 album Outrun the Sky, while "Better and Better" and "Trippin" would later be included as an iTunes bonus track on Benét's 2010 album Lost in Time.

== Recording ==
Recording sessions for the album took place at various recording locations, including the Hit Factory in New York, New York, Bowery Digital, Chalice Studios, Ocean Way Recording, The Studio, Warner Bros. Sound Stage, and Westlake Audio in Los Angeles, California, Chartmaker Studios, Drew's Groove Studios, Panic Room, and Soundstage Studio in Nashville, Tennessee, Jade Studios and Jupiter Studios in Franklin, Tennessee, and Eastman Scoring Stage in Burbank, California. Production was handled by Benét and several other record producers, including Walter Afanasieff, Michael Carney, Hod David, Dave Foster, George Nash, Jr., and Demonté Posey.

== Composition ==
Hurricane incorporates musical elements of gospel and contributions from jazz musicians Roy Hargrove, Chris Botti, and Viktor Krauss. A departure from the jazzy, groove-based urban sound of Benét's previous work, the album features an adult contemporary radio format style, with sweeping strings, layered vocals, and nimble acoustic guitars. Rashod D. Ollison of The Baltimore Sun likened Hurricane to Christopher Cross rather than R. Kelly.

== Reception ==
Professional ratings
Review scores
Source	Rating
AllMusic	3.5/5 stars
Blender	2/5 stars
Mojo	3/5 stars
Vibe	2.5/5 stars

AllMusic writer Stephen Thomas Erlewine commented that "The quiet storm is well performed but dull, yet the Prince-styled numbers are engaging, melodic, and nimble, strong showcases for Benet's mellow skills". Mojo gave the album three out of five stars and called it "a very palatable collection of self-penned confessional songs". Laura Checkoway of Vibe called it "an uneven mix of simplistic sentimentality", stating "Reflective and repentant at times, Hurricane is more likely to sing you to sleep than knock you off your feet". The Washington Post commented favorably on the album's themes of "healing and redemption", and stated "The spiritual tone often brings out the best in [Eric Benet]'s supple tenor on 'In The End' and other tracks".

== Track listing ==
No.	Title	Writer(s)	Producer(s)	Length
1.	"Be Myself Again"	Eric Benét; Hod David; Andrew Wyatt	Benét; David	3:21
2.	"Pretty Baby"	Benét; George Nash, Jr.; Demonté Posey	Benét; Nash; Posey	4:56
3.	"Hurricane"	Benét; David Foster	Foster; Humberto Gatica	4:40
4.	"Where Does the Love Go"	Benét; David; Wyatt	David	4:13
5.	"My Prayer"	Walter Afanasieff; Benét; John Lang; Jud Mahoney	Afanasieff	5:09
6.	"Man Enough to Cry"	Benét; Dean Parks	Foster; Gatica; Benét^{[a]}	4:13
7.	"I Know"	Benét; Drew Ramsey; Shannon Saunders	Drew and Shannon	3:43
8.	"India"	Benét; Parks; Danny Peck	Foster; Gatica	4:08
9.	"The Last Time"	Benét; Foster; Amy Foster-Gillies	Foster; Gatica; Benét^{[a]}	3:41
10.	"In the End"	Benét; Neal Larson; Linda Thompson	Foster; Gatica; Benét^{[a]}	3:43
11.	"Making Love"	Benét; Michael Carney; Andy Duncan	Benét; Carney; Duncan	4:23
12.	"Cracks of My Broken Heart"	Afanasieff; Benét; Tim Blixseth; Jonathan Clark	Afanasieff	4:36
13.	"I Wanna Be Loved"	Benét; Posey	Posey; Benét	4:38
14.	"Still with You"	Afanasieff; Benét; Blixseth	Afanasieff	4:40
Total length:				59:59

Notes

- ^{^[a]} denotes co-producer

== Personnel ==
Performers and musicians

- Spanky Alford – guitar, soloist
- Eric Benét – audio production, vocal bass, percussion, producer, vocals
- Chris Boardman – string arrangements
- Chris Botti – soloist, trumpet
- Randall Bowland – guitar
- David Campbell – string arrangements
- Vinnie Colaiuta – drums
- Larry Corbett – cello
- Nathan East – bass
- Larry Gold – string arrangements
- Anthony Johnson – drums
- Jef Lee Johnson – guitar
- Viktor Krauss – bass
- Frank Lacy – horn
- Michael Landau – electric guitar
- Lucia Micarelli – violin
- Brian Frazier Moore – drums
- Dan Needham – drums
- Pino Palladino – bass
- Dean Parks – guitar
- Van Dyke Parks – arranger, conductor
- Tim Pierce – guitar
- James Poyser – keyboards
- William Ross – arranger, conductor
- Jacques Schwarz-Bart – horn
- Norbert Stachel – alto and tenor saxophones

Technical

- Walter Afanasieff – arranger, audio production, keyboards, producer, programming
- Steve B. – engineer
- Tim Blixseth – executive producer
- Lee Bridges – assistant
- Michael Carney – audio production, producer
- Hod David – audio production, bass, drums, guitar, mixing, producer
- Kevin "KD" Davis – mixing
- Rich Davis – production coordination
- Neil Devor – engineer
- Andy Duncan – audio production, engineer, guitar, mixing, producer
- Danny Duncan – engineer
- Olivia Fischa – make-up
- David Foster – arranger, keyboards, producer, string arrangements
- Humberto Gatica – audio production, engineer, mixing, producer
- Bernie Grundman – mastering
- Dawn Haynes – stylist
- Kaori Kinoshita – assistant engineer
- Emanuel Kiriakou – digital editing, engineer, programming
- Manny Marroquin – mixing
- George Nash, Jr. – audio production, producer
- Mike O'Connor – engineer
- Juan Patino – mixing, percussion
- Csaba Petocz – engineer
- Kathleen Philpott – design
- Demonté Posey – audio production, keyboards, organ, producer
- Drew Ramsey – audio production
- Alejandro Rodriguez – engineer
- Alex Rodriguez – assistant engineer
- Aldo Ruggiero – assistant
- Jochem van der Saag – programming
- Shannon Sanders – audio production, organ, piano, producer, programming, synthesizer
- F. Reid Shippen – mixing
- John Sneltz – engineer
- Jorge Vivo – engineer
- Stephen Walker – art direction, design
- Shelley Wiseman – production coordination
- Joe Wohlmuth – engineer
- Patrick Woodward – engineer, mixing
- Andrew Wyatt – engineer

== Charts ==
Chart (2005)	Peak position
US Billboard 200	133
US Top R&B/Hip-Hop Albums (Billboard)	27

== Release history ==
Hurricane release history
Region	Date	Format	Label	Ref(s)
United States	June 21, 2005	CD; digital download	Friday	
