= Love & Life (Eric Benét album) =

Studio album by Eric Benét
- Released: September 9, 2008
- Studios: Capitol (Hollywood); The Laboratory (Madison, Wisconsin); SRM (Sherman Oaks, California); Numina (Andy Duncan's Studio)
- Length: 55:31
- Labels: Friday; Reprise
- Producers: Eric Benét; Keith Crouch; George Nash, Jr.; Demonte Posey

Eric Benét chronology
| Hurricane (2005) | Love & Life (2008) | Lost in Time (2010) |

Singles from Love & Life
- 1. "You're the Only One" Released: May 13, 2008; 2. "The Hunger" Released: October 14, 2008; 3. "Chocolate Legs" Released: January 6, 2009

Love & Life is the fourth studio album by American R&B singer Eric Benét. It was released on September 9, 2008, on Friday and Reprise Records. The album debuted at number 11 on the US Billboard 200 and number two on Top R&B/Hip-Hop Albums chart with first-week sales of 40,000 copies, making it his highest-charting album since A Day in the Life in 1999. Love & Life also received two 2009 Grammy Award nominations, for Best R&B Album and for Best Male R&B Vocal Performance for "You're the Only One".

== Critical reception ==
Professional ratings
Review scores
| Source | Rating |
|---|---|
| About.com | 3.5/5 stars |
| AllMusic | 3.5/5 stars |
| Artistdirect | 3/5 stars |
| Okayplayer | 89/100 |

AllMusic editor Stephen Thomas Erlewine wrote: "Benét returns to what he does best on Love & Life: making music for love-making. Slow and sultry and steeped in Stevie, Marvin, Luther, and especially Quincy Jones-produced Michael Jackson and Prince's forays into quiet storm, Love & Life is a consolidation of Benét's strengths as a seduction artist. Arriving after the turgid turmoil of Hurricane, this is frankly a relief, as Benét demonstrates a lighter touch throughout Love & Life, shedding any suggestion of personal revelation in favor of courting clichés without blushing." Amy Sciarretto of Artistdirect described Love & Life as "a romantic, adult contemporary R&B record" that "isn't shy about using sex as its predominant subject matter," praising Benét's "dreamy voice" and "sultry music." She concluded that the album is "strong enough to have the gossip mongers asking, 'Halle who?'" and called it Benét's "musical second chance. Okayplayer praised the album as "a pleasant reminder of R&B that doesn't try too hard to convince you of its sincerity or importance," highlighting Benét's "lucid songwriting and vibrant pictures." She concluded that the album is "some great songs and a welcome comeback for classic R&B from one of its few remaining torchbearers."

== Track listing ==
| No. | Title | Writer(s) | Producer(s) | Length |
|---|---|---|---|---|
| 1. | "Love, Patience & Time" | Eric Benét; Demonté Possey | Benét; Possey | 5:27 |
| 2. | "The Hunger" | Benét; Possey | Benét; Possey | 4:04 |
| 3. | "You're the Only One" | Benét; Possey; Greg Gerard; George Nash, Jr. | Benét; Possey; Nash | 4:13 |
| 4. | "Don't Let Go" | Benét; Possey | Benét; Possey | 4:27 |
| 5. | "Everlove" (duet with Terry Dexter) | Benét; Possey | Benét; Possey | 5:10 |
| 6. | "Chocolate Legs" | Benét; Keith Crouch; John "Jubu" Smith | Crouch; Smith | 4:29 |
| 7. | "Weekend Girl" | Benét; Possey | Benét; Possey | 4:51 |
| 8. | "Iminluvwichoo" (duet with Linda Király) | Benét; Possey | Benét; Possey | 4:39 |
| 9. | "Spanish Fly" | Benét; Vikter Duplaix; Pino Paladino; Fred Chalmers | Benét; Possey | 4:30 |
| 10. | "Still I Believe" | Benét; Possey | Benét; Possey | 4:10 |
| 11. | "Sing to Me" | Benét; Possey; Nash | Benét; Possey; Nash | 4:44 |
| 12. | "One More Tomorrow" | Benét; Nash | Benét; Possey | 5:17 |
| Total length: | | | | 55:31 |

ITunes only bonus track
| No. | Title | Length |
|---|---|---|
| 13. | "I Can't Stop" | 5:21 |

== Cover versions ==
English band Blue released a cover version of "You're the Only One" on their album Colours in 2015.

== Charts ==
=== Weekly charts ===
| Chart (2008) | Peak position |
|---|---|
| US Billboard 200 | 11 |
| US Top R&B/Hip-Hop Albums (Billboard) | 2 |

=== Year-end charts ===
| Chart (2008) | Position |
|---|---|
| US Top R&B/Hip-Hop Albums (Billboard) | 58 |
| Chart (2009) | Position |
| US Top R&B/Hip-Hop Albums (Billboard) | 70 |
