= Inside (David Sanborn album) =

Studio album by David Sanborn
- Released: March 23, 1999
- Studio: Camel Island Studio (Los Angeles, California); Avatar Studios, Hiatus Studios, Sound On Sound and Electric Lady Studios (New York City, New York)
- Genre: Jazz, funk, soul
- Length: 47:23
- Label: Elektra
- Producer: Marcus Miller; David Isaac

Professional ratings
Review scores
| Source | Rating |
|---|---|
| AllMusic | 3/5 stars |
| The Penguin Guide to Jazz Recordings | 3.5/4 stars |

Inside is a studio album by David Sanborn, released through Elektra Records in 1999. In 2000, the album won Sanborn the Grammy Award for Best Contemporary Jazz Performance.

== Track listing ==
1. "Corners (For Herbie)" (Marcus Miller) - 4:50
2. "Day Dreaming" (Aretha Franklin) - 5:36; featuring Cassandra Wilson
3. "Trance" (Miller) - 5:02
4. "Brother Ray" (Miller) - 5:57
5. "Lisa" (David Sanborn) - 4:33
6. "When I'm With You" (Miller) - 4:58; featuring Eric Benét and Lalah Hathaway
7. "Naked Moon" (Miller) - 5:41
8. "Cane" (Meshell Ndegeocello) - 0:46
9. "Ain't No Sunshine" (Bill Withers) - 4:12; featuring Sting
10. "Miss You" (Sanborn) - 5:56

== Personnel ==
- David Sanborn – alto saxophone (1–8, 10), sopranino saxophone (9)
- Marcus Miller – Fender Rhodes (1, 6), bass (1–3, 6–9), drums (1), electric piano (2), sitar (2), drum programming (2, 3, 5, 10), arrangements (2), keyboards (3–5, 7, 8, 10), percussion programming (3), vocals (3, 6), guitar solo (4), synth bass (4, 5), electric guitar (5), synthesizers (6), guitars (6, 9), clarinet (7), fretless bass (10), bass clarinet (10)
- Ricky Peterson – Hammond B3 organ (4)
- Gil Goldstein – electric piano (10), arrangements (10)
- Marvin Sewell – National resaphonic guitar (2, 7)
- Dean Brown – acoustic guitar (5), electric guitar (5)
- Bill Frisell – guitars (9)
- Fareed Haque – acoustic guitar (9)
- David Isaac – additional drum and percussion programming (3), drum and percussion programming (5), keyboard effects (10)
- Gene Lake – drums (4, 6, 10)
- Don Alias – percussion (1–7, 9)
- Michael Brecker – tenor saxophone (1, 4)
- Ronnie Cuber – baritone saxophone (4)
- Lenny Pickett – tenor saxophone (4)
- Wallace Roney – trumpet (4)
- Hank Roberts – cello (9)
- Cassandra Wilson – vocals (2)
- Eric Benét – backing vocals (2), vocals (6)
- Dr. John – vocal samples (3)
- Lalah Hathaway – vocals (6)
- Sting – vocals (9)

Production

- Marcus Miller – producer, recording
- Davis Isaac – co-producer, recording
- Goh Hotada – recording, mixing
- Paul Mitchell – recording
- Malcolm Pollack – recording
- Dean Sharenow – recording
- Takamasa Hondu – assistant engineer
- John R. Reigert III – assistant engineer
- Rory Romano – assistant engineer
- Mike Tocci – assistant engineer
- Zach Wind – assistant engineer
- Greg Calbi – mastering at Sterling Sound (New York City, New York)
- Bibi Green – production coordinator
- Linner Vasoll – personal assistant
- Jennifer Roddie – art direction, design
- Michael Wilson – cover photography
- Eric Johnson – photography
