= Sometimes I Cry =

Single by Eric Benét

from the album Lost in Time
- Released: August 2, 2010
- Recorded: 2010
- Studio: The Laboratory Recording Studio
- Genre: R&B
- Length: 4:17 (single); 5:07 (album version)
- Label: Reprise
- Songwriter(s): Eric Benét, George Nash, Jr.

Eric Benét singles chronology
"Chocolate Legs" (2009)	"Sometimes I Cry" (2010)	"Never Want to Live Without You" (2010)

"Sometimes I Cry" is a song by American singer Eric Benét, released as the lead single from his fifth album Lost in Time. The song peaked at number 16 on the Billboard Hot R&B/Hip-Hop Songs chart. Benét earned a 2012 Grammy nomination for Best Traditional R&B Performance for this song.

== Charts ==
=== Weekly charts ===
Chart (2010)	Peak position
South Korea International (Circle)	6
US Adult R&B Songs (Billboard)	1
US Hot R&B/Hip-Hop Songs (Billboard)	16

=== Year-end charts ===
Chart (2010)	Position
US Adult R&B Songs (Billboard)	21
US Hot R&B/Hip-Hop Songs (Billboard)	77

Chart (2011)	Position
US Hot R&B/Hip-Hop Songs (Billboard)	89
