= From E to U: Volume 1 =

From Me to U: Volume 1

Studio album by Eric Benét
- Released: May 28, 2014
- Length: 49:17
- Label: Jordan House; Primary Wave
- Producer: Eric Benét; Demonte Posey

Eric Benét chronology
The One (2014)	From Me to U: Volume 1 (2014)	Eric Benét (2016)

From E to U: Volume 1 is the seventh studio album by American R&B singer Eric Benét. Recorded exclusively for the Asian music market, it was released by Benét's own label Jordan House and Primary Wave on May 28, 2014, with distribution handled by Warner Music Japan. A cover album, it includes the duet "Almost Paradise" with Korean pop singer Ailee. It was later made available worldwide on streaming services such as Spotify.

== Critical reception ==
SoulTracks editor Chris Rizik called the album "a hot mess." He wrote that "fans understand that music is not only art, it is commerce. But From E to U: Volume 1 doubles down on the commerce and saves the art for another day, making it disappointing even by the lower standard of covers albums. It is a cynical snoozer of a project that appears designed only for a quick buck in a land far to the East of us."

== Track listing ==
All tracks produced by Eric Benét and Demonte Posey.

No.	Title	Writer(s)	Length
1.	"Africa"	David Paich; Jeff Porcaro	5:03
2.	"Ride Like the Wind"	Christopher Cross	4:33
3.	"Almost Paradise" (featuring Ailee)	Dean Pitchford; Eric Carmen	3:43
4.	"After the Love Has Gone"	David Foster; Jay Graydon; Bill Champlin	5:10
5.	"What a Fool Believes"	Michael McDonald; Kenny Loggins	4:07
6.	"More Than Words"	Gary Cherone; Nuno Bettencourt	4:50
7.	"Do You Really Want to Hurt Me"	Boy George; Jon Moss	4:52
8.	"Everytime You Go Away"	Daryl Hall	5:11
9.	"Open Arms"	Steve Perry; Jonathan Cain	3:15
10.	"Sara Smile"	Hall; John Oates	4:02

Bonus track
No.	Title	Writer(s)	Length
11.	"Through the Fire"	Foster; Tom Keane; Cynthia Weil	4:33
Total length:			49:17

== Personnel ==
Credits adapted from the liner notes of From E to U: Volume 1.

- Eric Benét – producer
- Andy Duncan – guitar
- Donald Hayes – arranger, horns
- Demonte Posey – drum programming, keyboards, producer

== Charts ==
Chart (2014)	Peak position
Japanese Albums (Oricon)	119
South Korean International Albums (Gaon)	34

== Release history ==
From E to U: Volume 1 release history
Region	Date	Format	Label	Ref(s)
Japan	May 28, 2014	CD; digital download	Jordan House; Primary Wave	
