= Eric Benét (album) =

Studio album by Eric Benét
- Released: October 7, 2016
- Length: 58:58
- Label: Jordan House; BMG
- Producer: Eric Benét; Davy Nathan; Demonté Posey; Jonathan "Jon Rych" Richmond

Eric Benét chronology
From E to U: Volume 1 (2014)	Eric Benét (2016)	The Co-Star (2025)

Singles from Eric Benét
- 1. "Sunshine" Released: July 12, 2016; 2. "Insane" Released: October 21, 2016

Eric Benét is the eighth studio album by American R&B recording artist Eric Benét. It was first released by Jordan House and BMG Rights Management on October 7, 2016. Benét's first major album release in four years following the release of the reissue The Other One and the Japan-exclusive album From E to U: Volume 1, the project features guest appearances from Tamia, Arturo Sandoval and MC Lyte. Supported by the single "Sunshine" and the remix of the track featuring Tamia, Eric Benét debuted at number 12 on the US Top R&B/Hip-Hop Albums chart.

== Critical reception ==
Professional ratings
Review scores
Source	Rating
AllMusic	4/5 stars
Soul in Stereo	4/5 stars

AllMusic editor Andy Kellman rated the album four stars out of five and wrote: "No derailment, this picks up where The One left off, with a mature and modern sound deeply rooted in traditional R&B. Thanks in part to long-term associate Demonté Posey, who produced and wrote almost everything, it is a little friskier and funkier [...] This material never resembles an act of nostalgia, despite its intentional or unintentional references. It all stands on its own, casting the singer in a bright light, whether he's dealing out slow jams, sophisticated funk, or adult contemporary numbers." Edward T. Bowser Soul in Stereo found that the blending of "musical genres on Eric Benét prove to be as timeless as its namesake – it's the type of album on a music veteran can successfully pull off. If his albums are this good in 2016, I can't wait to hear what he cooks up in 2026."

SoulTracks critic Melody Charles called the album "one of his most excellent and enjoyable CDs yet." She noted that "Benét and his longtime collaborator, Demonte Posey, stay true to his proven template of classically-rendered instrumentation anchoring modern twists on love and relationships. Eric is traditionally soulful throughout, yet incorporates elements of other genres that invigorate and expand his style." Erik Ernst from The Milwaukee Journal Sentinel' described the album as a "disc that explores the wide aspects of modern R&B [...] Benét has long been an emotive singer, and that emotion here is rife with love, affection and a devotion to a muse that grooves on rhythm and soul."

== Commercial performance ==
Eric Benét failed to chart on the US Billboard 200 but opened and peaked at number 12 on the Top R&B/Hip-Hop Albums chart. It was the singers first album to miss the chart's top ten. It also reached number 30 on the Independent Albums chart.

== Track listing ==
Eric Benét track listing
No.	Title	Writer(s)	Producer(s)	Length
1.	"Can't Tell U Enough"	Eric Benét; Demonté Posey	Benét; Posey	4:37
2.	"Sunshine"	Benét; Posey; Dammo Farmer; Jairus Mozee; Nick Smith	Benét; Posey	5:13
3.	"Insane"	Benét; Posey	Benét; Posey	4:50
4.	"Cold Trigger"	Benét; Posey; Christian Davis Stalneker; Mozee; Smith	Benét; Posey	4:59
5.	"Home"	Benét; Posey; Farmer; Mozee; Smith	Benét; Posey	4:54
6.	"Holdin' On" (featuring MC Lyte)	Benét; Posey; Stalnecker	Benét; Posey	4:08
7.	"Fun & Games"	Benét; Posey	Benét; Posey	6:16
8.	"Run to Me" (featuring Arturo Sandoval)	Benét; Posey	Benét; Posey	5:10
9.	"Floating Thru Time"	Benét; Posey	Benét; Posey	4:40
10.	"Broke, Beat & Busted"	Benét; Possey; Afton Johnson; Jonathan "Jon Rych" Richmond	Richmond	5:08
11.	"That Day"	Benét	Davy Nathan; Posey^{[a]}	4:25
12.	"Never Be the Same (Luna's Lullaby)"	Benét; Posey	Benét; Posey	4:43
Total length:				58:58

iTunes edition bonus tracks
No.	Title	Writer(s)	Producer(s)	Length
13.	"Sunshine (Remix)" (featuring Tamia)	Benét; Posey; Farmer; Mozee; Smith	Benét; Posey	4:56
Total length:				64:54

UK edition bonus tracks
No.	Title	Writer(s)	Producer(s)	Length
13.	"Sunshine (Remix)" (featuring Tamia)	Benét; Posey; Farmer; Mozee; Smith	Benét; Posey	4:56
14.	"Sunshine (Factor 50 Remix)" (featuring Tamia)	Benét; Posey; Farmer; Mozee; Smith	Benét; Posey; Factor 50^{[a]}	5:09
15.	"Floating Thru Time (Levitation Remix)"	Benét; Posey	Benét; Posey	5:08

Notes

- ^{^[a]} denotes additional producer

== Charts ==
Chart performance for Eric Benét
Chart (2016)	Peak position
US Independent Albums (Billboard)	30
US Top R&B/Hip-Hop Albums (Billboard)	12

== Release history ==
Eric Benét release history
Region	Date	Format	Label	Ref(s)
Various	October 7, 2016	CD; digital download	Jordan House; BMG	
