= So Distracted =

"Bitter"
- Live version single cover

Single by Eric Benét and Chanté Moore

from the album Duets and The Co-Star
- Released: August 22, 2024
- Length: 4:10
- Label: JBR
- Songwriters: Randy Emata; Nina Nelson
- Producers: Eric Benét; Randy Emata

Eric Benét singles chronology
"Something We Can Make Love To" (2004)	"Bitter" (2024)	"Can't Wait" (2005)

"So Distracted" is a duet by American singers Eric Benét and Chanté Moore. It was written by Nina Nelson and Randy Emata and produced by the latter along with Benét for his 2024 extended play Duets. Released as the EP's second single, the song earned largely positive reviews from music critics and peaked at number one on the Adult R&B Songs chart. "So Distracted" was later included on Benét's ninth studio album, The Co-Star (2025).

== Background ==
"So Distracted" was written by Nina Nelson and Randy Emata and recorded by Benét along with fellow R&B singer Chanté Moore for his 2024 extended play Duets. Production on the track was overseen by Benét and Emata. Moore commented on her first collaboration with the singer: "Eric and I have been promising each other that we'd find the right song to do for the longest time. When he played me the track for "So Distracted," I jumped up and said, 'This is it!' I love this song, I love singing with Eric, and I love that we have this special release on Valentine's Day."

== Commercial performance ==
"So Distracted" debuted on the US Adult R&B Songs chart in the week ending January 4, 2025. A sleeper hit, it reached the top of the chart in the week of June 28, 2025. The song marked Benét's fifth number-one hit on the chart as well as his second consecutive chart topper after previous single "Something We Can Make Love To" (2004), a duet with Tamar Braxton, also taken from his Duets EP (2024). "So Distracted" also became Moore's first number-one hit on the Adult R&B Songs chart after having previously reached number two with "Chanté's Got a Man" in 1998.

== Music video ==
A music video for "So Distracted" was directed by Michael Rainin and produced by Rainpix. Shot at the EastWest Studios in Los Angeles, California, the visuals were released on February 14, 2025.

== Credits and personnel ==
Credits lifted from the liner notes of "So Distracted."

- Alison Ball – executive producer
- Eric Benét – producer, vocalist
- Kevin "KD" Davis – mixing and mastering engineer
- Quentin Gulledge – drums
- Chanté Moore – vocalist,
- Randy Emata – drum programming, keyboards, producer, writer
- Nina Nelson – backing vocalist, writer
- Chris Payton — guitar
- Stanley Randolph – percussion
- Manuel Rangel – recording engineer
- Amber Sauer – backing vocalist
- Matty Taylor – bass
- Phillip Whack – flute

== Charts ==
Weekly chart performance for "So Distracted"
Chart (2025)	Peak position
US Adult R&B Songs (Billboard)	1
US R&B/Hip-Hop Airplay (Billboard)	17
