= The One (Eric Benét album) =

Studio album by Eric Benét
- Released: June 5, 2012
- Studio: Third Ward Records
- Length: 57:34
- Label: Jordan House; Primary Wave
- Producer: Eric Benét; Andy Duncan; George Nash, Jr.; Demonté Posey; Ruslan Sirota

Eric Benét chronology
Lost in Time (2010)	The One (2012)	From E to U: Volume 1 (2014)

Singles from The One
- 1. "Real Love" Released: October 24, 2011; 2. "Harriett Jones" Released: May 8, 2012; 3. "News for You" Released: November 13, 2012

The One is the sixth studio album by American R&B recording artist Eric Benét. It was released on June 5, 2012 and marked Benét's debut release with his own label Jordan House Records and Primary Wave, following his departure from Reprise Records after the release of his previous album Lost in Time (2010). The singer worked with longtime collaborators George Nash, Jr. and Demonté Posey on the majority of the album. The One earned generally positive reviews from music critics and debuted and peaked at number 32 on the US Billboard 200. In 2014, Benét released a remix edition of the album, called The Other One, produced by German-Turkish DJ Afropeans.

== Background ==
The album is the follow-up to Benét's fifth studio album, Lost in Time (2010). The One marks a moment of positive transition in his life and lyrically speaks to the many new beginnings developing in his career and family. His first album released on Benét’s newly formed record label Jordan House Records, which he created in partnership with EMI, The One features his signature mid-70s soul groove, a variety of instruments from strings to horns to featured artists and even a duet with his first daughter India. “Real Love” was the first single off The One and was the #1 added song to Urban AC when shipped to radio in October 2011. This new single is a taste of what to expect on Benét’s new album, which he describes as a “very contemporary approach to old-school songwriting integrity”. His second single "Harriett Jones" released as a single on May 8, 2012, followed by a third "News For You" in November of that year. A remixed album The Other One later followed in 2014.

== Critical reception ==
Professional ratings
Review scores
Source	Rating
Allmusic	3/5 stars

AllMusic's Andy Kellman rated the album three stars out of five and wrote: "While ballads like "Gonna Be My Girl" and "Lay It Down" sound closer to 2012 than 1972, and "Hope That It's You" sounds more like a guest appearance on a Shaggy album (rather than a Benét song featuring Shaggy), The One is another decent, retro-minded set from the veteran singer." SoulTracks editor Chris Rizik found that "this may be the best album Eric Benét has crafted since his benchmark introduction some 16 years ago as that young matinee idol tenor with the permanent five o’clock shadow [...] The One is the perfect portrait of Benet’s artistry. Its inviting lyrics of triumph, relationships, and love are also reflective of an artist, new husband and father who has learned some hard lessons about life and this business of music, only to finally find both his personal and creative lives right at home."

== The Other One reissue ==
In 2014, Benet teamed up with German-Turkish DJ and record producer Mousse T. to revisit and rework his 2012 release, adding new instrumentation and changing song structures into a more electronica feel. It received a Europe/Japan only release on May 16, 2014, with Mousse T. credited under his pseudonyme The Afropeans. Benét wanted to show his versatility and do something special for his international fans. It was led by the singles "Runnin'" and "Lay It Down."

== Track listing ==
Standard edition
No.	Title	Writer(s)	Producer(s)	Length
1.	"Harriett Jones"	Eric Benét; George Nash, Jr.	E. Benét; Nash	4:39
2.	"News for You"	E. Benét; Afton Johnson; Nash; John McVicker; Jonathan Richmond; Erick Walls	E. Benét; Nash	5:21
3.	"Real Love"	E. Benét; Nash	E. Benét; Nash	4:17
4.	"Runnin'"	E. Benét; Johnson; McVicker; Richmond; Walls	E. Benét; Nash	4:48
5.	"Redbone Girl" (featuring Lil Wayne)	E. Benét; Dwayne Carter; Johnson; Nash; McVicker; Richmond; Ridge; Walls	E. Benét; Nash	4:49
6.	"Waitin'"	E. Benét; Johnson; McVicker; Richmond; Walls	E. Benét; Nash	5:30
7.	"Hope That It's You" (featuring Shaggy)	E. Benét; Johnson; Nash; McVicker; Richmond; Walls	E. Benét; Nash	4:13
8.	"Gonna Be My Girl"	E. Benét; Demonté Posey	E. Benét; Posey	4:31
9.	"Come Together"	E. Benét; Christian "Osunlade" Warren	E. Benét; Posey	4:49
10.	"Muzik" (featuring India Benét)	E. Benét; I. Benét; Nash	E. Benét; Nash	4:33
11.	"Lay It Down"	E. Benét; Nash	E. Benét; Andy Duncan; Posey	4:30
12.	"Here In My Arms (Lucia's Lullaby)"	E. Benét; Manuela Testolini	E. Benét; Nash; Ruslan Sirota	3:14

iTunes bonus track
No.	Title	Writer(s)	Producer(s)	Length
13.	"Come Home to Me" (featuring Jewel Anguay)	E. Benét; Blake Carter; Johnson; Walls; Nash; McVicker; Richmond	E. Benét; Nash	4:31

iTunes deluxe edition
No.	Title	Writer(s)	Producer(s)	Length
14.	"Touching Again"	E. Benét; Posey; Nash	E. Benét; Posey; Nash	3:53
15.	"That's My Lady"	E. Benét; Posey; Nash	E. Benét; Posey; Nash	4:59

The Other One (Revisited By the Afropeans)
No.	Title	Writer(s)	Producer(s)	Length
1.	"Runnin'" (The Afropeans Revisit)	E. Benét; Johnson; McVicker; Richmond; Walls	E. Benét; Nash; The Afropeans^{[a]}	4:48
2.	"News for You" (The Afropeans Revisit)	E. Benét; Johnson; Nash; McVicker; Richmond; Walls	E. Benét; Nash; The Afropeans^{[a]}	5:21
3.	"Interlude A"		The Afropeans	4:17
4.	"Come Together" (The Afropeans Revisit)	E. Benét; Warren	E. Benét; Posey; The Afropeans^{[a]}	4:49
5.	"Interlude B"		The Afropeans	4:17
6.	"Harriett Jones" (The Afropeans Revisit)	Eric Benét; Nash	E. Benét; Nash; The Afropeans^{[a]}	4:39
7.	"Interlude B"		The Afropeans	4:17
8.	"Gonna Be My Girl" (The Afropeans Revisit)	E. Benét; Posey	E. Benét; Posey; The Afropeans^{[a]}	4:31
9.	"Touching Again" (The Afropeans Revisit)	E. Benét; Posey; Nash	E. Benét; Posey; Nash^{[a]}	4:49
10.	"Interlude B"		The Afropeans	4:17
11.	"Gonna Be My Girl" (The Afropeans Revisit)	E. Benét; Demonté Posey	E. Benét; Posey; The Afropeans^{[a]}	4:31
12.	"Muzik" (The Afropeans Revisit)	E. Benét; I. Benét; Nash	E. Benét; Nash; The Afropeans^{[a]}	4:33
13.	"Here In My Arms (Lucia's Lullaby)" (The Afropeans Revisit)	E. Benét; Testolini	E. Benét; Nash; Sirota; The Afropeans^{[a]}	3:14

Notes

- ^{^[a]} denotes additional producer

== Personnel ==
Credits for The One adapted from Allmusic.

- Jewel A – backing vocalist
- Kevin Arndt – assistant engineer
- Eric Benét – arranger
- Mike Bliesner – assistant engineer
- Phil Chen – guitar, strings
- Kevin "KD Davis – mixing
- Sean Erick – horns
- Denise Janae – backing vocalist
- Afton Johnson – backing vocalist, bass, keyboards
- Sean Jurewicz – assistant engineer
- Ken Krei – assistant engineer
- John Krovoza – strings
- Jeanie Lim – strings
- John Wesley "Stixx" McVicker, Jr. – drums
- Larry Mestel – management
- George Nash, Jr. – arranger, guitar, keyboards*
- Randee St. Nicholas – percussion
- Rafael Padilla – percussion
- Demonte Posey – arranger
- Herb Powers, Jr. – management
- The Regiment Horns – arranger
- Jonathan Richmond – keyboards
- Jay Roach – pedal steel guitar
- Dorrel Salmon – keyboards
- Ruzanna Sargsyan – strings
- Leon Silva – horns
- Ruslan Sirota – arranger, keyboards
- Kevin Sucher – keyboards, management
- Nella Tahriri – backing vocalist
- Denise Trotman – art direction
- Erick Walls – guitar
- Michael "Blue" Williams – management
- Kevin Williams – horns
- Curtis "Sauce" Wilson – drum programming
- Biju Zimmermann – assistant engineer

== Charts ==
=== Weekly charts ===
Chart (2012)	Peak position
Japanese Albums (Oricon)	119
South Korean International Albums (Gaon)	34
US Billboard 200	32
US Top R&B/Hip-Hop Albums (Billboard)	5

=== Year-end charts ===
Chart (2012)	Position
US Top R&B/Hip-Hop Albums (Billboard)	92

== Release history ==
The One release history
Region	Date	Edition(s)	Format	Label	Ref(s)
Various	June 5, 2012	Standard; deluxe	CD; digital download	Jordan House; Primary Wave	
Various	June 3, 2014	The Other One reissue	Digital download	Jordan House; Primary Wave	
