= True to Myself =

Studio album by Eric Benét
- Released: September 24, 1996
- Recorded: The Crib (Milwaukee, Wisconsin); The Chapel (St. Louis, Missouri); The Enterprise (Burbank, California); Roger's Personal Palace (Dayton, Ohio)
- Length: 61:17
- Label: Warner Bros.
- Producer: Eric Benét; Demonte Posey; George Nash, Jr.; Roger Troutman; Christian Warren

Eric Benét chronology
True to Myself (1996)	A Day in the Life (1999)

Singles from True to Myself
- 1. "Let's Stay Together" Released: January 30, 1996; 2. "Spiritual Thang" Released: November 19, 1996; 3. "Femininity" Released: April 29, 1997; 4. "True to Myself" Released: June 20, 1997

True to Myself is the debut album by the American R&B musician Eric Benét. It was released by Warner Bros. Records on September 24, 1996, in the United States. It was his first outing as a solo artist after the dissolution of his former group Benét, which he formed with his sister Lisa Jordan and cousin George Nash, Jr. Benét received his deal with Warner Bros. Records from former EMI Records executive Alison Ball-Gabriel after corporate shakeups caused his former group to be dropped by the record label.

== Background ==
Benet produced most of his debut with Demonté Posey and Nash, both of whom would work with him on his later recordings. In 1995, he released the song "Let's Stay Together", which originally appeared on the soundtrack of the 1996 Martin Lawrence film A Thin Line Between Love and Hate. The music video to the song was directed by Charles Stone III. The second single released from True to Myself was the McG directed "Spiritual Thang". The album's biggest hit was the third single "Femininity", which was directed by a then-unknown Francis Lawrence. "Femininity" also featured an appearance from then-unknown rapper Tiye Phoenix, who played a pregnant woman in the music video. The title track was the fourth and final single released from the album with a video directed by Joseph Kahn.

== Critical reception ==
Professional ratings
Review scores
Source	Rating
AllMusic	4/5 stars
Muzik	7/10

AllMusic editor Leo Stanley called found that "the album suffers from inconsistent material which prevents it from being a thoroughly impressive debut. As it stands, True to Myself is merely an appealing, promising collection of soul that usually straddles the line between classic and urban soul quite skillfully." Billboard editor Paul Verna wrote: "Benét delivers sincere lyrics with an often viscous R&B flow. [He] demonstrates versatility with his voice — from the raw and gritty delivery of the previously mentioned track to the warm clarity used on the ballad "While You Were Here." Musically, the artist also shows chameleon-like diversity."

== Commercial performance ==
By December 1998, the album had sold 213,000 units domestically. By August 2008, True to Myself had moved 295,000 units, according to Nielsen Soundscan.

== Track listing ==
True to Myself track listing
No.	Title	Writer(s)	Producer	Length
1.	"True to Myself"	Eric Benét; George Nash Jr.	Benét; Nash Jr.; Demonté Posey	4:41
2.	"I'll Be There"	Benét; Nash Jr.	Benét; Posey; Nash Jr.	5:19
3.	"If You Want Me to Stay"	Sylvester Stewart	Roger Troutman	3:52
4.	"Let's Stay Together" (Midnight Mix)	Benét; Nash Jr.; Posey	Benét; Nash Jr.; Posey	4:47
5.	"Just Friends"	Benét; Posey; Nash Jr.	Christian Warren	4:36
6.	"Femininity"	Benét; Christian Warren	Warren	4:49
7.	"While You Were Here"	Benét; Posey; Nash Jr.	Benét; Posey	5:46
8.	"Spiritual Thang"	Benét; Nash Jr.; Posey	Benét; Nash Jr.; Posey	4:00
9.	"Chains"	Benét; Nash Jr.; Posey	Benét; Nash Jr.; Posey	4:52
10.	"All in the Game"	Benét; Nash Jr.; Posey	Benét; Nash Jr.; Posey	4:23
11.	"More Than Just a Girlfriend"	Benét; Nash Jr.	Benét; Nash Jr.	5:01
12.	"What If We Was Cool"	Benét; Nash Jr.; Troutman; Dale DeGroat	Benét; Nash Jr.; Posey	4:12
13.	"Let's Stay Together"	Benét; Nash Jr.; Posey	Benét; Nash Jr.; Posey	5:04
Total length:				1:01:22

== Personnel ==
Credits adapted from liner notes.

Performers and musicians

- George Nash, Jr. – Guitar, Drums, Clavinet
- Demonte Posey – Keyboards, Drums, Melodica
- Mark Lomax – Drums
- Warren Crawford – Bass
- Rio – Bass
- Skeeta – Bass, Guitar
- Gumby – Guitar
- Eric "Kenya" Baker – Guitar
- Christian Warren – Keyboards, Drums, Fender Rhodes, Piano
- Curtis "Sauce" Wilson – Drums
- Roger Troutman – Keyboards, Bass, Guitar, Vocoder
- Tyrone W. Griffin – Trumpet
- Fernando Harkless – Saxophone
- Steve Baxter – Trombone
- Barbara "Bobbi" Schneider – Violin
- Paul Gminder – Cello
- Eric Benét, Lisa Jordan-Weathers – Background vocals
- Alison Ball-Gabriel – Executive Producer
- Recording engineer – Eric Benét, Demonte Posey and George Nash, Jr., Roger Troutman, Hilary Bercovici, Skeeta
- Mixing: Eric Benét, Demonte Posey and George Nash, Jr., Kevin "K.D." Davis, Roger Troutman, Hilary Bercovici, Skeeta
- Mastering: Brian Gardner
- Brad Hitz – Photography
- Terry Robertson, Stephen Walker – Art Direction
- Stephen Walker – Design

== Charts ==
Weekly chart performance for True to Myself
Chart (1996)	Peak position
US Billboard 200	174
US Top R&B/Hip-Hop Albums (Billboard)	38

== Release history ==
True to Myself release history
Region	Date	Format	Label	Ref(s)
United States	September 24, 1996	CD; cassette	Warner Bros.	
