= The Co-Star =

Studio album by Eric Benét
- Released: June 6, 2025
- Length: 52:38
- Label: JBR
- Producers: Eric Benét; Darhyl Camper; Cardiak; Antonio Dixon; Randy Emata; Laney Stewart; Wu10

Eric Benét chronology
Eric Benét (2016)	The Co-Star (2025)	It's Christmas (2025)

Singles from The Co-Star
- 1. "Can't Wait" Released: March 26, 2025; 2. "Must Be Love" Released: June 13, 2025

The Co-Star is the ninth studio album by American singer Eric Benét. His first album in eight years, it was released through his own label, JBR Creative Group on June 6, 2025. A continuation of his five-track EP Duets (2024), it comprises duets with female singers such as Alex Isley, Ari Lennox, Keri Hilson, India.Arie, Goapele, Melanie Fiona, Jordin Sparks, and others. Benét worked the producers Darhyl Camper, Cardiak, Antonio Dixon, Randy Emata, and Laney Stewart on material for the project.

Critics praised The Co-Star, describing it as a diverse, collaborative R&B album that blends genres and emphasizes duet performances. While the album failed to chart, it produced Benét's highest-charting singles in years, with Duets offsprings "Something We Can Make Love to" with Tamar Braxton and "So Distracted" with Chanté Moore both becoming number-one hits on the US Adult R&B Songs chart. "Can't Wait," released in March 2025 and featuring Keri Hilson, served as The Co-Star's lead single.

== Background ==
After a longer break from the music industry, Benét released his self-titled eighth studio album through his own label Jordan House in partnership with BMG Rights Management. The album produced the Adult R&B Songs number-two hit "Sunshine" but failed to chart on the US Billboard 200, though it opened and peaked at number 12 on the Top R&B/Hip-Hop Albums chart. Recognizing he was more of a creative than an executive, Benét asked longtime friend and former Warner Music executive Allison Ball to serve as CEO of JBR Creative Group, his latest label. Ball, in turn, urged him to make a strong debut by recording a duets project. This led Benét and his team to begin developing the Duets EP, exploring the idea of a project featuring only female collaborators, with their eyes set on an album that would extend the idea to even more songs.

With Duets released in 2024, Benét began piecing together the album. Seeking a relevant sound, he consulted a variety of fresh collaborators to work with him on the project, including Darhyl Camper, Cardiak, Antonio Dixon, Randy Emata, and Laney Stewart. When discussing how he chose collaborators for the duets, the singer explained that certain songs demand a specific visceral emotional response — an instinct he discovered early in his career. He further described the selection process as "audio alchemy," acknowledging its complexity while expressing a deep passion for it. Initially stuck on a name, it was duet partner Keri Hilson who suggested the album to be titled The Co-Star. Corinne Bailey Rae served as inspiration for the song "Eres mi vida" with Pia Toscano. Initially offered to be recorded with her, she declined the offer and instead recorded "Fly Away" with Benét.

== Critical reception ==
Professional ratings
Review scores
Source	Rating
Reviews & Dunn	B+
Shatter the Standards	4/5 stars

The Co-Star earned generally favorable reviews. Tabia N. Mullings, writing for Shatter the Standards, found that The Co-Star "doesn't reinvent Benét's sound or break any mold. Instead, it refashions it." She added: "By ceding headline space to peers and protégés, he reinforces an R&B tradition built on communal expression. The album's conversation, begun on Duets and now rendered in full color, shows that artistry can deepen with time away, provided the return is purpose-driven and collaborative at its core." This Is R&B described The Co-Star as a "lush, genre-blending collection" and concluded: "With production ranging from stripped-back soul to sweeping orchestral arrangements, this highly anticipated release celebrates the beauty of collaboration and the enduring power of R&B storytelling. The Co-Star is not just a new album — it’s a statement of musical unity and artistic evolution."

Edward Bowser from Soul in Stereo ranked the album among the best R&B albums of 2025. He noted that the "album's strength is its diversity – of course we get the expected bedroom burners, but there's also hip-hop inspired efforts, reflections on Southern culture, beautiful Latin-infused performances and high-octane empowerment anthems. The Co-Star is an extremely fulfilling experience, and proof that it takes two to make a thing go right." Derrick Dunn from Reviews & Dunn called The Co-Star a "duet-driven masterclass in grown and sexy vibes." He felt that the album "establishes itself as a modern example for duet albums through its smooth and sensual sound while maintaining a foundation of mutual respect in a genre driven by connection and storytelling. Real R&B fans will find this collection ideal for playlist curation." Rolling Stone's Meagan Jordan remarked that the album feels "like a compilation of Benét’s vast musical interests and expertise. Though he’s often dubbed a neo-soul artist [...] the purpose behind The Co-Star seems to be his way of stretching listeners' ears. While there are traditional R&B elements on the album, it often feels like an international experience, with sounds from the UK and Brazil tapping into the musical experiences of his childhood."

== Track listing ==
The Co-Star track listing
No.	Title	Writer(s)	Producer(s)	Length
1.	"Gaslight" (with Ari Lennox)	Eric Benét; Courtney Salter; Darhyl Camper; Daniel Church; Rob Debose	Camper; Debose^{[a]}	3:51
2.	"Remember Love" (with Alex Isley)	Benét; Isley; Antonio Dixon	Dixon	2:55
3.	"Can't Wait" (with Keri Hilson)	Benét; Hilson; Camper; Rafael Dewayne Ishman; Terrell "Tre" Roper	Camper	3:37
4.	"Must Be Love" (with Indie.Arie)	Benét; Arie; Camper; Ishman; Terius Gesteelde-Diamant	Camper; Debose^{[a]}; Green^{[a]}	3:23
5.	"Fly Away" (with Corinne Bailey Rae)	Benét; Bailey Rae; Dixon; Steve Mostyn	Dixon	4:53
6.	"Something We Can Make Love to" (with Tamar Braxton)	Laney Stewart; Ishman; Gesteelde-Diamant	L. Stewart; Tricky Stewart^{[b]}; Kuk Harrell^{[b]}	3:31
7.	"Southern Pride" (with Judith Hill)	Benét; Bailey Rae	Benét; Randy Emata	4:16
8.	"More of the Same" (with Goapele)	Emata; Chelsea Williams	Benét; Emata	6:22
9.	"Me & Mine" (with Melanie Fiona)	Benét; Dixon; Carl McCormick; Kelvin Wooten; William Gittens; Michael Lloyd Hamilton; Brittany B.	Dixon; Cardiak; Wu10	3:16
10.	"Change" (with Jordin Sparks and Autumn Paige)	Dixon; Paige; Brian Sledge; Justin Lay; King Midas Touch; Scott Carter; Vanessa Wood; Hamilton; Sam SZND	Dixon; BJ the Chicago Kid^{[a]}; King Midas Touch^{[a]}; Triangle Park^{[a]}	3:02
11.	"So Distracted" (with Chanté Moore)	Emata; Nina Nelson	Benét; Emata	4:10
12.	"Too Soon" (with SalDoce)	Emata; Chelsea Williams	Benét; Emata	4:17
13.	"Eres mi vida" (with Pia Toscano)	Emata; Williams	Benét; Emata	4:59
Total length:				52:38

Notes

- ^{^[a]} denotes a co-producer
- ^{^[b]} denotes a vocal producer

== Release history ==
The Co-Star release history
Region	Date	Format	Label	Ref(s)
Various	June 6, 2025	CD; download; streaming	JBR Creative Group	
