= A Day in the Life (Eric Benét album) =

Studio album by Eric Benét
- Released: April 27, 1999
- Length: 63:40
- Label: Warner Bros.
- Producer: Eric Benét; Demonte Posey; George Nash, Jr.; James Poyser; Ali Shaheed Muhammad; Somethin' for the People; Wyclef Jean; Brian Alexander Morgan

Eric Benét chronology
True to Myself (1996)	A Day in the Life (1999)	Hurricane (2005)

Singles from A Day in the Life
- 1. "Georgy Porgy" Released: February 8, 1999; 2. "Spend My Life With You" Released: June 15, 1999; 3. "When You Think of Me" Released: February 22, 2000

A Day in the Life is the second studio album by American R&B singer Eric Benét. It was released on April 27, 1999, on Warner Bros. Records. Benet's follow-up to his debut album, True to Myself (1996), it has sold close to 900,000 copies in the United States.

== Critical reception ==
Professional ratings
Review scores
Source	Rating
AllMusic	4/5 stars
Los Angeles Times	3/4 stars
USA Today	3/4 stars

AllMusic editor Michael Gallucci wrote: "Benét scores with a series of mellow grooves and sizzling duets aimed at both the body and brain. A Day in the Life is sharper than contemporary R&B, keeping the arrangements and production simple, all the while nodding toward the genre's golden era of the '70s." Yahoo! Music UK called A Day in the Life "an appropriately polished package with collaborations from Wyclef Jean, DuPlaix and George Nash, Jr. amongst the collaborators. Fans [...] won't be disappointed." USA Today critic Steve Jones praised A Day in the Life for establishing Benét as a "soulful and thoughtful love man," highlighting duets like "Georgy Porgy" with Faith Evans, "Spend My Life With You" with Tamia, and the edgy "Ghetto Girl" with Me’shell NdegeOcello, while noting that although he "occasionally gets too smooth," he compensates with the jazzy "When You Think of Me" and the churchy "Love the Hurt Away."

== Track listing ==
Credits adapted from liner notes and Allmusic.

No.	Title	Writer(s)	Producer	Length
1.	"That's Just My Way"	Eric Benét; Chalmers Alford; Ali Shaheed Muhammad	Muhammad; Benét^{[a]}	5:16
2.	"Georgy Porgy" (featuring Faith Evans)	David Paich	Somethin' for the People	4:40
3.	"Spend My Life with You" (featuring Tamia)	Benét; Demonte Posey; George Nash, Jr.	Benét; Posey; Nash	4:35
4.	"Something Real"	Jeffrey Young; Curtis Wilson; Rochad Holiday; Benét; Leslie Butler; Shari Watson	Kenya B; Somethin' for the People	4:33
5.	"Loving Your Best Friend"	Wyclef Jean; Jerry Duplessis; Benét	Jean; Duplessis	4:20
6.	"When You Think of Me" (featuring Roy Ayers)	Benét; James Poyser; Vikter DuPlaix	Poyser; DuPlaix; Benét^{[a]}	5:43
7.	"Lamentation"	Benét; Alford; Muhammad	Muhammad; Benét^{[a]}	4:07
8.	"Dust in the Wind"	Kerry Livgren	Brian A. Morgan	4:30
9.	"Why You Follow Me"	Benét; Alford; Muhammad	Muhammad; Benét^{[a]}	5:24
10.	"Come as You Are"	Benét; Nash Jr.	Benét; Posey; Nash	5:11
11.	"Love the Hurt Away" (featuring Me'Shell Ndegeocello)	Benét; Posey; Nash Jr.	Benét; Posey; Nash	4:14
12.	"Ghetto Girl" (featuring Me'Shell Ndegeocello)	Benét; Posey; Young	Wilson	4:12
13.	"Love of My Own"	Benét; Poyser; DuPlaix	Poyser; DuPlaix; Benét^{[a]}	5:42

Notes

- ^{^[a]} denotes co-producer

== Personnel ==
Credits adapted from liner notes and Discogs.

- Ali Shaheed Muhammad – drums
- Chalmers "Spanky" Alford – guitar
- Curtis "Sauce" Wilson – drum and keyboard programming
- Eric "Kenya" Baker – drum and keyboard programming
- Demonte Posey – keyboards, B–3 organ, drum programming, synth bass, fender rhodes
- Leslie Butler – keyboards
- Roy Ayers – vibraphone
- James Poyser – keyboards, fender rhodes
- Isaac Phillips – guitar
- Brian Frazier Moore – drums, drum programming
- Jef Lee Johnson – 12 string guitar
- Jazzy G – guitars
- Eric Benet – background vocals, lead vocals
- Jeff "Fuzzy" Young – background vocals
- Tamia – background vocals
- Shari Watson – background vocals
- Alison Ball–Gabriel – executive producer
- Me'Shell Ndegeocello – background vocals
- Brian Gardner – mastering
- Brad Hitz – photography
- Melanie Nissen – photography
- Stephen Walker – art direction and design

== Charts ==
=== Weekly charts ===
Chart (1999)	Peak position
Dutch Albums (Album Top 100)	81
French Albums (SNEP)	53
UK Albums (OCC)	67
US Billboard 200	25
US Top R&B/Hip-Hop Albums (Billboard)	6

=== Year-end charts ===
Chart (1999)	Position
US Billboard 200	177
US Top R&B/Hip-Hop Albums (Billboard)	49
Chart (2000)	Position
US Top R&B/Hip-Hop Albums (Billboard)	95

== Certifications ==
Region	Certification	Certified units/sales
United States (RIAA)	Gold	897,000

== Release history ==
A Day in the Life release history
Region	Date	Format	Label	Ref(s)
United States	April 27, 1999	CD; cassette	Warner Bros.	
