= Eric Benét =

American musician (born 1966)

- Benét in 2025
- Born: Eric Benét Jordan; October 15, 1966 (age 60); Mobile, Alabama, U.S.
- Occupations: Singer-songwriter; musician
- Years active: 1988–present
- Spouses: Halle Berry (m. 2001; div. 2005) Manuela Testolini (m. 2011)
- Partner: Tami Stauff (1988–1993; her death)
- Children: 3
- Awards: Full list
- Musical career
- Origin: Milwaukee, Wisconsin, U.S.
- Genres: R&B, soul, neo soul
- Instruments: Vocals, piano, guitar, keyboards
- Works: Eric Benét discography
- Labels: Jordan House; Primary Wave Music; EMI; Reprise; Friday; Warner Bros.; Gerard

Eric Benét Jordan (born October 15, 1966) is an American R&B singer-songwriter and musician. He has been nominated for four Grammy Awards.

== Early life and education ==
Benét was born on October 15, 1966, in Mobile, Alabama. He was raised in Milwaukee, Wisconsin, the youngest of five siblings. Benét expressed an interest in music at an early age, but was initially encouraged by his father, a police officer who died of cancer, to attend college and pursue a "stable" career. He graduated from Milwaukee Trade and Technical High School and enrolled in college, but later dropped out.

== Career ==
Benét began his career as a member of a group called Gerard in the late 1980s. Later, Benét, his sister Lisa, and his cousin George Nash Jr. formed a band called Benét and released a self-titled album in 1992 which sold over 100,000 copies. In 1994, he signed with Warner Bros. Records, releasing his solo debut album, True to Myself in 1996. Individual songs from the album were successful, including the top-ten R&B hits "Spiritual Thang", "Femininity" and "Let's Stay Together", which originally appeared on the soundtrack of the film A Thin Line Between Love and Hate. His second album, A Day in the Life, was released in 1999 and included the song "Spend My Life with You", featuring Tamia. The song rose to No. 1 on the US Billboard R&B chart for three weeks, was certified gold, and was nominated for a 2000 Grammy Award for "Best R&B Performance by a Duo or Group". The album also won a Soul Train Music Award for "Best R&B/Soul Album, Male".

Eric and George were actually partners in Gerard Entertainment and it was Gerard Entertainment who developed Lisa and Eric for shopping to EMI. George Nash Jr. and Greg Gerard and Eric produced many of the demos with all being engineered by Bill Gerard. Eric (and eventually Lisa), George and the team racked up 1,600 hours of recording in the studio owned by Gerard Entertainment before their deal was shopped by Roddie H. Beaudoin, with Gerard Ent. attorneys Henry Root (LA) and Fred Davis (NY) for the original EMI album.

Eric and George originally approached Rod Beaudoin at Cinema ala Carte held at Milwaukee County Zoo with a cassette tape of some demos they had done in Waukesha, WI. Beaudoin immediately brought the music to the other partners and both were immediately made a part of Gerard Entertainment.

In between albums, Benét collaborated with his then-labelmates Somethin' for the People on their 1997 album This Time It's Personal singing leads on the single "Act Like You Want It". In 2001, he recorded a song for Earth, Wind, and Fire's 30th anniversary CD, and began work on a new album titled Better and Better, which was set to be a departure from his previous work. Benét's label, however, refused to release this album, forcing him to stay in the R&B genre. Due to disagreements regarding music style and creative freedom, Benét left Warner Bros. and signed to Reprise-distributed label Friday Records and recorded his next album, Hurricane, which became his third studio album following its release on June 21, 2005, in the US. "I Wanna Be Loved" was the song that received the most airplay. The single reached number two on the Urban Adult Contemporary chart.

His fourth album Love & Life was released on September 9, 2008. It debuted at number eleven on the Billboard 200 and number two on the Top R&B/Hip-Hop Albums chart, making this his own highest peak position since A Day in the Life in 1999. The first single "You're the Only One" is also his first top 20 hit on the R&B chart in two years. Lost in Time was Benét's fifth studio album which was released in the US on November 30, 2010. The first single "Sometimes I Cry" reached number one on the Hot Adult R&B Songs Chart. With its musical direction representing Benét's homage to the sweet soul sound of the early to mid-1970s, the album featured duets with Faith Evans; Chrisette Michelle; Ledisi; and Eddie Levert of The O'Jays.

On June 5, 2012, Benét released his album The One. It was the first album released on Benét's newly formed record label Jordan House Records, which he created in partnership with EMI. "Real Love" was the first single off The One and was the No. 1 added song to Urban AC when shipped to radio in October 2011. In 2013, Benét's sixth studio album, The One, won him the SoulTracks Readers' Choice Award for Best Male Vocalist. The One delivered three hit tracks including "Runnin", "Real Love", and "Harriett Jones". In April 2014, Benét signed R&B singer-songwriter Calvin Richardson and Goapele to his imprint along with BMG/Primary Wave Music to release their upcoming albums in the US.

In 2014, Benét also released an international album, The Other One, teaming up with the European production collective, The Afropeans to revisit his 2012 album The One. Later that year, he released an album of classic cover songs, exclusively distributed in Japan, titled, From E to U, Vol. 1. In April 2016, he announced a new single "Sunshine" set to premiere on May 13, ahead of his album that was due in the fall. On October 7, 2016, Benét released his eponymous eighth studio album and first major album release since 2012's "The One", the album featured guest appearances from Tamia, Arturo Sandoval and MC Lyte. In 2020, during the COVID-19 pandemic, Benet started an on-demand series powered by Omnis titled Eric After Dark (stylized as Eric @fter Dark).

On April 25, 2025, "Can't Wait", a song in collaboration with Keri Hilson was released.

=== Acting ===
Benét has also been active as an actor. He had a recurring role on For Your Love (1998–2002). In 2001, he made his big-screen debut—alongside that of singer Mariah Carey—in Glitter; the film (which has elements of romance, drama, and comedy) was loosely based on Carey's own life and early experiences within the music industry. Additionally, in 2005, he appeared on Half & Half, in which he portrayed Reece Wilcox, and had a recurring role on the 2007 MTV show Kaya. On July 9, 2011, Benét's second feature film role, Trinity Goodheart, premiered at the American Black Film Festival. It aired on GMC on August 20. In 2013, Benét appeared on the second season of BET's hit television show, the Real Husbands of Hollywood. He was a guest star, alongside Kevin Hart, Bobby Brown, and Boris Kodjoe. In 2022, he appeared in Greed: A Seven Deadly Sins Story.

== Personal life ==
Benét's eldest daughter India Brianne Jordan was born on December 3, 1991, to his partner Tami Stauff, who died in a car accident on April 24, 1993. He married actress Halle Berry in January 2001, but by early October 2003, they had separated, with the divorce finalized in January 2005.

On July 31, 2011, Benét married Toronto native Manuela Testolini, ex-wife of Prince. Their first child together, a girl named Lucia Bella, was born on December 21, 2011. Their second daughter, Amoura Luna, was born on July 13, 2014.

== Discography ==
Studio albums

- True to Myself (1996)
- A Day in the Life (1999)
- Hurricane (2005)
- Love & Life (2008)
- Lost in Time (2010)
- The One (2012)
- From E to U: Volume 1 (2014)
- Eric Benét (2016)
- The Co-Star (2025)

Collaboration albums

- Benét (with Benét) (1992)

== Filmography ==
=== Film ===
Year	Title	Role	Notes
2001	Glitter	Rafael	
2011	Trinity Goodheart	Jeremy	TV movie
2020	Sanctuary	Pastor Jacob	Short
2022	Greed: A Seven Deadly Sins Story	Godfrey Anderson	TV movie

=== Television ===
Year	Title	Role	Notes
1996-06	Soul Train	Himself	Guest cast: season 26-29 & 35
1999	It's Showtime at the Apollo	Himself	Episode: "Eric Benét and Terry Dexter"
1999-00	For Your Love	Jamel	Recurring cast: season 3
2000	Beverly Hills, 90210	Himself	Episode: "Ode to Joy"
2001	Access Granted	Himself	Episode: "Mary J. Blige : Family Affair"
2002	Mad TV	Himself	Episode: "Episode #8.7"
2005	Half & Half	Reece Wilcox	Episode: "The Big Who's Wooing Who Episode"
2006	The Dome	Himself	Episode: "Episode #1.37"
2006	Top of the Pops	Himself	Episode: "March 26, 2006"
2007	Kaya	T. Davis	Recurring cast
2009	The Apprentice	Himself	Episode: "Cupcake Challenge"
2010	Hot 50 of 2010 Countdown	Himself	Episode: "40 to 30... Eric Benet, Freddie Jackson, SWV"
2011	The Hot 10	Himself / host	Episode: "Episode #1.23"
2012	American Idol	Himself	Episode: "Top 9 Results"
2012	As Written	Himself	Episode: "Angie Stone"
2012	Apollo Live	Himself	Episode: "Episode #5.4"
2013	Real Husbands of Hollywood	Himself	Recurring cast: season 2
2017	Hollywood Today Live	Himself / guest co-host	Recurring guest co-host: season 2
2021	A Closer Look	Himself	Episode: "A Closer Look with Eric Benét"
2022	Bobby Brown: Every Little Step	Himself	Episode: "Bobby Makes His Comeback"
2023	Uncensored	Himself	Episode: "Eric Benét"
2024	Unsung	Himself	Episode: "Bobby Caldwell"

== Awards and nominations ==
- Black Reel Awards

Year	Nominee / work	Award	Result
2002	"Love Don't Love Me" (from The Brothers)	Best Original or Adapted Song	Won
2012	Trinity Goodheart	Best Actor: T.V. Movie/Cable	Nominated

- Grammy Award

Year	Nominee / work	Award	Result
2000	"Spend My Life with You" (with Tamia)	Best R&B Performance by a Duo or Group with Vocals	Nominated
2009	"You're the Only One"	Best Male R&B Vocal Performance	Nominated
2009	Love & Life	Best R&B Album	Nominated
2012	"Sometimes I Cry"	Best Traditional R&B Performance	Nominated

- NAACP Image Award

Year	Nominee / work	Award	Result
1997	Eric Benét	Outstanding New Artist	Nominated
2000	Eric Benét	Outstanding Male Artist	Nominated
2000	"Spend My Life with You" (with Tamia)	Outstanding Song	Won
2000	A Day in the Life	Outstanding Album	Nominated
2001	Eric Benét	Outstanding Male Artist	Nominated
2001	"When You Think of Me" (Directed by Prentice Smith)	Outstanding Music Video	Nominated
