= Lost in Time (Eric Benét album) =

Studio album by Eric Benét
- Released: November 30, 2010
- Recorded: 2009–10; Various recording locations
- Genre: Soul; R&B
- Length: 51:43
- Label: Reprise
- Producer: Eric Benét, George Nash, Jr., Demonté Posey

Eric Benét chronology
Love & Life (2008)	Lost in Time (2010)	The One (2012)

Singles from Lost in Time
- 1. "Sometimes I Cry" Released: August 2, 2010; 2. "Never Want to Live Without You" Released: November 1, 2010

Lost in Time is the fifth studio album by American R&B recording artist Eric Benét, released November 30, 2010 on Reprise Records. It is the follow-up to Love & Life (2008). Production for the album took place during 2010 at various recording studios and was handled by Benét, George Nash, Jr., and Demonté Posey. Lost in Time contains musical elements of 1970s soul music and features guest appearances by Chrisette Michele, Faith Evans, Eddie Levert, Ledisi, and Benét's daughter, India.

The album debuted at number 33 on the US Billboard 200 chart, selling 32,200 copies in its first week. Its first single "Sometimes I Cry" became an Urban AC hit and peaked at number 16 on the US Billboard Hot R&B/Hip-Hop Songs chart. Upon its release, Lost in Time received positive reviews from music critics. Benét promoted the album with a supporting tour that spanned November to December 2010.

== Background and recording ==
The album is the follow-up to Benét's fourth studio album, Love & Life (2008). Recording sessions took place during 2010 at various recording locations, including Big City Recording in Granada Hills, California, La Casa De Benét Studio and Studio City Sound in Studio City, California, Tanner-Monagle and The Laboratory Recording Studio in Milwaukee, Wisconsin, and The Palms Studio in Las Vegas, Nevada. Benét produced the album with songwriter Demonté Posey and longtime creative partner George Nash, Jr., Benét's cousin. He returned to his hometown Milwaukee and recorded with local musicians for the album, including the string section of the Milwaukee Symphony Orchestra. Benét also recorded duets for the album with R&B recording acts Faith Evans, Chrisette Michele, Ledisi, and Eddie Levert. The album was engineered and mixed by Kevin Sucher.

== Composition ==
"Paid"
The socially conscious, Philly soul-inspired song features gritty guest vocals from Eddie Levert of The O'Jays and crooner-smooth vocals by Benét.

Lost in Time incorporates elements of 1970s soul music. For the album, Benét sought to expand on the classicist soul style of his previous album's title track, "Love & Life", and produce an album-length homage to 1970s-era R&B. Benét said of the album's style in a press release, "People just need to have some feel good R&B in their lives. I want people to remember what music can feel like, and that desire took me all the way back to that time. My development as an artist is a direct result of being immersed in that era [...] When it comes to something that resonates in your soul, you have to have something constructed with live musicians". Prior to recording, he researched articles and documentaries about audio recording in that time period. In an interview for Blues & Soul, he discussed recording live in order to authenticate such a sound, stating

[I]n terms of the recording techniques [...] [I] just tried to stick to the blueprint as close as possible. In that, with every track I pretty much assembled my musicians, had the drummer count it off, and then had everyone just playing off each other. You know, rather than doing say the drum track first and then editing that to make it as perfect as we could before laying the bass down, I basically just had everybody mic-ed up and ready to go and then vibing off each other as we actually laid the songs down.

== Release and promotion ==
The album was released by Reprise Records on November 30, 2010. Its first single "Sometimes I Cry" was released on August 2, 2010 and became a number-one hit on the Urban AC chart. It peaked at number 16 in November and ultimately spent five weeks on the US Billboard Hot R&B/Hip-Hop Songs chart. It also charted at number 73 on the Billboard Hot 100 Airplay. Benét has said of the song, "[It] is about how you've completely moved on but still there's still some melancholy about the break-up. Maybe you're even dating somebody, but sometimes, when you're alone, you're sad about what could have been". "Never Want to Live Without You" was released as the album's second single on November 1. It charted at number 75 on the Billboard Hot R&B/Hip-Hop Songs. In promotion of Lost in Time, Benét is performing on a two-month-long, nationwide tour with R&B recording artist Fantasia. The tour spans November and December, concluding with December 31, 2010 and January 1, 2011 concert dates at the Fox Theatre in St. Louis, Missouri.

== Reception ==
Lost in Time debuted at number 33 on the US Billboard 200 chart, with first-week sales of 32,200 copies in the United States. It also entered at number eight on Billboard's Top R&B/Hip-Hop Albums chart.

The album received positive reviews from contemporary music critics. Allmusic editor Stephen Thomas Erlewine gave it three-and-a-half out of five stars and observed a "seductive pastiche" on "the kind of record that might not be deep but shimmers pleasingly on the surface". Billboard's Gail Mitchell called it a "spirited nod to the '70s soul/funk that has influenced [Benét's] career". Jon Caramanica of The New York Times felt that Benét's voice is "more flexible than ever" and called him "an able and sometimes ardent mimic to boot, not just of Maxwell’s tender histrionics but of several other styles". Milwaukee Journal Sentinel writer Jon M. Gilbertson complimented Benét's musical influences and smooth soul style. USA Today's Steve Jones gave the album three out of four stars and praised his "sensual and sophisticated balladry" on the album. Mikael Wood of The Village Voice called it a "crafty album" and wrote that Benét "expertly channels the plush balladry of mid-’80s Luther Vandross ('Never Live Without You'), the propulsive zing of early-’70s Philly soul ('Paid,' featuring Eddie Levert himself), and the frantic cheer of last-days disco ('Good Life')".

== Track listing ==
Standard edition
No.	Title	Writer(s)	Length
1.	"Never Want to Live Without You"	Eric Benét, George Nash, Jr.	4:28
2.	"Feel Good" (feat. Faith Evans)	Benét, Nash	3:45
3.	"Sometimes I Cry"	Benét, Nash	5:07
4.	"Always a Reason"	Benét, Nash	4:11
5.	"Paid" (feat. Eddie Levert)	Benét, Nash	4:46
6.	"Take It" (feat. Chrisette Michele)	Benét, Nash	6:14
7.	"Stir It Up"	Benét, Afton Johnson, John McVicker, Nash, Micah Shaw	4:47
8.	"Summer Love" (feat. India Benét)	Benét, Nash, Demonté Posey	4:50
9.	"Lost in Time"	Benét, Nash	3:45
10.	"Good Life" (feat. Ledisi)	Benét, Nash	4:06
11.	"Something's Wrong"	Benét, Nash, Posey	5:33

Target exclusive edition
No.	Title	Length
1.	"Never Want to Live Without You"
2.	"Feel Good" (feat. Faith Evans)
3.	"Sometimes I Cry"
4.	"Always a Reason"
5.	"Paid" (feat. Eddie Levert)
6.	"Take It" (feat. Chrisette Michele)
7.	"Stir It Up"
8.	"Summer Love" (feat. India Benét)
9.	"Lady"
10.	"Lost in Time"
11.	"Good Life"
12.	"Last Train"
13.	"Something's Wrong"

iTunes deluxe edition
No.	Title	Length
12.	"Trippin'"
13.	"I Might"
14.	"Better And Better"
15.	"Wake Up Everybody"

== Personnel ==
Credits for Lost in Time adapted from Allmusic.

Performers and musicians

- Eric Benét – executive producer, horn arrangements, producer, string arrangements, vocal arrangement, vocals
- India Benét – vocals, background vocals
- Yetunde Bronson – choir, chorus
- Mario Brown – choir, chorus
- Paul Brozowski – trombone
- Chrisette Michele – vocals
- Timothy Cobb – string conductor
- Ericka Collier – choir, chorus
- Greg Collier – choir, chorus, background vocals
- Aaron Cunningham – choir, chorus
- Faith Evans – vocals, background vocals
- Greg Flint – French horn
- Sena Ford-Williams – choir, chorus
- Michael Franceschi – trombone
- Lisa Fuller – violin
- Mike Giacobassi – violin
- Jason Gillette – flute, alto flute, alto saxophone
- Nathan Hackett – viola
- Kathy Harris – choir, chorus
- Denise Janae – vocals, background vocals
- Afton Johnson – bass
- John Johnson – guitar
- Guy Kammerer – flugelhorn, trumpet
- Danis Kelly – harp
- Jeanyu Kim – violin
- Tim Klabunde – violin
- Scott Kreger – bass
- Kathryn Krubsack – French horn
- Ledisi – vocals
- Eddie Levert – vocals, background vocals
- Laura Love – cello
- Sascha Mandl – violin
- John McVicker – choir, chorus, drums, background vocals
- Brett Murphey – flugelhorn, trumpet
- George Nash, Jr. – Fender rhodes, guitar, horn arrangements, instrumentation, keyboards, producer, soloist, string arrangements, synthesizer, vocal arrangement
- Rafael Padilla – percussion
- Michael Pauers – baritone saxophone
- Jeff Pietrangelo – flugelhorn, trumpet
- Erin Pipal – viola
- Andy Raciti – bass
- Brek Renzelman – viola
- Margot Schwartz – violin
- Eric Segnitz – violin
- Ilana Setapin – violin
- Micah Shaw – Fender rhodes, piano, synthesizer
- Ruslan Sirota – piano, synthesizer
- Karen Smith – violin
- Kim Staples – choir, chorus
- Michelle Stokes – choir, chorus
- Peter Szczepanek – cello
- Cornelius – choir, chorus
- Timisha Swan – choir, chorus
- Peter Thomas – cello
- Olga Tuzhilkov – viola
- Andrea Wagoner – violin
- Warren Wiegratz – flute, tenor saxophone
- Courtney Williams – choir, chorus
- Troy Sharon Willingham – choir, chorus
- Benjamin Wright – horn arrangements, string arrangements
- Adrien Zltoun – cello

Technical

- Brian Avnet – management
- Michael Bliesner – assistant engineer
- Donna Caseine – publishing
- Julia DeCiantis – booking
- Zach Iser – booking
- Liza Joseph – administration
- Sean Jurewicz – assistant engineer
- Rob Katz – assistant engineer
- Mary March – management
- Nabil – photography
- Jim Reith – Pro-Tools
- David Renzer – publishing
- Trevor Sadler – mastering
- Mark Siegel – booking
- Kevin Sucher – administration, engineer, instrumentation, keyboards, mixer, production consultant, sound consultant
- Paul Tavenner – assistant engineer
- Steven Valenzuela – assistant engineer
- Ellen Wakayama – creative director
- Meg White – booking
- Denise A. Williams – creative director
- Shelley Wiseman – administration, management
- Biju Zimmerman – assistant engineer

== Charts ==
Chart (2010)	Peak position
US Billboard 200	33
US Top R&B/Hip-Hop Albums (Billboard)	8
