= Tim Blixseth =

American real estate and timber baron

- Born: April 27, 1950 (age 76); Roseburg, Oregon, U.S.
- Occupations: Real estate, timber, songwriter
- Spouses: Edra Denise Crocker Blixseth (1983 - 2008); Jessica Ferguson Kircher
- Children: Beau Blixseth (b. 1979); Morgan Blixseth-Luccio(b. 1981)

Timothy Lee Blixseth (born 1950) is an American real estate developer, record producer, songwriter and timber baron. He was a co-founder of the Yellowstone Club in Montana. In 2006, Blixseth was featured in the Forbes 400 List of wealthiest Americans with a net worth of $1.3 billion. However, based on court records from his 2009 divorce, news reports estimated his 2011 net worth to have dropped to $200 million. By 2012, he faced a forced bankruptcy for failing to pay the state of Montana $57 million in income taxes and in 2014 he told the courts he was "too poor" to pay pending judgments and contempt findings for his fraud role in the Yellowstone Club bankruptcy.

Blixseth's wealth and assets have been the subject of controversy. In 2008, the bankruptcy of the Yellowstone Club led to extensive litigation with Blixseth and his creditors. The property emerged from bankruptcy under new ownership in 2009.

== Early life and education ==
According to Blixseth, he "grew up on welfare in Roseburg, Oregon". He attended Roseburg High School (Class of 1968) and after graduating, he worked in a sawmill. His parents were members of "a local cult" called Jesus Name of Oneness.

== Career ==
Blixseth began his business career using land swap deals and federal timber contracts.

=== Timber ===
Following bankruptcies in 1981 and 1986, Blixseth began to rebuild his timber business endeavors. In 1988, he co-founded Crown Pacific, LTD with Peter Stott and within a year he had $44 million in sales.

During this time, Blixseth was involved with three Oregon companies that defaulted on 22 national timber sale contracts owed the U.S. Forest Service more than $8 million. Two of Blixseth's timber companies, Capital Veneer and Capital Log Sales, filed for bankruptcy with debts totaling more than $16 million. A third company, Little River Box Co., was dissolved following two federal contract defaults. By 1992 Blixseth had sold his interests in Crown Pacific and launched Big Sky Lumber in Montana.

In 1995 Blixseth's Big Sky Lumber sold another 8,100 acres (33 km^{2}) to the U.S. Forest Service for $16.4 million and then swapped the remaining 101,000 acres (410 km^{2}) in checkerboard layout for 47,000 acres (190 km^{2}) contiguous and an additional $25 million. Following this final sale and swap, Blixseth dissolved the Big Sky Lumber partnership and divided up the proceeds, keeping 15,000 acres (61 km^{2}) and tens of millions in cash for himself. The cash and new acres became the foundation for Blixseth's Yellowstone Club project. Blixseth with Pittsburgh financier James J. Dolan also started the Spanish Peaks development, a high-end but somewhat less exclusive resort on neighboring property to the Yellowstone Club with land from the swap deal. Spanish Peaks announced it was closing and filing for bankruptcy in 2011. Between sales to timber interests, developers and the U.S. government, Blixseth's team grossed $56.9 million and 47,000 acres (190 km^{2}) of prime development real estate valued at over $100 million in less than three years from the date of their initial $27.5 million investment, of which Blixseth reportedly put less than $3 million.

=== Yellowstone Club, Greg LeMond and Credit Suisse controversy ===
With cash and land from his 1995 deal with the U.S. Forest Service, Blixseth began development of 15,000 acres (61 km^{2}) of pristine Montana real estate outside of Big Sky. Blixseth said to a Montana Bankruptcy court as "I started the club with a pick-up truck and a hammer."

In 2005, they took in over $200 million from the sales of building lots and memberships to wealthy business leaders, media icons and celebrities. Early Club members and investors included Bill Gates, Mary Hart, Dan Quayle and Steve Case. Leading to the Club's eventual financial failure was Blixseth's dealings with cyclist Greg LeMond. In 2002 LeMond, with four other family members and associates, invested in the Yellowstone Club. Each of the five partners paid Blixseth $750,000 for one percent shares in the exclusive resort. LeMond also purchased several building lots and maintained a property at the resort. LeMond and partners sued Blixseth in 2006 following reports of a Credit Suisse loan to the resort of $375 million from which Blixseth reportedly took $209 million in a disputed partial payout for his ownership stake. Blixseth said he used the money to expand the Yellowstone Club into the Yellowstone World Club. In 2006 Blixseth told the New York Times that he "paid cash, with no help from investors, for each of the properties that make up the Yellowstone World Club."

The Credit Suisse loan was based on a $1.16 billion Cushman & Wakefield valuation of the resort and for which LeMond and partners each sought $11.6 million for their one percent shares. LeMond settled his suit with the Blixseths for $39 million in 2007.

Blixseth appealed several aspects of the Yellowstone Club bankruptcy. The judge found Blixseth's claims unconvincing, noting, "Given the evidence, Blixseth's arguments are without support" and on March 6, 2013 U.S. District Court Judge Sam Haddon denied Blixseth's final appeal noting his lack of standing to revisit his rejected claims of "bad faith" in the bankruptcy reorganization." In December 2013 Judge Haddon ruled Blixseth in contempt for committing fraud and deception against the Court after it was revealed that in 2011 he had illegally sold-off assets frozen by an earlier court order to cover judgments against him in the Yellowstone Club bankruptcy proceedings.

=== Software ===
In 2006 the Blixseth's partnered with a computer software designer Dennis L. Montgomery, former Microsoft executive Michael Sandoval and former Congressman Jack Kemp to sell software they claimed could recognize patterns and objects hidden in video streams. They invested in several companies named Blxware, xPatterns, and OpSpring, and promoted their technology to the U.S. government as being able to identify hidden messages from Al-Qaeda terrorists in Al Jazeera broadcasts and find terrorists in pictures taken by CIA predator drones.

According to the New York Times, Mr. Kemp used his friendship with Vice President Dick Cheney to set up a meeting in 2006 at which Mr. Kemp, Montgomery and Ms. Blixseth met with a top Cheney adviser, Samantha Ravich, to talk about expanding the government's use of the Blxware software. Blixseth reportedly sought to sell the software to the government for $100 million; however, investigations later revealed it to be a "hoax" with CIA officials reporting they knew the technology to be fake as early as 2003.

The software was reportedly responsible for false terror alerts which grounded international flights and caused Department of Homeland Security Secretary Tom Ridge to raise the government's security level. In February 2006, the FBI opened an economic espionage and theft of intellectual property investigation. The U.S. Air Force office of Special Investigations also investigated. Bloomberg news reported that Blixseth family attorney Michael Flynn represented Edra Blixseth, Montgomery and Blxware against various charges until he claimed he learned the software "was a sham," characterized Montgomery as a "con man" and quit.

=== Songwriting ===
"Heart of America" is a charity single written by Blixseth and his wife, Edra Blixseth. The song became the anthem for the Today TV show's "Make a Difference" campaign to benefit the victims of 2005's Hurricane Katrina. The song was recorded by Wynonna Judd, Michael McDonald, and Eric Benet. In June 2006, Ebony magazine reported the song had raised $41 million with projected revenues of $100 million. In August 2006, The Desert Sun reported the song had generated $127 million in revenues for hurricane-relief charities.

== Litigation, bankruptcies and defaults ==
Blixseth's personal and professional life has had a number of lawsuits. Following Blixseth's claims that his legal issues are the result of government corruption and conspiracies against him, in 2010 Blixseth filed suit to have Federal Bankruptcy Judge Ralph Kischer removed from a case in which the judge issued a $40 million fraud judgement against him. Blixseth alleged the judge was biased against him and had conspired with Montana state government officials and the creditors suing Blixseth. The creditors, however, also disagree with the judge and have appealed his ruling claiming they are owed $286 million by Blixseth. In response to the conspiracy and bias charges, Judge Kirscher ruled against Blixseth's request for recusal noting, "This Court has not and will not succumb to any pressure, political or otherwise." Adding, Blixseth's "ultimate goal" appeared to be to upset prior rulings in the numerous cases against him pending various appeals.

In a separate bankruptcy case against Blixseth brought by California, Idaho and Montana tax officials in Nevada seeking tens of millions in allegedly unpaid taxes, Blixseth again claimed he was the victim of conspiracy and government corruption. "The state of Montana, the Montana Department of Revenue and their partners were in cahoots", Blixseth told the Associated Press, claiming Montana Governor Brian Schweitzer conspired with his ex-wife Edra, Yellowstone Club creditors and the tax authorities in three states seeking to bring him down. Blixseth added, "It's completely and absolutely provable, and we will be bringing all the facts out shortly." The state tax authorities, creditors and Governor Schweitzer all denied the conspiracy claims as "baseless allegations" having "no factual basis." In a subsequent press release by his attorney Mike Flynn, Blixseth claimed, "All parties who played any role in the forced bankruptcy will now be subject to depositions, including Montana Gov. Brian Schweitzer."

In June 2011 Blixseth filed suit against one of his personal attorneys for legal malpractice and personal injury associated with the Yellowstone Club bankruptcy. Blixseth sought $375 million in damages claiming his former personal attorney Stephen Brown conspired to "plot against" him in bankruptcy proceedings which found Blixseth had looted the club prior to passing it debt-ridden to his wife Edra Blixseth as part of their divorce. Brown denied the claims. Blixseth's claims were dismissed in March 2012 by U.S. District Judge Donald W. Molloy whose order noted, "The Bankruptcy Court addressed the Credit Suisse loan and the marital settlement agreement and concluded that (1) Mr. Blixseth fraudulently misappropriated the proceeds from the Credit Suisse loan and (2) the release in the marital settlement agreement was fraudulent." Blixseth's conspiracy and fraud allegations in the Yellowstone Club bankruptcy were vacated in July 2011 by the federal bankruptcy judge overseeing the case who ruled the accusations were previously addressed and found without merit. Blixseth then filed suit against Credit Suisse and their appraisal company claiming they deceived and mislead him into accepting some $300 million in loan payments which eventually led to the resort's bankruptcy. A claim to which Credit Suisse responded, "This is simply the latest attempt to shift blame to others and away from his own conduct" in a Bloomberg News report which added, "Blixseth had, among other things, been ordered to pay $40 million to creditors in 2010 when a federal judge pinned the financial collapse of the ultra-exclusive Yellowstone Club on a series of his fraudulent deals." Creditors are seeking an additional $286 million in alleged misappropriated funds which trustees claim Blixseth looted from the Yellowstone Club prior to its bankruptcy. Blixseth continues to fight these claims and seeks to have the various judgments against him vacated.

In December 2014 and again in April 2015 he was jailed for civil contempt for failing to pay court ordered sanctions and disclose what happened to assets the court had ordered held to pay his creditors. In July 2016, Blixseth was granted bail pending appeal and was released.

== Personal life ==
Tim Blixseth has two children, son Beau and daughter Morgan, from his third wife, Edra Crocker Blixseth, whom he married in 1981. Edra Denise Crocker, at the time, was a partner in a local Roseburg-based hotel and restaurant business called Choo-Choo Willy's. Crocker had two children from previous marriages, Julie Barve and Matthew Crocker, whom Blixseth adopted. He then married his fourth wife Jessica T. Ferguson Kircher after his 2009 divorce. In 2016 Ferguson served Blixseth with divorce papers while he was serving jail time for contempt of court.

Blixseth's third divorce from wife Edra Denise Crocker was first touted in 2009 as a case study in amicable separations where the two hashed out their agreement over wine at a Hollywood hotel without attorneys. However, wife Edra and creditors later claimed Blixseth duped her into taking on debt-encumbered assets while keeping cash and siphoning off liquid assets for himself. The debt burden which accompanied Ms. Crocker's portion of the divorce settlement subsequently forced her and the Yellowstone Club business into bankruptcy.

While initially both were quoted amicably about each other and the divorce, the tide quickly changed as the details of Ms. Blixseth's newly acquired financial debts came to light. Commenting on her ex-husband, Ms. Blixseth told the New York Times in 2009, "I would rather feel the cold steel of a revolver in the roof of my mouth and pull the trigger than to ever think about living a day with that man again."
