= Primary Wave =

American music and entertainment company

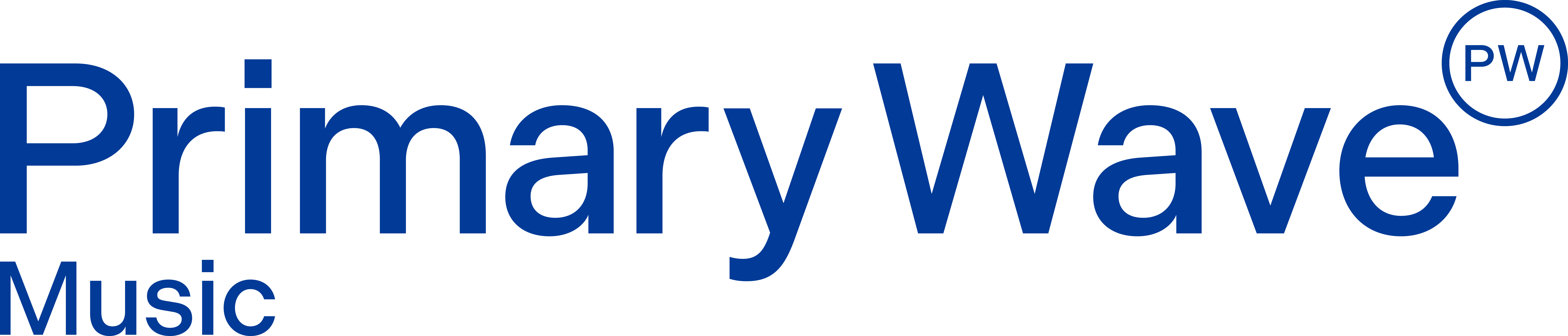
- Type: Private
- Industry: Music and entertainment
- Genre: Various
- Founded: 2006; 20 years ago, in the United States
- Founder: Lawrence Mestel
- Headquarters: New York City, New York, U.S.
- Number of locations: Austin; Los Angeles; Nashville; New York City; London
- Area served: Worldwide
- Key people: Lawrence Mestel (CEO); Adam Lowenberg (CMO); Ramon Villa (COO); Justin Shukat; Robert Dippold; Jane Reisman (CFO); Jeff Straughn; Natalia Nastaskin
- Services: Music publishing; Music rights management; Talent management; Digital marketing; Brand marketing; Film production
- Number of employees: 101
- Subsidiaries: Kobalt Music Group; Brand Synergy Group; Brightshop Digital Marketing
- Website: primarywave.com

Primary Wave is a privately held music publishing and talent management company. Primary Wave was founded in January 2006 by music executive Lawrence Mestel. Since its origin as a music publishing and administration company, Primary Wave has expanded into talent management, film and TV production, digital marketing, and branding. Primary Wave owns a significant song catalog, with major acquisitions beginning in 2016, including several hundred #1 hits.

== History ==
=== 2006–2015: Early years ===
Primary Wave Music Publishing was founded in 2006 after an introduction of Courtney Love to founder Lawrence Mestel, resulted in the purchase of 50% of Kurt Cobain's portion of the Nirvana catalog. The Nirvana purchase would eventually galvanize Primary Wave's acquisitions of the publishing catalogs of Chicago, Albert Hammond Jr., Bo Diddley, Steven Tyler, John Lennon, Lamont Dozier, Def Leppard and Maurice White of Earth, Wind & Fire.

In September 2013, Primary Wave and BMG Rights Management formed a joint venture for $150 million, with BMG buying a majority of Primary Wave's publishing, including "I Want to Hold Your Hand" by The Beatles, "Kiss on My List" by Hall & Oates, "How Sweet It Is" by Marvin Gaye, and "September" by Earth, Wind & Fire. The joint venture ended in 2016, though BMG kept the catalogues that it acquired from Primary Wave.

=== 2016–present: Acquisitions ===
Currently one of the largest indie music publishers in the United States, Primary Wave markets the copyrights of over 15,000 songs from the catalogs of various artists and songwriters.

The platform for a second phase of expansion was established in 2016, when Primary Wave received $300 million of funding from multiple large institutional investors, forming Primary Wave's first music-based fund. Primary Wave then purchased Smokey Robinson's catalogue for $25 million.

By 2017, Primary Wave acquired a stake in Rough Trade Publishing for $5 million and music catalogs such as Steve Cropper, Tom Cochrane, and Holly Knight.

In January 2018, Primary Wave acquired an 80 percent share in Chris Blackwell's Blue Mountain Music, one of the largest independent publishers, which included the rights to Bob Marley. The Blue Mountain Music acquisition also includes songs by Toots and the Maytals, Free, Burning Spear, Steel Pulse, and Marianne Faithfull. That same month, Primary Wave closed a marketing and publishing administration deal with Alice Cooper. In May 2019, Primary Wave closed a reported multi-million-dollar deal with British band Culture Club, led by front man Boy George. The acquisition included a portion of the band's publishing and master recording income stream.

Primary Wave entered into a marketing and licensing agreement with the Four Seasons Partnership to promote the catalog of the 1960s/1970s pop rock band The Four Seasons. In accordance with Four Seasons Partnership policy, surviving original members Frankie Valli and Bob Gaudio maintain ownership and final say over the catalog, with Gaudio maintaining an active coordination with Primary Wave, which a company representative noted was unusual compared to other bands.

Primary Wave announced an investment into Lava Media Group in September 2020. The new business relationship includes marketing and brand support from Primary Wave to support Lava's podcasts and also gives them access to Primary Wave's roster of talent. In November 2020, the Los Angeles Chapter of the Association of Independent Music Publishers (AIMP) announced Primary Wave as the recipient of its 2020 Indie Publisher of the Year award.

On January 28, 2021, Primary Wave acquired the catalogue of the rock and roll label Sun Records for $30 million, including recordings by Johnny Cash, Carl Perkins, and Jerry Lee Lewis. In August 2021, Primary Wave acquired a stake in Prince's music assets which include royalty streams from the songs "When You Were Mine," "I Wanna Be Your Lover," "1999," "Little Red Corvette," and "When Doves Cry".

In October 2022, Primary Wave received a significant investment from the asset management firm Brookfield. The firm set up a $1.7 billion fund to purchase copyrights to music, while taking a minority ownership stake in Primary Wave. The partnership's first purchase was the copyrights to Joey Ramone's songwriting. Reporting in the Wall Street Journal on the deal also revealed that Primary Wave at the time held 50,000 song copyrights and had around 80 employees. Several months after the Brookfield deal, Primary Wave made a large investment in the Indian music business Times Music, which the companies said would result in a joint venture of over $100 million.

In January 2023, Primary Wave acquired the catalogue of The Doors, including the rights to all of the band's recordings, trademarks, merchandise rights, and income.

In August 2023, it was announced Primary Wave had acquired the music publishing catalog rights for the majority of compositions written by Dennis DeYoung - founding member of the band, Styx. The deal included master recording rights for a majority of recordings featuring DeYoung’s performances.

Primary Wave struck a marketing and licensing agreement with Neil Sedaka in 2024 as part of the singer's efforts to promote the 50th anniversary of his comeback albums of the 1970s. Sedaka commented that he would not be writing new material for Primary Wave, because he believed he was no longer the caliber of songwriter he was at his peak.

In 2026, Variety reported that Primary Wave had acquired Britney Spears catalog and other rights.

March 2026, Primary Wave announced that it had entered into a definitive agreement to acquire independent music publishing and technology company, Kobalt, for $7 billion, with the deal expected to close in Q3 2026. Kobalt typically accounts for an estimated 35% of the U.S. and UK's top albums and songs. Once closed, Kobalt founder, Willard Ahdritz, will step down from his chairman board role.

== Divisions ==
Division	Formed	Description
Primary Wave Music Publishing	2006	Primary Wave Music Publishing (PWMP) is an independent, private music publisher who began with the acquisition of catalogs by Kurt Cobain (Nirvana), Steven Tyler (Aerosmith), and John Lennon (The Beatles/John Lennon).
Primary Wave Talent Management	2006	Primary Wave Talent Management (PWTM) works with music, film, TV, and entertainment personalities including Melissa Etheridge, Cypress Hill, CeeLo Green, Aly & AJ, Skillet, and Plain White T's.
Brand Synergy Group	2011	Brand Synergy Group (BSG) is a lifestyle consulting company that connects brands with entertainment, music, sports, and culinary personalities.
BrightShop Digital Marketing	2010	BrightShop is a digital marketing agency specializing in social, mobile, web, and streaming services. Acting as Primary Wave's in-house digital agency, BrightShop also services music, celebrity, and lifestyle brands.
