= List of logic journals =

This is a list of academic journals in logic.

- Annals of Mathematical Logic, Vols 1–23, 1970–1982.
- Annals of Pure and Applied Logic, 1983 ff. (Successor of the Annals of Mathematical Logic).
- Annals of the Japan Association for the Philosophy of Science, Tokyo 1956/1957 ff.
- Analysis, Oxford 1933/34 ff.
- Archiv für mathematische Logik und Grundlagenforschung, vols 1–26, Stuttgart-Berlin-Köln 1950–1987.
- Archive for Mathematical Logic, Berlin-Heidelberg 1988 ff. vol. 27 ff. (Successor of the former).
- Argumentation. An International Journal on Reasoning, Dordrecht 1987ff.
- Australasian Journal of Logic, Melbourne 2003 ff. Electronic Edition.
- Bulletin of the Section of Logic
- Dialectica. International Review of Philosophy of Knowledge/Revue Internationale de Philosophie de la Connaissance/Internationale Zeitschrift für Philosophie der Erkenntnis, Neuchâtel-Paris 1947 ff., Vols. 20 ff. Lausanne.
- Forschungen zur Logistik und zur Grundlegung der exakten Wissenschaften, Leipzig 1934–1943, Repr. in 1 vol. Hildesheim 1970.
- History and Philosophy of Logic, London 1979 ff.
- Informal Logic. Reasoning and Argumentation in Theory and Practice, 1990 ff
- International Journal of Logic and Computation 2010 ff.
- International Logic Review, Bologna 1970 ff.
- Journal of Applied Non-Classical Logics, 1991 ff.
- Journal of Automated Reasoning
- Journal of Logic and Analysis, 2009 ff. (Successor of Logic and Analysis).
- Journal of Logic and Computation, Oxford 1990 ff.
- Journal of Logic, Language and Information, 1992 ff.
- Journal of Logic Programming, (Elsevir Publ.) 1984–2000. Continued by Theory and Practice of Logic Programming and The Journal of Logic and Algebraic Programming.
- Journal of Mathematical Logic, 2001 ff.
- Journal of Non-Classical Logic, 1982–1991.
- Journal of Multiple-Valued Logic and Soft Computing, 1994 ff.
- Journal of Philosophical Logic, Toronto- Dordrecht 1972 ff.
- Journal of Symbolic Logic, Providence, Rhode Island 1936 ff.
- Linguistics and Philosophy
- Logic Journal of the IGPL, Oxford 1993 ff.
- Logic and Analysis, vol. 1, 2007–2008. Continued as Journal of Logic and Analysis.
- Logic and Logical Philosophy, Toruń 1993 ff.
- Logica Universalis
- Logical Analysis and History of Philosophy / Philosophiegeschichte und Logische Analyse, Bonn 1998 ff.
- Logique et Analyse, Nouvelle Serie, Löwen-Paris 1958 ff.
- Mathematical Logic Quarterly (MLQ), Weinheim 1993 ff. Successor of Zeitschrift für mathematische Logik und Grundlagen der Mathematik vols 1 –38, 1955–1992. In April 2025, the editorial board resigned and founded a new journal under the name Zeitschrift für mathematische Logik und Grundlagen der Mathematik, starting at volume 72, 2026.
- Methodos. Rivista trimestriale de Metodologia e di Logica Simbolica, Milano 1949 ff.
- Miscellanea Logica
- Modern Logic, vols 1–7, 1990–1997.
- Multiple-Valued Logic. An International Journal, 1996 ff.
- Nordic Journal of Philosophical Logic
- Notre Dame Journal of Formal Logic, Notre Dame, Ind., USA 1960 ff.
- Philosophia Mathematica. An International Journal for Philosophy of Modern Mathematics, Hauppauge, N. Y. 1964–1980/1981. 2nd Series 1986–1991 (6 vols). 3rd Series Oxford 1993 ff.
- Prace z Logiki, Kracow 1965 ff.
- Philosophiegeschichte und logische Analyse / Logical Analysis and History of Philosophy, Paderborn 1998 ff.
- Proceedings of the Aristotelian Society, London 1900 ff.
- Quality and Quantity. European Journal of Methodology, Bologna 1967 ff.
- Rassegna Internazionale di Logica / International Logic Review, Bologna 1970 ff.
- Rechtstheorie. Zeitschrift für Logik, Methodenlehre, Kybernetik und Soziologie des Rechts, Berlin- München 1970 ff.
- Revue d’historie des mathématiques, Marseille 1995 ff.
- Scripta Mathematica. A Quarterly Journal devoted to the Philosophy, History and Expository Treatment of Mathematics, New York 1932 ff.
- Studia Logica, Warszawa 1953 ff. Since vol. 54, Studia Logica. An International Journal for Symbolic Logic, Dordrecht 1995 ff. Studia Logica, Prague 1974 and 1975 (only 2 vols). Studies in Logic and the Foundations of Mathematics, Amsterdam 1951 ff.
- Synthese. An International Journal for Epistemology, Methodology, and Philosophy of Science, Bussum 1936; Vol. 11, 1959ff. Dordrecht .
- teorema, Valencia 1971 ff.
- The Bulletin of Symbolic Logic, 1995 ff.
- The Journal of Symbolic Logic, 1936 ff.
- The Review of Symbolic Logic, 2008 ff.
- Journal of Logic and Algebraic Programming, 2001 ff.
- Theoria (journal). Revista de Teoria, Historia y Fundamentos de la Ciencia, San Sebastian 1962 ff.
- Theory and Decision. An International Journal for Philosophy and Methodology of the Social Sciences, Dordrecht 1970 ff.
- Theory and Practice of Logic Programming, 2001 ff.
- Transactions on Computational Logic, ACM 2000 ff.
- Zeitschrift für allgemeine Wissenschaftstheorie, Wiesbaden 1970 ff, Journal for General Philosophy of Science / Zeitschrift für allgemeine Wissenschaftstheorie, Vol 21 ff, Dordrecht 1990 ff
- Zeitschrift für mathematische Logik und Grundlagen der Mathematik, vols. 1–38, Leipzig 1955–1992. Continued as Mathematical Logic Quarterly, vol. 39–71, 1993–2025. Continued further under its original name, vol. 72 ff, 2026 ff, published by the DVMLG.

== See also ==
- List of philosophy journals
