= Test the Nation =

Game show

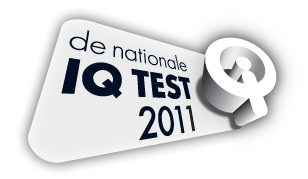
- Created by: Eyeworks Holding
- Years: 2001–2016

Miscellaneous
- Genre: Game show

Test the Nation is a television programme, first broadcast in 2001 by BNN in the Netherlands. The concept is owned by Eyeworks Holding who license it to TV production companies around the world.

== Show format ==
The format is designed to allow viewers to answer a number of questions in order to measure their IQ or their ability in some other 'intellectual' area. For instance, in the UK (where the show ran between 2002 and 2007) there have been editions of the show devoted to general knowledge, knowledge of the UK itself, and the English language. There is also an annual test of the year's events just before Christmas.

Typically there is a studio audience who answer the questions along with the viewer. The studio demography is broken down into categories often designed to challenge or affirm stereotypes. For example, in the United Kingdom, white-van men and fashion models are commonly thought to be less intelligent, whilst doctors and scientists are expected to score highly. The fun is in comparing your score against your compatriots. There is also a group of celebrities pitting their wits against the audience, and one or more 'experts', who comment on aspects of the particular show's topic.

== International versions ==
Country	Local name	Presenter(s)	Channel	Broadcast
Australia	Test Australia: The National IQ Test	Eddie McGuire and Catriona Rowntree	Nine Network	2002–2003; 2010
Belgium (Flanders)	De Nationale IQ Test	Birgit Van Mol and Rob Vanoudenhoven	VTM	2007; 2012
Canada	Test the Nation	Wendy Mesley and Brent Bambury (1st–5th edition); Ron MacLean and Wendy Mesley (Test the Nation: Sports episode); George Stroumboulopoulos and Carole MacNeil (6th edition)	CBC	2007–2010
France	Le grand test	Benjamin Castaldi and Mac Lesggy (2002–2005); Stéphane Rotenberg and Mac Lesggy (2024–present)	M6	2002–2005; 2024–present
Germany	Der große IQ-Test; Test the Nation	Günther Jauch; Sonja Zietlow	RTL	2001–2004; 13 June 2022 – 6 August 2022
Ireland	Test the Nation: The National IQ Test	Miriam O'Callaghan and Ray D'Arcy; Miriam O'Callaghan and Craig Doyle	RTÉ One	5 June 2006 – 1 January 2007
Italy	Fratelli di Test	Carlo Conti	Rai 1	13 January 2007 – 27 February 2007; 18 March 2011
Japan	テスト・ザ・ネイション; Test the Nation	Ichiro Furutachi; Eiko Koike	TV Asahi	3 November 2003 – 6 May 2008
Netherlands (original format)	De Nationale IQ Test	Jeroen Pauw and Bridget Maasland (2001–2005); Jeroen Pauw and Patrick Lodiers (2006); Patrick Lodiers and Ruben Nicolai (2007–2008); Patrick Lodiers and Valerio Zeno (2009–2011; 2013–2014); Patrick Lodiers and Sophie Hilbrand (2012); Ruben Nicolai and Sophie Hilbrand (2015); Beau van Erven Dorens and Jeroen van Koningsbrugge (2016)	Nederland 2 (2001–2006); Nederland 1/NPO 1 (2007–2015); RTL 4 (2016)	2001–2016
New Zealand	Test the Nation: The New Zealand IQ	Lana Coc-Kroft and Simon Dallow	TV One	2003–2005
Spain	El gran test	Manu Carreño and Paula Vázquez (2002); Manu Carreño and Mónica Martínez (2003); Carlos Sobera and Silvia Jato (2004–2005); Carlos Sobera and Mónica Martínez (2006)	Antena 3	2002–2006
United Kingdom	Test the Nation	Anne Robinson and Phillip Schofield (2002–2006); Anne Robinson and Danny Wallace (2006–2007)	BBC One	2002–2007
United States	Test the Nation 2	Mark L. Walberg and Leeza Gibbons	Fox	9 June 2003 – 5 March 2004

The TV format has been sold in other countries like: Czech Republic, Denmark, Indonesia, Norway, Turkey and in the Middle East on the Arabic channel MBC1.

=== United Kingdom ===
The British version, made by Talent Television for the BBC, was originally presented by Anne Robinson and Phillip Schofield. It ran for 17 editions between 2002 and 2007. The BBC tests were devised and standardised by the academic Colin Cooper, of Queen's University Belfast, who was sometimes referred to on the programme as 'Sooperman Cooperman'.

Viewers could play along using interactive television, log onto the BBC website, or just use a pen and paper to keep score.

The first show, in May 2002, was an IQ test and the six groups of 50 studio participants included blondes, builders, publicans, teachers and students. They were pitted against a group of 10 celebrities including EastEnders star Adam Woodyatt, pop music presenter Jayne Middlemiss, Olympic athlete Jonathan Edwards and former Sunday Times editor and broadcaster Andrew Neil. The teachers came out on top. The last IQ test in the UK was shown on 27 August 2007, when the studio groups were reality show contestants, clairvoyants, surgeons, removal men, Robinsons, Wallaces and celebrities. In this episode Danny Wallace, a successful writer, made his first appearance as co-host. He replaced Phillip Schofield, who had joined ITV at the time. Experts who joined Dr Colin Cooper on the IQ test panel have included Sylvia Herbert, a director of British Mensa (2002 and 2003) and Baroness Susan Greenfield, scientist and polymath (2004).

Although there was usually an end-of-year test in the UK each year around Christmas, there wasn't one at the end of 2006. But at the start of 2007 there was a similar programme broadcast on BBC One called Your Country Needs You, presented by Patrick Kielty, with the same general format.

=== United States ===
The American version aired as a two-hour special on Fox TV on 9 June 2003 and on 5 March 2004 as Test the Nation 2. Hosted by Mark L. Walberg and Leeza Gibbons.

=== Ireland ===
Test the Nation: The National IQ Test is an RTÉ Television programme, based on the successful BBC concept, Test the Nation.

First airing on RTÉ One on 5 June 2006, the show follows the UK format almost identically. In studio, two presenters oversee proceedings, which feature 6 teams of 40 contestants from various sectors of society. Members of the public participate by SMS or via the internet. The Macromedia Flash applications used are identical to those used by the BBC. A trial version of the application appeared prior to the first quiz night, featuring 12 questions on a number of topics, including the Birmingham Six, the former occupants of the Grafton Street site now occupied by Brown Thomas, and which Irish alcohol company Salvatore Schillaci advertised for.

This version of Test the Nation covers the whole island of Ireland as opposed to just the Republic; thus there is overlap between the content of the RTÉ and BBC versions of the show. As opposed to the BBC system of division by nearest city (which let people in Ireland enter if they chose Belfast), RTÉ divide results by historical Irish county.

The first show
The show first aired on RTÉ One on 5 June 2006, with Miriam O'Callaghan and Ray D'Arcy overseeing proceedings. As well as historical Irish counties, other questions asked for demographic division included the participants preference for tea or cappuccino, and their support for Roy Keane or Mick McCarthy during The Saipan Incident.

Their in-studio teams were Hairdressers, Football fans, an extended family from County Clare, employees of Revenue, Estate Agents, a collection of people who had done their Leaving Certificate in 1986, and the "RTÉ Allstars", a collection of RTÉ presenters including Eddie Hobbs and Charlie Bird.

The show was nominally part of, and the last show in, an RTÉ series The Time of Our Lives, covering the 20 years from 1986 to 2006, during which the Irish economy changed the country unrecognisably.

The second show
This aired on 1 January 2007 and was presented by Miriam again but this time Craig Doyle was her co-host. It was a test of the nation's IQ. It was revealed that the county with the highest IQ was Monaghan. Panelists included Neil Delamere, Cathy Kelly and Aoibhinn Ní Shúilleabháin.

=== Canada ===
Test the Nation debuted in Canada 18 March 2007 on the Canadian Broadcasting Corporation with the episode Test the Nation: IQ. A second episode called Test the Nation: Watch Your Language was broadcast on 9 September 2007, a third episode aired on 20 January 2008, called Test the Nation: Trivia, and a fourth episode Test the Nation: Sports aired on Sunday 25 May at 8 pm (8:30 NT) on CBC Television. A fifth episode Test the Nation: Canada Eh? aired on Sunday 7 September at 8 pm (8:30 NT) on CBC Television.

The sixth episode called "Test the Nation IQ" was broadcast on 24 January 2010 and was the second version of the IQ edition. People were tested on their IQ through a test that was designed by Professor James Parker from Trent University and Professor Don Saklofske. Celebrities that had their IQ's tested included Justin Trudeau, Dragon's Den's W. Brett Wilson and Our Lady Peace's Jeremy Taggart. In an interesting twist, Test the Nation had professional hypnotherapist Donald Currie hypnotize members of each team to see if hypnosis could help them achieve better IQ test scores. 1/3 of the hypnotized group did experience a jump in IQ score of up to 10 points.

The Canadian show was hosted by Wendy Mesley and Brent Bambury for the first five editions, except Test the Nation: Sports, which was hosted by Ron MacLean and Wendy Mesley. The sixth edition was hosted by George Stroumboulopoulos and Carole MacNeil.

In the Canadian version, celebrity guests are selected to represent one of six in-studio teams. The celebrity guests also take the test and the top celebrity's score is revealed on air. Test the Nation: Trivia featured celebrities: Farley Flex, Debbie Travis, Lorne Cardinal, Carlo Rota, Samantha Bee and Tricia Helfer. Test the Nation: Sports celebrity guests are Paul Coffey, Debra DiGiovanni, Alan Thicke, Brian Bailey, Victoria Pratt and Chris Murphy. All of the episodes were written by Kristeen von Hagen & George Westerholm and Edward Kay.

=== Australia ===
The Australian version, titled Test Australia: The National IQ Test, was the most viewed television show in Australia in 2002. Versions of the program aired in 2003 and again in 2010.

=== Italy ===
The Italian version, titled Fratelli di Test, was aired in Italy in 2007.

== Broadcast dates ==
=== UK ===
1. The National IQ Test (11 May 2002)
2. The National 2002 Test (23 December 2002)
3. The National Relationship Test (22 March 2003)
4. The National IQ Test 2003 (4 May 2003)
5. The National Quiz (6 September 2003)
6. The 2003 Test (22 December 2003)
7. The Great British Test (20 March 2004)
8. The National IQ Test 2004 (22 May 2004)
9. The Popular Music Test (4 September 2004)
10. The 2004 Test (19 December 2004)
11. The Big Entertainment Test (12 March 2005)
12. The 20th Century Test (4 June 2005)
13. Know Your English Test (8 October 2005)
14. The 2005 Test (18 December 2005)
15. Know Your Planet Test (29 May 2006)
16. The National IQ Test 2006 (2 September 2006)
17. The National IQ Test 2007 (27 August 2007)

=== Canada ===
1. Test the Nation: IQ (18 March 2007)
2. Test the Nation: Watch Your Language (9 September 2007)
3. Test the Nation: Trivia (20 January 2008)
4. Test the Nation: Sports (25 May 2008)
5. Test the Nation: Canada Eh? (7 September 2008)
6. Test the Nation: IQ (24 January 2010)
