= Colin Cooper (psychologist) =

British psychologist

Colin Cooper is a British psychologist and was a senior lecturer in the School of Psychology at Queen's University Belfast until 2012, when he took early retirement and moved to Picton, and latterly London Ontario, Canada. Cooper also devised the multiple-choice IQ tests for the BBC television programme Test the Nation. Among the questions, Cooper said that he had managed to "sneak in a few things that interested me", including questions "exploring the link between intelligence and genetics, height and the number of accidents they have had."

== Bibliography ==
=== Books ===
- Individual Differences and Personality (4th ed.) (2020)
- Psychological Testing: theory and practice (2019)
- Intelligence and Human Abilities (2015)
- Individual Differences and Personality (3rd ed.) (2010)
- Test the Nation: The IQ Book (2003)
- Individual Differences (2nd ed.) (2002)
- Intelligence and Abilities (2002)
- Individual Differences (1997)

=== Articles ===
- Cooper, C.; Rorison, B.N. (2001). "The Apperceptive Personality Test located in personality space". Personality and Individual Differences. 30 (2): 363–366. doi:10.1016/S0191-8869(00)00018-0.
- Saggino, A.; Cooper, C.; Kline, P. (2001). "A confirmatory factor analysis of the Myers-Briggs type indicator". Personality and Individual Differences. 30 (1): 3–9. doi:10.1016/S0191-8869(00)00004-0.
- Al Quran F., Clifford, T., Cooper, C., Lamey, P.-J. (2001). "Influence of psychological factors on the acceptance of complete dentures". Gerodontology. 18 (1): 35–40. doi:10.1111/j.1741-2358.2001.00035.x. PMID 11813387.
- Cooper, C. (2001). "Differential Psychology Section". The Psychologist. 14 (1): 15–16.
- Cooper, C.; Berwick, S. (2001). "Factors affecting psychological well-being of three groups of suicide-prone prisoners". Current Psychology. 20 (2): 169–182. doi:10.1007/s12144-001-1025-0. S2CID 143654068.
- Al-Omiri, M.K.; Clifford, T.J.; Lamey, P.-J.; Cooper, C. (2002). "Relation between psychology and satisfaction with dental appearance in tooth wear patients". Eur J Prosthodont Restor Dent. 14 (4): 179–84. PMID 17205954.
- Cooke C.A., Cooper, C., Dowds, E., Frazer, D.G., Jackson, A.J. (2003). "Keratoconus, myopia and personality". Cornea. 22 (3): 239–242. doi:10.1097/00003226-200304000-00011. PMID 12658090. S2CID 12823236.
- McRorie, M.; Cooper, C. (2003). "Neural transmission and general mental ability". Learning and Individual Differences. 30 (4): 335–338. doi:10.1016/s1041-6080(03)00013-x.
