= De Gruyter Brill =

German academic publisher

De Gruyter GmbH
- Parent company: De Gruyter Brill
- Founded: 1749; 277 years ago
- Founder: Georg Reimer
- Country of origin: Germany
- Headquarters location: Berlin
- Distribution: HGV (most of world); TriLiteral (Americas Books); EBSCO (US journals)
- Key people: Carsten Buhr (CEO)
- Imprints: De Gruyter Mouton; De Gruyter Saur; Birkhäuser; De Gruyter Akademie; De Gruyter Oldenbourg
- Revenue: €63 million (2017)
- No. of employees: c. 350
- Official website: www.degruyterbrill.com

Walter de Gruyter GmbH, known as De Gruyter Brill (German: [də ˈɡʁɔʏtɐ]), is a German scholarly publishing house specializing in academic literature.

Known as De Gruyter until 2024, it merged its operations with those of the Dutch publisher Brill Publishers, forming De Gruyter Brill.

== History ==
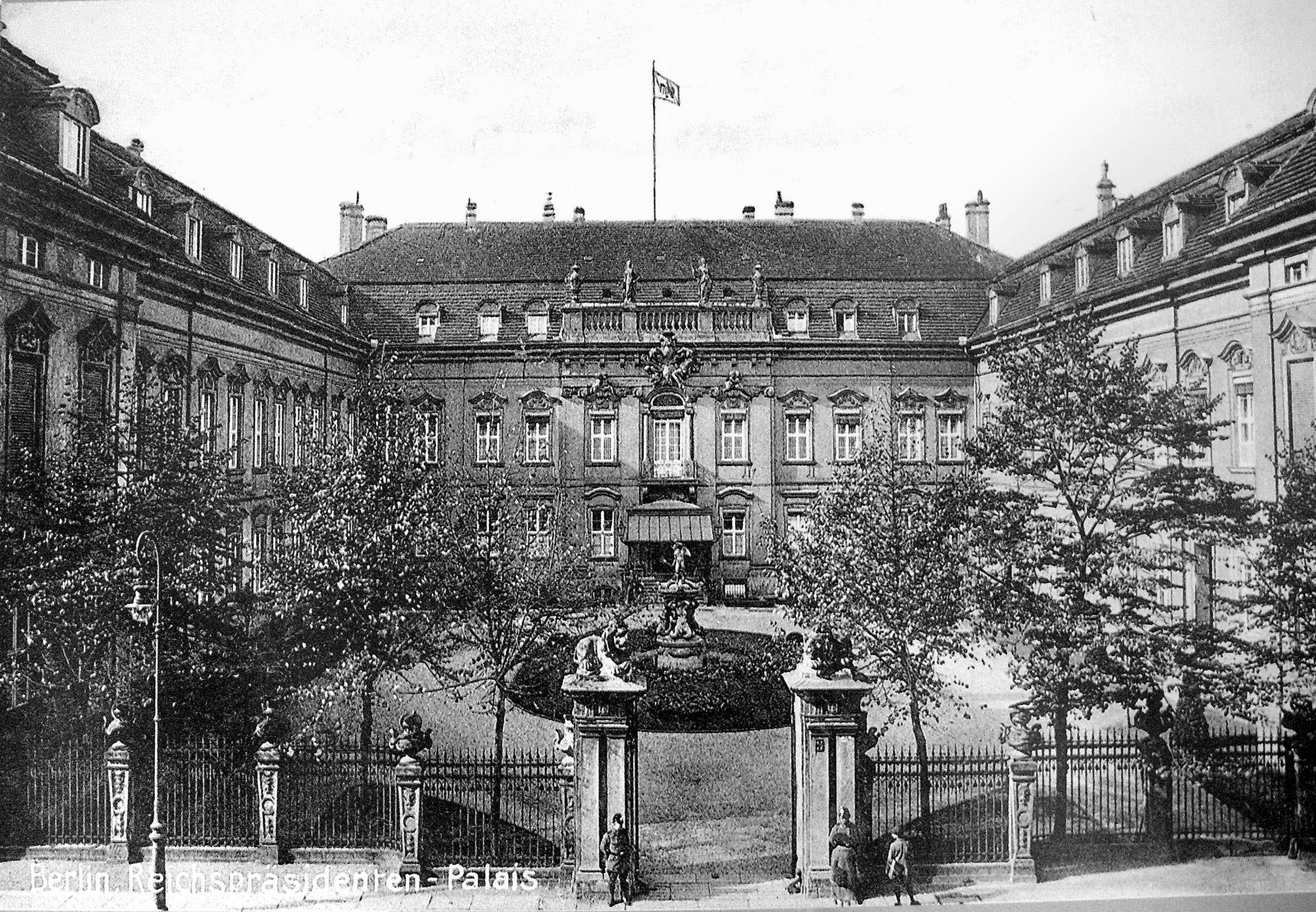
The palais at Wilhelmstraße No. 73, original headquarters of the company, c. 1920

The roots of the company go back to 1749 when Frederick the Great granted the Königliche Realschule in Berlin the royal privilege to open a bookstore and "to publish good and useful books". In 1800, the store was taken over by Georg Reimer (1776–1842), operating as the Reimer'sche Buchhandlung from 1817, while the school's press eventually became the Georg Reimer Verlag. From 1816, Reimer used a representative palace at Wilhelmstraße 73 in Berlin for his family and the publishing house, whereby the wings contained his print shop and press. The building later served as the Palace of the Reich President.

Born in Ruhrort in 1862, Walter de Gruyter took a position with Reimer Verlag in 1894. By 1897, at the age of 35, he had become sole proprietor of the hundred-year-old company then known for publishing the works of German romantics such as Johann Gottlieb Fichte, Friedrich Schleiermacher, and Heinrich von Kleist. De Gruyter later acquired four other publishing houses – Göschen, Guttentag, Trübner, and Veit – and, in 1919, merged them into one: Vereinigung wissenschaftlicher Verleger Walter de Gruyter & Co., located in Genthiner Straße, where it is still headquartered today. The four publishers specialized in philosophy, theology, German literature, medicine, mathematics, engineering, law, political science, and natural science, and it is for many classics in these fields that de Gruyter is still known today. By the time he died in 1924, Walter de Gruyter had created one of the largest modern publishing houses in Europe. De Gruyter's son-in-law, Herbert Cram (1893–1967) succeeded him in the management of the company and it continues to be family-owned.

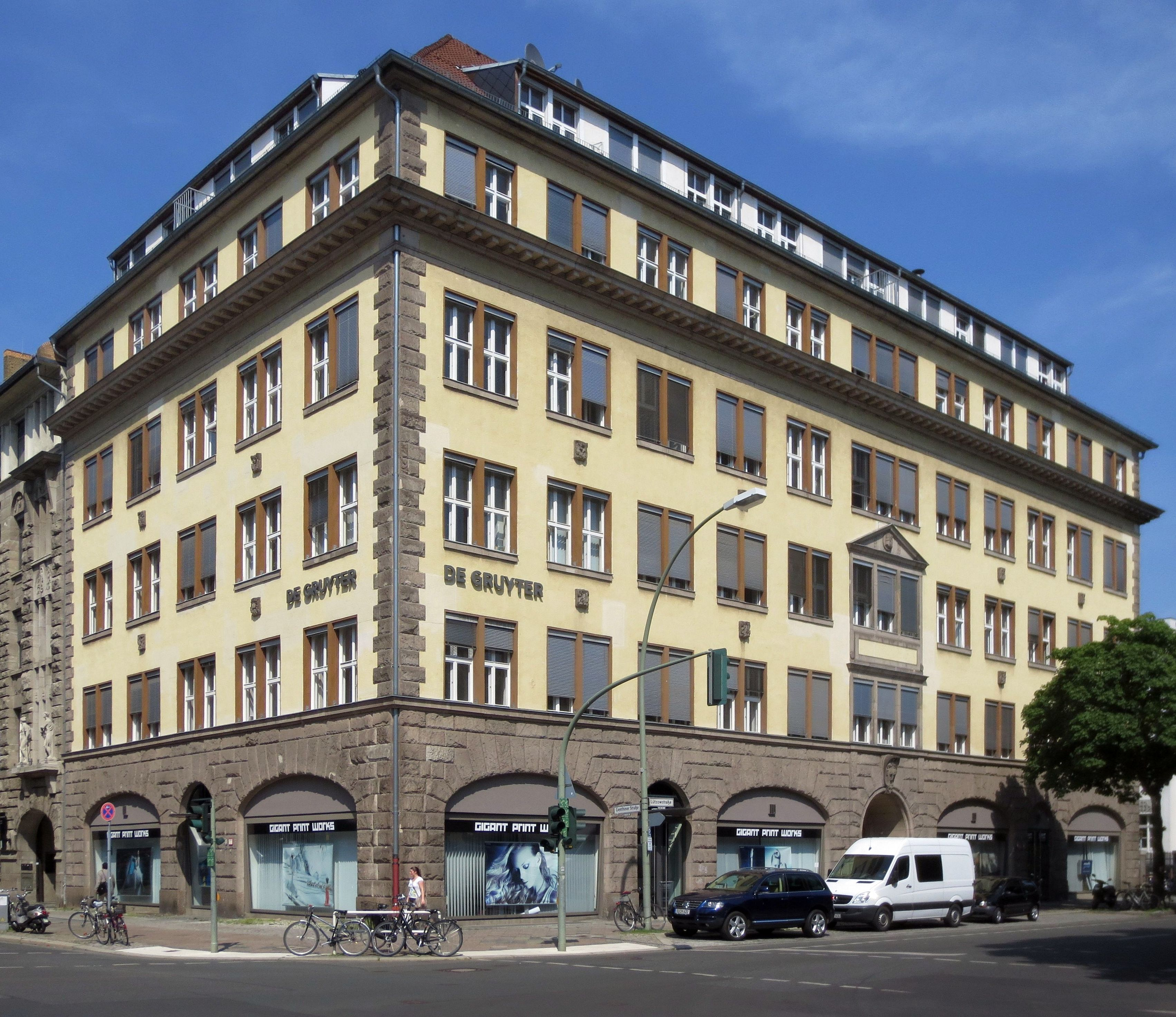
The company's headquarters in Berlin (2011)

During World War II, the roof and top floor of the de Gruyter building were destroyed and the basement warehouse flooded, but the building itself survived. On 14 May 1945, the publisher again registered for trading and was the first publisher in the British zone to receive a license. The company became Walter de Gruyter GmbH in 2012. In addition to its headquarters in Berlin, De Gruyter maintains offices around the globe, namely in Munich, Vienna, Basel, Warsaw, Boston, and Beijing.

In October 2023, it was announced that De Gruyter would acquire the Dutch publisher Brill for €51.1 million, forming the new company De Gruyter Brill, by the second quarter of 2024.

== Imprints and partnerships ==
Several former publishing houses have become imprints of De Gruyter:

- "De Gruyter Mouton/De Gruyter Saur" (formerly "Mouton de Gruyter") was purchased by de Gruyter in 1977. It was originally known as Mouton Publishers and based in The Hague. The imprint specializes in the field of linguistics and publishes academic journals, research monographs, reference works, multimedia publications, and bibliographies.
- K. G. Saur Verlag, based in Munich, was acquired in 2006 and retains the imprint "De Gruyter Saur". It specializes in reference information for libraries.
- De Gruyter acquired the journals of Berkeley Electronic Press in 2011.
- After filing for bankruptcy protection in 2012, publisher Birkhäuser was acquired by De Gruyter.
- In 2012 De Gruyter also acquired the open access publisher Versita. From 2014 until 2018, Versita was fully integrated into the imprint "De Gruyter Open", which also hosted several so-called mega journals and a blog, OpenScience, on open access in academia, reflecting the growing popularity of open access among researchers and academic institutions. In 2018, De Gruyter Open was relaunched as Sciendo.
- In 2013 De Gruyter acquired two academic publishers from Cornelsen Verlag: Oldenbourg Wissenschaftsverlag and Akademie Verlag.
- In 2019, De Gruyter acquired Jovis Verlag.

De Gruyter is one of thirteen publishers to participate in the Knowledge Unlatched pilot, a global library consortium approach to funding open access books. The publisher also undertakes major long-term scholarly projects such as the Oßmannstedter Ausgabe, the complete critical edition of Christoph Martin Wieland's works.

== See also ==
- Berkeley Electronic Press
- Books published by de Gruyter
- Journals published by de Gruyter
- Open access in Germany
