= Eduardo Fermé =

Argentinian computer scientist

- Born: 10 November 1964 (age 61); Buenos Aires, Argentina
- Education: Universidad de Buenos Aires, Kungliga Tekniska högskolan
- Known for: Logic of Theory Change / Belief Revision
- Scientific career
- Fields: Computer Science
- Workplaces: Universidade da Madeira
- Thesis: Revising the AGM Postulates (1999) On the Logic of Theory Change: Extending the AGM Model (2011) (1999)
- Doctoral advisor: Carlos Alchourrón and Sven Ove Hansson (Computer Science) - John Cantwell (Philosophy)

Eduardo Fermé is an Argentinian computer scientist and philosopher known for his work in belief revision and non monotonic reasoning. He is Full Professor at the University of Madeira.

== Career ==
Fermé studied Computer Science at the Universidad de Buenos Aires, graduating in 1991. After that, he obtained a doctoral degree in Computer Science from the Universidad de Buenos Aires under supervision of Carlos Alchourrón and Sven Ove Hansson in 1999. In 2011 he obtained a doctoral degree in philosophy from the Kungliga Tekniska högskolan under supervision of John Cantwell. He has more than 90 publications in the area of belief revision, including the books Belief Change: Introduction and Overview with Sven Ove Hansson and Non-prioritized Belief Change with Marco Garapa and Mauricio D.L. Reis. He has delivered invited talks, keynote lectures and tutorials at universities and international conferences in Europe, North America, Latin America, Africa, Asia and Oceania, including ECSQARU 2023, Cape-KR 2024, PRICAI 2019 and the Brazilian Logic Conference 2017. He has also presented tutorials at IJCAI, ECAI and KR.

He was Professor at the Universidad de Buenos Aires from 1997 to 2002. Since 2002 is Professor at the University of Madeira. He is the founder of the NOVA LINCS Pole at the University of Madeira and served as its coordinator from 2020 to 2022. Fermé served on the Steering Committee of the International Workshop on Nonmonotonic Reasoning (NMR) from 2018 to 2024, and chaired the committee from 2022 to 2023. In 2026, he was appointed as one of the two Program Chairs of the 2027 International Conference on Principles of Knowledge Representation and Reasoning (KR), one of the leading international conferences in Knowledge Representation and Reasoning. Fermé served on the Steering Committee of KR Inc. from 2022 to 2023, was a member of its Advisory Committee from 2023 to 2026, and rejoined the Steering Committee in 2026.. He is a member of the editorial board of the Journal of Applied Logics, CAAI Transactions on Intelligence Technology and Journal Argument and Computation.
