= Elsevier =

Dutch publishing and analytics company

- Type: Subsidiary
- Industry: Data analytics (secondary: publishing)
- Founded: 1880; 146 years ago
- Headquarters: Amsterdam, Netherlands
- Key people: Kumsal Bayazit, Chief Executive Officer
- Revenue: £2.714 billion (2025)
- Operating income: £1.035 billion (2025)
- Net income: $2.723 billion (2025)
- Number of employees: 9,500
- Parent: RELX
- Website: www.elsevier.com

Elsevier, Inc. (/ˈɛlsəvɪər/ EL-sə-veer) is a Dutch academic publishing company specializing in scientific, technical, and medical content. Its products include journals such as The Lancet, Cell, the ScienceDirect collection of electronic journals, Trends, the Current Opinion series, the online citation database Scopus, the SciVal tool for measuring research performance, the ClinicalKey search engine for clinicians, and the ClinicalPath evidence-based cancer care service. Elsevier's products and services include digital tools for data management, instruction, research analytics, and assessment. Elsevier is part of the RELX Group, known until 2015 as Reed Elsevier, a publicly traded company. According to RELX reports, in 2022 Elsevier published more than 600,000 articles annually in over 2,800 journals. As of 2018, its archives contained over 17 million documents and 40,000 e-books, with over one billion annual downloads.

As of 2019, Elsevier's about page no longer describes the company as a publisher, but as a "global information analytics business", with only their "roots in publishing".

Elsevier has been criticized for its high profit margins and copyright practices. The company had a reported profit before tax of £2.295 billion with an adjusted operating margin of 33.1% in 2023. Much of the research that Elsevier publishes is publicly funded; its high costs have led to accusations of rent-seeking, boycotts against the company, and the rise of alternate avenues for academic publication and access, such as preprint servers and shadow libraries.

== History ==
The original seal of the Elzevir family is used by Elsevier as its logo.

Elsevier was founded in 1880 and adopted the name and logo from the Dutch publishing house Elzevir that was an inspiration but has no connection to the contemporary Elsevier. The Elzevir family operated as booksellers and publishers in the Netherlands; the founder, Lodewijk Elzevir (1542–1617), lived in Leiden and established that business in 1580. As a company logo, Elsevier used the Elzevir family's printer's mark, a tree entwined with a vine and the words Non Solus, which is Latin for "not alone". According to Elsevier, this logo represents "the symbiotic relationship between publisher and scholar".

The expansion of Elsevier in the scientific field after 1945 was funded with the profits of the newsweekly Elsevier, which published its first issue on 27 October 1945. The weekly was an instant success and very profitable. The weekly was a continuation, as is stated in its first issue, of the monthly Elsevier, which was founded in 1891, was forced to stop publication in December 1940 because of the German occupation of the Netherlands.

In May 1939, Klautz established the Elsevier Publishing Company Ltd. in London to distribute these academic titles in the British Commonwealth (except Canada). When the Nazis occupied the Netherlands for the duration of five years from May 1940, he had just founded a second international office, the Elsevier Publishing Company Inc. in New York City. In 1947, Elsevier began publishing its first English-language journal, Biochimica et Biophysica Acta.

In 1970, Elsevier acquired competing firm North Holland Publishing Co. In 1971 the firm acquired Excerpta Medica, a small medical abstract publisher based in Amsterdam. As the first and only company in the world that employed a database for the production of journals, it introduced computer technology to Elsevier. In 1978 Elsevier merged with Dutch newspaper publisher NDU, and devised a strategy to broadcast textual news to people's television sets through Viewdata and Teletext technology.

In 1979, Elsevier Science Publishers launched the Article Delivery Over Network Information System (ADONIS) project in conjunction with four business partners. The project aims to find a way to deliver scientific articles to libraries electronically, and would continue for over a decade. In 1991, in conjunction with nine American universities, Elsevier's The University Licensing Project (TULIP) was the first step in creating published, copyrighted material available over the Internet. It formed the basis for ScienceDirect, launched six years later. In 1997, after almost two decades of experiments, ScienceDirect was launched as the first online repository of electronic (scientific) books and articles. Though librarians and researchers were initially hesitant regarding the new technology, more and more of them switched to e-only subscriptions.

In 2004, Elsevier launched Scopus - a multidisciplinary metadata database of scholarly publications, only the second of such kind (after the Web of Science, although free Google Scholar was also launched in 2004). Scopus covers journals, some conference papers and books from various publishers, and measures performance on both author and publication levels. In 2009 SciVal Spotlight was released. The tool enabled research administrators to measure their institution's relative standing in terms of productivity, grants, and publications.

In 2013, Elsevier acquired Mendeley, a UK company making software for managing and sharing research papers. Mendeley, previously an open platform for sharing of research, was greatly criticized for the sale, which users saw as acceding to the "paywall" approach to research literature. Mendeley's previously open-sharing system now allows exchange of paywalled resources only within private groups. The New Yorker described Elsevier's reasons for buying Mendeley as two-fold: to acquire its user data, and to "destroy or coöpt an open-science icon that threatens its business model".

== Operations ==
=== Company statistics ===
During 2018, researchers submitted over 1.8 million research papers to Elsevier-based publications. Over 20,000 editors managed the peer review and selection of these papers, resulting in the publication of more than 470,000 articles in over 2,500 journals. Editors are generally unpaid volunteers who perform their duties alongside a full-time job in academic institutions, although exceptions have been reported. In 2013, the five editorial groups Elsevier, Springer, Wiley-Blackwell, Taylor & Francis, and SAGE Publications published more than half of all academic papers in the peer-reviewed literature. At the time, Elsevier accounted for 16% of the world market in science, technology, and medical publishing. In 2019, Elsevier accounted for the review, editing and dissemination of 18% of the world's scientific articles. About 45% of revenue by geography in 2019 derived from North America, 24% from Europe, and the remaining 31% from the rest of the world. Around 84% of revenue by format came from electronic usage and 16% came from print.

The firm employs 8,100 people. The CEO is Kumsal Bayazit, who was appointed on 15 February 2019. In 2018, it reported a mean 2017 gender pay gap of 29.1% for its UK workforce, while the median was 40.4%, the highest yet reported by a publisher in UK. Elsevier attributed the result to the under-representation of women in its senior ranks and the prevalence of men in its technical workforce. The UK workforce consists of 1,200 people in the UK, and represents 16% of Elsevier's global employee population. Elsevier's parent company, RELX, has a global workforce that is 51% female to 49% male, with 43% female and 57% male managers, and 29% female and 71% male senior operational managers.

In 2018, Elsevier accounted for 34% of the revenues of RELX group (£2.538 billion of £7.492 billion). In operating profits, it represented 40% (£942 million of £2,346 million). Adjusted operating profits (with constant currency) rose by 2% from 2017 to 2018. Profits grew further from 2018 to 2019, to a total of £982 million. The first half of 2019, RELX reported the first slowdown in revenue growth for Elsevier in several years: 1% vs. an expectation of 2% and a typical growth of at least 4% in the previous 5 years. Overall for 2019, Elsevier reported revenue growth of 3.9% from 2018, with the underlying growth at constant currency at 2%. In 2019, the company accounted for 34% of the revenues of RELX (£2.637billion of £7.874billion). In adjusted operating profits, it represented 39% (£982m of £2.491bn). Adjusted operating profits (with constant currency) rose by 2% from 2018 to 2019. In 2019, researchers submitted over two million research papers to Elsevier-based publications. Over 22,000 editors managed the peer review and selection of these papers, resulting in the publication of about 500,000 articles in over 2,500 journals.

In 2020, Elsevier was the largest academic publisher, with approximately 16% of the academic publishing market and more than 3000 journals.

=== Imprints ===
Elsevier uses its imprints (that is, brand names used in publishing) to market to different consumer segments. Many of the imprints have previously been the names of publishing companies which were purchased by Reed Elsevier.

- Academic Press
- Baillière Tindall
- BC Decker
- Butterworth–Heinemann
- CMP
- Cell Press
- Churchill Livingstone
- Digital Press
- Elsevier
- Gulf Professional Publishing
- GW Medical Publishing
- Hanley & Belfus
- Masson
- Medicine Publishing
- Morgan Kaufmann Publishers
- Mosby
- Newnes
- North-Holland Publishing Company
- Pergamon Press
- Pergamon Flexible Learning
- Saunders
- Syngress
- Urban & Fischer
- William Andrew
- Woodhead Publishing (including Chandos and Horwood)

=== Conferences ===
Elsevier conducts conferences, exhibitions, and workshops around the world with over 50 conferences a year covering life sciences, physical sciences and engineering, social sciences, and health sciences.

== Market model ==
=== Products and services ===
Products and services include electronic and print versions of journals, textbooks and reference works, and cover the health, life, physical, and social sciences.

The target markets are academic and government research institutions, corporate research labs, booksellers, librarians, scientific researchers, authors, editors, physicians, nurses, allied health professionals, medical and nursing students and schools, medical researchers, pharmaceutical companies, hospitals, and research establishments. It publishes in 13 languages including English, German, French, Spanish, Italian, Portuguese, Polish, Japanese, Hindi, and Chinese.

Flagship products and services include VirtualE, ScienceDirect, Scopus, Scirus, EMBASE, Engineering Village, Compendex, Cell, Knovel, SciVal, Pure, and Analytical Services, The Consult series (FirstCONSULT, PathCONSULT, NursingCONSULT, MDConsult, StudentCONSULT), Virtual Clinical Excursions, and major reference works including Gray's Anatomy, Nelson Pediatrics, Dorland's Illustrated Medical Dictionary, Netter's Atlas of Human Anatomy, and online versions of many journals including The Lancet.

ScienceDirect is Elsevier's platform for online electronic access to its journals and over 40,000 e-books, reference works, book series, and handbooks. The articles are grouped in four main sections: Physical Sciences and Engineering, Life Sciences, Health Sciences, and Social Sciences and Humanities. For most articles on the website, abstracts are freely available; access to the full text of the article (in PDF, and also HTML for newer publications) often requires a subscription or pay-per-view purchase.

In 2019, Elsevier published 49,000 free open access articles and 370 full open access journals. Moreover, 1,900 of its journals sold hybrid open access options.

=== Pricing ===
The subscription rates charged by the company for its journals have been criticized; some very large journals (with more than 5,000 articles) charge subscription prices as high as £9,634, far above average, and many British universities pay more than a million pounds to Elsevier annually. The company has been criticized not only by advocates of a switch to the open-access publication model, but also by universities whose library budgets make it difficult for them to afford current journal prices.

For example, in 2004, a resolution by Stanford University's senate singled out Elsevier's journals as being "disproportionately expensive compared to their educational and research value", which librarians should consider dropping, and encouraged its faculty "not to contribute articles or editorial or review efforts to publishers and journals that engage in exploitive or exorbitant pricing". Similar guidelines and criticism of Elsevier's pricing policies have been passed by the University of California, Harvard University, and Duke University.

In July 2015, the Association of Universities in the Netherlands threatened to boycott Elsevier, which refused to negotiate on any open access policy for Dutch universities. After a year of negotiation, Elsevier pledged to make 30% of research published by Dutch researchers in Elsevier journals open access by 2018. In October 2018, a complaint against Elsevier was filed with the European Commission, alleging anticompetitive practices stemming from Elsevier's confidential subscription agreements and market dominance. The European Commission decided not to investigate.

The elevated pricing of field journals in economics, most of which are published by Elsevier, was one of the motivations that moved the American Economic Association to launch the American Economic Journal in 2009.

=== Mergers and acquisitions ===
RELX Group has been active in mergers and acquisitions. Elsevier has incorporated other businesses which were either complementing or competing in the field of research and publishing and that reinforce its market power including Mendeley (after the closure of 2collab), SSRN, bepress/Digital Commons, PlumX, Hivebench, Newsflo, Science-Metrix, and Interfolio.

Elsevier's new business model resulting from these mergers and acquisitions has been described as "surveillance publishing" or "people farming."

=== Awards ===
Elsevier has partnered with a number of organisations and lent its name to several awards. Since 1987, Elsevier has partnered with the academic journal Spectrochimica Acta Part B to award the Elsevier / Spectrochimica Acta Atomic Spectroscopy Award. This award is given each year for a jury-selected best paper of the year. The award is worth $1000.

Starting in 1987, the IBMS Elsevier Award was awarded in 1992, 1995, 1998, 2001, 2003, 2005, and 2007 by the International Bone and Mineral Society in partnership with Elsevier, "for outstanding research and teaching throughout their career by an IBMS member in the fields of bone and mineral metabolism".

From 2007, the Coordenação de Aperfeicoamento de Pessoal de Nível Superior (CAPES) in Brazil partnered with Elsevier to award the CAPES Elsevier Award, the award being restricted to women from 2013 to encourage more women to pursue scientific careers. Several awards were awarded each year, as of 2014.

From 2011, the OWSD-Elsevier Foundation Awards for Early-Career Women Scientists in the Developing World (OWSD-Elsevier Foundation Awards) have been awarded annually to early-career women scientists in selected developing countries in four regions: Latin America and the Caribbean; East and Southeast Asia and the Pacific; Central and South Asia; and Sub-Saharan Africa. The Organization for Women in Science for the Developing World (OWSD), the Elsevier Foundation, and The World Academy of Sciences first partnered to recognize achievements of early-career women scientists in developing countries in 2011.

In 2016, the Elsevier Foundation awarded the Elsevier Foundation-ISC3 Green and Sustainable Chemistry Challenge. From 2021 and as of 2024, the annual award is known as the Elsevier Foundation Chemistry for Climate Action Challenge. Two prizes have been awarded each year; until 2020, the first prizewinner was awarded €50,000, and the second prize was €25,000. Since then, €25,000 has been awarded to each winner, usually an entrepreneur who has created a project or proposal that aids the fight against climate change.

=== Shill review offer ===
According to the BBC, in 2009, the firm [Elsevier] offered a £17.25 Amazon voucher to academics who contributed to the textbook Clinical Psychology if they would go on Amazon.com and Barnes & Noble (a large U.S. books retailer) and give it five stars. Elsevier responded, "Encouraging interested parties to post book reviews isn't outside the norm in scholarly publishing, nor is it wrong to offer to nominally compensate people for their time. But in all instances the request should be unbiased, with no incentives for a positive review, and that's where this particular e-mail went too far", and that it was a mistake by a marketing employee.

=== Blocking text mining research ===
Elsevier seeks to regulate text and data mining with private licenses, claiming that reading requires extra permission if automated and that the publisher holds copyright on output of automated processes. The conflict on research and copyright policy has often resulted in researchers being blocked from their work. In November 2015, Elsevier blocked a scientist from performing text mining research at scale on Elsevier papers, even though his institution already pays for access to Elsevier journal content. The data was collected using the R package "statcheck".

=== Fossil fuel company consulting and advocacy ===
Elsevier is one of the most prolific publishers of books aimed at expanding the production of fossil fuels. Since at least 2010 the company has worked with the fossil fuel industry to optimise fossil fuel extraction. It commissions authors, journal advisory board members and editors who are employees of the largest oil firms. In addition it markets data services and research portals directly to the fossil fuel industry to help "increase the odds of exploration success".

=== Others ===
In May 2026, major publishers including Elsevier sued Meta Platforms, alleging that Meta used their books and journal articles, without their permission, to train Llama.

== Business practices and editorial standards ==
=== "Who's Afraid of Peer Review" ===
In 2013, one of Elsevier's journals was caught in the sting set up by John Bohannon, published in Science, called "Who's Afraid of Peer Review?" The journal Drug Invention Today accepted an obviously bogus paper made up by Bohannon that should have been rejected by any good peer-review system. Instead, Drug Invention Today was among many open-access journals that accepted the fake paper for publication. As of 2014, this journal had been transferred to a different publisher.

=== Fake journals ===
At a 2009 court case in Australia where Merck & Co. was being sued by a user of Vioxx, the plaintiff alleged that Merck had paid Elsevier to publish the Australasian Journal of Bone and Joint Medicine, which had the appearance of being a peer-reviewed academic journal but in fact contained only articles favourable to Merck drugs. Merck described the journal as a "complimentary publication", denied claims that articles within it were ghost written by Merck, and said that the articles were all reprinted from peer-reviewed medical journals. In May 2009, Elsevier Health Sciences CEO Hansen released a statement regarding Australia-based sponsored journals, conceding that they were "sponsored article compilation publications, on behalf of pharmaceutical clients, that were made to look like journals and lacked the proper disclosures". The statement acknowledged that it "was an unacceptable practice". The Scientist reported that, according to an Elsevier spokesperson, six sponsored publications "were put out by their Australia office and bore the Excerpta Medica imprint from 2000 to 2005", namely the Australasian Journal of Bone and Joint Medicine (Australas. J. Bone Joint Med.), the Australasian Journal of General Practice (Australas. J. Gen. Pract.), the Australasian Journal of Neurology (Australas. J. Neurol.), the Australasian Journal of Cardiology (Australas. J. Cardiol.), the Australasian Journal of Clinical Pharmacy (Australas. J. Clin. Pharm.), and the Australasian Journal of Cardiovascular Medicine (Australas. J. Cardiovasc. Med.). Excerpta Medica was a "strategic medical communications agency" run by Elsevier, according to the imprint's web page. In October 2010, Excerpta Medica was acquired by Adelphi Worldwide.

=== Chaos, Solitons & Fractals ===
There was speculation that the editor-in-chief of Elsevier journal Chaos, Solitons & Fractals, Mohamed El Naschie, misused his power to publish his own work without appropriate peer review. The journal had published 322 papers with El Naschie as author since 1993. The last issue of December 2008 featured five of his papers. The controversy was covered extensively in blogs. The publisher announced in January 2009 that El Naschie had retired as editor-in-chief. As of November 2011 the co-Editors-in-Chief of the journal were Maurice Courbage and Paolo Grigolini. In June 2011, El Naschie sued the journal Nature for libel, claiming that his reputation had been damaged by their November 2008 article about his retirement, which included statements that Nature had been unable to verify his claimed affiliations with certain international institutions. The suit came to trial in November 2011 and was dismissed in July 2012, with the judge ruling that the article was "substantially true", contained "honest comment", and was "the product of responsible journalism". The judgement noted that El Naschie, who represented himself in court, had failed to provide any documentary evidence that his papers had been peer-reviewed. Judge Victoria Sharp also found "reasonable and serious grounds" for suspecting that El Naschie used a range of false names to defend his editorial practice in communications with Nature, and described this behavior as "curious" and "bizarre".

=== Plagiarism ===
Elsevier's 'Duties of Authors' says that authors should ensure that they have written entirely original works, and that proper acknowledgement of others' work must always be given. Elsevier claims plagiarism in all its forms constitutes unethical behaviour. Some Elsevier journals automatically screen submissions for plagiarism, but not all.

Albanian politician Taulant Muka claimed that Elsevier journal Procedia had plagiarized in the abstract of one of its articles. It is unclear whether or not Muka had access to the entirety of the article.

=== Scientific racism ===
Angela Saini has criticized the two Elsevier journals Intelligence and Personality and Individual Differences for having included on their editorial boards such well-known proponents of scientific racism as Richard Lynn and Gerhard Meisenberg; in response to her inquiries, Elsevier defended their presence as editors. The journal Intelligence has been criticized for having "occasionally included papers with pseudoscientific findings about intelligence differences between races". It is the official journal of the International Society for Intelligence Research, which organizes the controversial series of conferences London Conference on Intelligence, described by the New Statesman as a forum for scientific racism.

In response to a 2019 open letter, efforts by Retraction Watch and a petition, on 17 June 2020 Elsevier announced it was retracting an article that J. Philippe Rushton and Donald Templer published in 2012 in the Elsevier journal Personality and Individual Differences. The article had claimed that there was scientific evidence that skin color was related to aggression and sexuality in humans.

=== Manipulation of bibliometrics ===
According to the signatories of the San Francisco Declaration on Research Assessment (see also Goodhart's law), commercial academic publishers benefit from manipulation of bibliometrics and scientometrics, such as the journal impact factor. The impact factor, which is often used as a proxy of prestige, can influence revenues, subscriptions, and academics' willingness to contribute unpaid work. However, there's evidence suggesting that reliability of published research works in several fields may decrease with increasing journal rank.

Nine Elsevier journals, which exhibited unusual levels of self-citation, had their journal impact factor of 2019 suspended from Journal Citation Reports in 2020, a sanction that hit 34 journals in total.

In 2023, the International Journal of Hydrogen Energy, which is published by Elsevier, was criticized for desk-rejecting a submitted article for the main reason that it did not cite enough articles from the same journal. One of their journals, Journal of Analytical and Applied Pyrolysis, was involved in the manipulation of the peer review report.

In 2024, "Scholarly Criticism", an academic research watchdog, reported on the impacts of the inclusion in Elsevier's Scopus of the megajournal Heliyon, which started publishing in 2015 and was attributed a CiteScore in 2016 or earlier.

=== Climate change ===
Elsevier publishes research by climate change researchers in many of its journals, but also publishes books for the fossil fuel industry about expanding production, as well as other products such as a geomapping tool to help find oil and gas reserves. Climate scientists are concerned that this conflict of interest could undermine the credibility of climate science because they believe that fossil fuel extraction and climate action are incompatible.

=== Involvement in international arms trade ===
Elsevier organized international arms fairs until 2007, when they announced they would no longer do so, after various protests and calls to boycott their journals.

=== Antitrust lawsuit ===
In September 2024, Lucina Uddin, a neuroscience professor at UCLA, sued Elsevier along with five other academic journal publishers in a proposed class-action lawsuit, alleging that the publishers violated antitrust law by agreeing not to compete against each other for manuscripts and by denying scholars payment for peer review services. In January 2026, the U.S. District Judge dismissed the suit on the basis that it did not "plausibly allege an unlawful agreement under antitrust laws". The plaintiffs, by the time of the dismissal, had not made specific, factual allegations in either their initial filing or their Opposition, despite requesting leave to amend. In fact, the plaintiffs explicitly indicated that they would not attempt to argue or demonstrate an explicit agreement between the publishers.

== Relationship with academic institutions ==
=== Finland ===
In 2015, Finnish research organizations paid a total of 27 million euros in subscription fees. Over one-third of the total costs went to Elsevier. The information was revealed after successful court appeal following a denied request on the subscription fees, due to confidentiality clauses in contracts with the publishers. Establishing that fact led to the creation of tiedonhinta.fi petition demanding more reasonable pricing and open access to content signed by more than 2800 members of the research community. While deals with other publishers have been made, it was not the case for Elsevier, leading to the nodealnoreview.org boycott of the publisher signed more than 600 times.

In January 2018, it was confirmed that a deal had been reached between those concerned.

=== France ===
The French Couperin consortium agreed in 2019 to a 4-year contract with Elsevier, despite criticism from the scientific community. The French École Normale Supérieure has stopped having Elsevier publish the journal Annales Scientifiques de l'École Normale Supérieure (as of 2008).

Effective on 1 January 2020, the French Academy of Sciences stopped publishing its seven journals Comptes rendus de l'Académie des Sciences with Elsevier and switched to Centre Mersenne in Grenoble, France.

=== Germany ===
Since 2018 and as of 2023, almost no academic institution in Germany is subscribed to Elsevier. Germany's DEAL project (Projekt DEAL), which includes over 60 major research institutions, has announced that all of its members are cancelling their contracts with Elsevier, effective 1 January 2017. The boycott is in response to Elsevier's refusal to adopt "transparent business models" to "make publications more openly accessible". Horst Hippler, spokesperson for the DEAL consortium states that "taxpayers have a right to read what they are paying for" and that "publishers must understand that the route to open-access publishing at an affordable price is irreversible". In July 2017, another 13 institutions announced that they would also be cancelling their subscriptions to Elsevier journals. In August 2017, at least 185 German institutions had cancelled their contracts with Elsevier. In 2018, whilst negotiations were ongoing, around 200 German universities that cancelled their subscriptions to Elsevier journals were granted complimentary open access to them until this ended in July of the year.

On 19 December 2018, the Max Planck Society (MPS) in Munich, Germany announced that the existing subscription agreement with Elsevier would not be renewed after the expiration date of 31 December 2018. MPS has 14,000 scientists in 84 research institutes, publishing 12,000 articles each year.

In 2023, Elsevier and DEAL reached a tentative agreement on a publish and read model, which would take effect until 2028 if at least 70% of the eligible institutions opt into it.

=== Hungary ===
In March 2018, the Hungarian Electronic Information Service National Programme entered negotiations on its 2019 Elsevier subscriptions, asking for a read-and-publish deal. Negotiations were ended by the Hungarian consortium in December 2018, and the subscription was not renewed.

=== Iran ===
In 2013, Elsevier changed its policies in response to sanctions announced by the US Office of Foreign Assets Control that year. Included was a request that all Elsevier journals avoid publishing papers by Iranian nationals who are employed by the Iranian government. Elsevier executive Mark Seeley expressed regret on behalf of the company, but did not announce an intention to challenge this interpretation of the law.

=== Italy ===
CRUI (an association of Italian universities) agreed to a 5-year-long deal for 2018–2022, despite protests from the scientific community, protests focused on aspects such as the lack of prevention of cost increases by means of the double dipping.

=== Netherlands ===
In 2015, a consortium of all of Netherlands' 14 universities threatened to boycott Elsevier if it could not agree that articles by Dutch authors would be made open access and settled with the compromise of 30% of its Dutch papers becoming open access by 2018. Gerard Meijer, president of Radboud University in Nijmegen and lead negotiator on the Dutch side noted, "it's not the 100% that I hoped for".

=== Norway ===
In March 2019, the Norwegian government on behalf of 44 institutions—universities, university colleges, research institutes, and hospitals—decided to break negotiations on renewal of their subscription deal with Elsevier, because of disagreement regarding open-access policy and Elsevier's unwillingness to reduce the cost of reading access.

=== South Korea ===
In 2017, over 70 university libraries confirmed a "contract boycott" movement involving three publishers including Elsevier. As of January 2018, whilst negotiations remain underway, a decision will be made as to whether or not continue the participating libraries will continue the boycott. It was then confirmed that an agreement had been reached.

=== Sweden ===
In May 2018, the Bibsam Consortium, which negotiates license agreements on behalf of all Swedish universities and research institutes, decided not to renew their contract with Elsevier, alleging that the publisher does not meet the demands of transition towards a more open-access model, and referring to the rapidly increasing costs for publishing. Swedish universities will still have access to articles published before 30 June 2018. Astrid Söderbergh Widding, chairman of the Bibsam Consortium, said, "the current system for scholarly communication must change and our only option is to cancel deals when they don't meet our demands for a sustainable transition to open access". Sweden has a goal of open access by 2026. In November 2019 the negotiations concluded, with Sweden paying for reading access to Elsevier journals and open access publishing for all its researchers' articles.

=== Taiwan ===
In Taiwan, more than 75% of universities, including top 11 institutions, have joined a collective boycott against Elsevier. On 7 December 2016, the Taiwanese consortium, CONCERT, which represents more than 140 institutions, announced it would not renew its contract with Elsevier.

=== United States ===
In March 2018, the faculty of Florida State University in Tallahassee faculty elected to cancel its $2 million subscription to a bundle of several journals. In 2019, it began buying access to titles à la carte.

In February 2019, the University of California said it would terminate subscriptions "in [a] push for open access to publicly funded research". After months of negotiations over open access to research by UC researchers and prices for subscriptions to Elsevier journals, a press release by the UC Office of the President issued Thursday, 28 February 2019 stated "Under Elsevier's proposed terms, the publisher would have charged UC authors large publishing fees on top of the university's multimillion dollar subscription, resulting in much greater cost to the university and much higher profits for Elsevier." On 10 July 2019, Elsevier began restricting access to all new paywalled articles and approximately 5% of paywalled articles published before 2019.

In April 2020, the University of North Carolina elected not to renew its bundled Elsevier package, citing a failure "to provide an affordable path". Rather than extend the license, which was stated to cost $2.6 million annually, the university decided to continue subscribing to a smaller set of individual journals. The State University of New York Libraries Consortium also announced similar outcome, with the help of estimates from Unpaywall Journals. Similarly, MIT in Cambridge, Massachusetts announced in June 2020 that it would no longer pay for access to new Elsevier articles.

In 2022, Elsevier and the University of Michigan in Ann Arbor established an agreement to support authors who wish to publish open access.

=== Ukraine ===
In June 2020, the Ukrainian government cancelled subscriptions for all universities in the country after failed negotiations. The Ministry of Education claimed that Elsevier indexes journals in its register that call themselves Russian but are from "occupied territories".

== Restrictive access practices ==
=== Lobbying efforts against open access ===
Elsevier have been known to be involved in lobbying against open access. These have included:

- The Federal Research Public Access Act (FRPAA)
- The Research Works Act
- PRISM. In the case of PRISM, the Association of American Publishers hired Eric Dezenhall, the so-called "Pit Bull Of Public Relations"
- Horizon 2020
- Office of Science and Technology Policy (OSTP)
- The European Union's Open Science Monitor was criticized after Elsevier were confirmed as a subcontractor
- UK Research and Innovation.

=== Sale of open-access articles ===
In 2014, 2015, 2016, and 2017, Elsevier was found to be selling some articles that should have been open access, but had been put behind a paywall. A related case occurred in 2015, when Elsevier charged for downloading an open-access article from a journal published by John Wiley & Sons. However, whether Elsevier was in violation of the license under which the article was made available on their website was not clear.

=== Action against academics posting their own articles online ===
In 2013, Digimarc, a company representing Elsevier, told the University of Calgary in Calgary, Alberta to remove articles published by faculty authors on university web pages; although such self-archiving of academic articles may be legal under the fair dealing provisions in Canadian copyright law, the university complied. Harvard University in Cambridge, Massachusetts and the University of California, Irvine also received takedown notices for self-archived academic articles, a first for Harvard, according to Peter Suber.

Months after its acquisition of Academia.edu rival Mendeley, Elsevier sent thousands of takedown notices to Academia.edu, a practice which has since ceased after widespread complaints by academics, according to Academia.edu founder and chief executive Richard Price.

After Elsevier acquired the repository SSRN in May 2016, academics started complaining that some of their work had been removed without notice. The action was explained as a technical error.

=== Lawsuits against paper-sharing sites ===
In 2015, Elsevier filed a lawsuit against the sites Sci-Hub and LibGen, which make copyright-protected articles available for free. Elsevier also claimed illegal access to institutional accounts.

After a case was brought forward in 2017 by the Coalition for Responsible Sharing, a group of publishers which includes Elsevier and the American Chemical Society, the chamber of the Munich Regional Court ruled that the research networking site ResearchGate has to take down articles uploaded without consent from their original publishers, including Elsevier.

=== Resignation of editorial boards ===
The editorial boards of a number of journals have resigned because of disputes with Elsevier over pricing:

- In 1999, the entire editorial board of the Journal of Logic Programming resigned after 16 months of unsuccessful negotiations with Elsevier about the price of library subscriptions. The personnel created a new journal, Theory and Practice of Logic Programming, with Cambridge University Press in Cambridge, England at a much lower price, while Elsevier continued publication with a new editorial board and a slightly different name (the Journal of Logic and Algebraic Programming).
- In 2002, dissatisfaction at Elsevier's pricing policies caused the European Economic Association to terminate an agreement with Elsevier designating Elsevier's European Economic Review as the official journal of the association. The EEA launched a new journal, the Journal of the European Economic Association.
- In 2003, the entire editorial board of the Journal of Algorithms resigned to start ACM Transactions on Algorithms with a different, lower-priced, not-for-profit publisher, at the suggestion of Journal of Algorithms founder Donald Knuth. The Journal of Algorithms continued under Elsevier with a new editorial board until October 2009, when it was discontinued.
- In 2005, the editors of the International Journal of Solids and Structures resigned to start the Journal of Mechanics of Materials and Structures. However, a new editorial board was quickly established and the journal continues in apparently unaltered form.
- In 2006, the entire editorial board of the distinguished mathematical journal Topology resigned because of stalled negotiations with Elsevier to lower the subscription price. This board then launched the new Journal of Topology at a far lower price, under the auspices of the London Mathematical Society. Topology then remained in circulation under a new editorial board until 2009.
- In 2023, the editorial board of the open access journal NeuroImage resigned and started a new journal because of Elsevier's unwillingness to reduce article-processing charges. The editors called Elsevier's $3,450 per article processing charge "unethical and unsustainable".

Editorial boards have also resigned over open access policies or other issues:

- In 2015, Stephen Leeder was removed from his role as editor of the Medical Journal of Australia when its publisher decided to outsource the journal's production to Elsevier. As a consequence, all but one of the journal's editorial advisory committee members co-signed a letter of resignation.
- In 2015, the entire editorial staff of the general linguistics journal Lingua resigned in protest of Elsevier's unwillingness to agree to their terms of Fair Open Access. Editor-in-chief Johan Rooryck also announced that the Lingua staff would establish a new journal, Glossa.
- In 2019, the entire editorial board of Elsevier's Journal of Informetrics resigned over the open-access policies of its publisher and founded open-access journal called Quantitative Science Studies. The resignation came in the context of Elsevier along among the major publishers declining to join the Initiative for Open Citations. Elsevier finally joined the initiative in January 2021 after the data was already available with an Open Data Commons license in Microsoft Academic.
- In 2020, Elsevier effectively severed the tie between the Journal of Asian Economics and the academic society that founded it, the American Committee on Asian Economic Studies (ACAES), by offering the ACAES-appointed editor, Calla Wiemer, a terminal contract for 2020. As a result, a majority of the editorial board eventually resigned.
- In 2023, the editorial board of the journal Design Studies resigned over Elsevier's 1) plans to increase publications seven-fold; 2) the appointment of an external Editor-in-Chief who had not previously published in the journal; and 3) changing the scope of the journal without consulting the editorial team or the journal's parent society.
- In December 2024, the editorial board of Journal of Human Evolution, including emeritus editors and all but one associate editor, resigned, citing actions by Elsevier that they said "are fundamentally incompatible with the ethos of the journal and preclude maintaining the quality and integrity fundamental to JHE's success". In addition to pricing, specific complaints also included interference in the editorial board, lack of necessary support from the company, and the disruptive use of generative AI by the company to alter submissions without informing editors or contributors.
- In April 2026, 45 of the 48 members of the editorial board of Journal of Approximation Theory resigned over "concerning and potentially detrimental" made by Elsevier. The editor-in-chief Paul Nevai claimed that Elsevier had "increased oversight, employed heavy-handed involvement in editorial decisions and attempted to speed up the article production process."
- In August 2026, six editors and 58 advisory editors of Games and Economic Behavior resigned after Elsevier refused to renew the editor-in-chief's contract.

=== "The Cost of Knowledge" boycott ===
In 2003, various university librarians began coordinating with each other to complain about Elsevier's "big deal" journal bundling packages, in which the company offered a group of journal subscriptions to libraries at a certain rate, but in which librarians claimed no economical option was available to subscribe to only the popular journals at a rate comparable to the bundled rate. Librarians continued to discuss the implications of the pricing schemes, many feeling pressured into buying the Elsevier packages without other options.

On 21 January 2012, mathematician Timothy Gowers publicly announced that he would boycott Elsevier, noting that others in the field have been doing so privately. The reasons for the boycott are high subscription prices for individual journals, bundling subscriptions to journals of different value and importance, and Elsevier's support for SOPA, PIPA, and the Research Works Act, which would have prohibited open-access mandates for U.S. federally-funded research and severely restricted the sharing of scientific data.

Afterwards a petition advocating noncooperation with Elsevier (that is, not submitting papers to Elsevier journals, not refereeing articles in Elsevier journals, and not participating in journal editorial boards), appeared on the site "The Cost of Knowledge". By February 2012, this petition had been signed by over 5,000 academics, growing to over 17,000 by November 2018. The firm disputed the claims, claiming that their prices are below the industry average, and stating that bundling is only one of several different options available to buy access to Elsevier journals. The company also claimed that its profit margins are "simply a consequence of the firm's efficient operation". The academics replied that their work was funded by public money, thus should be freely available.

On 27 February 2012, Elsevier issued a statement on its website that declared that it had withdrawn support from the Research Works Act. Although the Cost of Knowledge movement was not mentioned, the statement indicated the hope that the move would "help create a less heated and more productive climate" for ongoing discussions with research funders. Hours after Elsevier's statement, the sponsors of the bill, U.S. Representatives Darrell Issa and Carolyn Maloney, issued a joint statement saying that they would not push the bill in Congress.

=== Plan S open-access initiative ===
About a Europe-based initiative called Plan S aimed at requiring researchers to publish in open-access journals, a spokesman for Elsevier said "If you think that information should be free of charge, go to Wikipedia". In September 2018, UBS advised to sell Elsevier (RELX) stocks, noting that Plan S could affect 5-10% of scientific funding and may force Elsevier to reduce pricing.

== See also ==
- List of Elsevier periodicals
- 2collab, a free researcher collaboration tool launched by Elsevier in 2007 and discontinued in 2011
- Sci-Hub, a website providing free access to otherwise paywalled academic papers that is involved in a legal case with Elsevier
- Bertelsmann
- Holtzbrinck Publishing Group
- Lagardère Publishing
- McGraw Hill Education
- News Corp
- Pearson plc
- Scholastic Corporation
- Thomson Reuters
- Wiley (publisher)
