= 2010 conservatism-psychoticism correlation error =

Academic controversy

In psychologist Hans Eysenck's P–E–N (psychoticism, extraversion and neuroticism) model of personality, psychoticism is a trait which is typified by aggressiveness and interpersonal hostility. In 2010, a paper titled "The nature of the relationship between personality traits and political attitudes" claimed to find a strong positive correlation between conservatism and psychoticism. This error was repeated in subsequent papers by the same authors; however, around 2015, the authors acknowledged the correlation is actually negative rather than positive, and began issuing corrections.

== Background ==
Many studies have found significant correlations between personality traits and political attitudes. For example, conscientiousness appears to correlate with conservatism, and openness correlates with a liberal ideology. Some scholars have used these correlations to argue that differences in personality traits are a strong causal factor in determining what political attitudes people align themselves with; others have argued this is the wrong causal analysis. In this latter view, the correlation instead arises due to a third factor which causes both the statistical differences in personality traits and the statistical differences in political attitudes.

== 2010 paper ==
In 2010, Brad Verhulst, Peter K. Hatemi, and Nicholas G. Martin published a paper in Personality and Individual Differences arguing for the "third factor" explanation. In the course of their analysis, they calculated various correlations between various personality traits and various political attitudes. Among these published calculations was a correlation of +0.5 between psychoticism and conservative religious attitudes and a correlation of +0.6 between psychoticism and conservative sexual attitudes. However, these two calculations, among others, were erroneous; the actual calculated correlations should have been negative. While the actual sign of the correlation was irrelevant to the 2010 paper's primary thesis (which was about the similarity of the scores of pairs of identical twins, rather than scores being high vs low), the error created difficulties for subsequent scientists exploring other facets of the correlation, for whom the direction of the correlation was relevant.

== Subsequent events ==
Verhulst and Hatemi made the same mistake in a 2012 American Journal of Political Science (AJPS) publication that used a different set of data. By one count, this 2012 paper would later be cited 45 times.

In 2012, Steven G. Ludeke, a Ph.D. psychology student, spotted that the direction of the claimed correlation in the 2010 and 2012 papers contradicted both prior research and common sense; a positive correlation would mean that compared to liberals, conservatives are more drug-friendly, care less about cleanliness, and disdain society's strictures. Ludeke correctly hypothesized that the sign of the correlation was reversed. Ludeke's thesis advisor, Colin DeYoung, had met Hatemi before; DeYoung initiated correspondence with Hatemi on July 27, 2012, to report the error and to request access to the datasets. Hatemi disputed that an error occurred but initially seemed receptive to sharing the data. However, despite repeated attempts in 2012 and 2013, Ludeke and DeYoung were unable to gain access to the data of the 2010 and 2012 papers. In 2013, Hatemi and Verhulst submitted a paper to AJPS that contained the same mistaken sign-reversed correlation. Ludeke was one of the anonymous reviewers; Ludeke reiterated his criticism that the sign of the correlation was flipped. The paper was rejected by AJPS; however, in 2015, Hatemi and Verhulst published the paper in PLOS One, an open-data journal.

Around 2015, Ludeke and DeYoung submitted a paper for publication to the Journal of Personality and Social Psychology (JPSP) debunking Hatemi and Verhulst's claim; Hatemi was chosen as a reviewer. According to Ludeke and DeYoung, this triggered Hatemi and Verhulst to "race" to submit corrections to all the journals that published the error. The JPSP and other journals then rejected the Ludeke and DeYoung paper, possibly in part because the corrections had already been issued.

Following the corrections, some right-wing media outlets embraced the finding that liberalism correlates with psychoticism; the New York Post wrote that "Science says liberals, not conservatives, are psychotic". However, as New York Magazine pointed out, "psychoticism, in this case, doesn’t mean psychotic in the everyday sense of the word."

In 2016, Ludeke and DeYoung published a less critical version of their paper in Personality and Individual Differences. Hatemi and Verhulst published a response, titled "Correcting Honest Errors Versus Incorrectly Portraying Them: Responding to Ludeke and Rasmussen", in the same journal. "Correcting" stated that "longstanding published literature... already identified a positive correlation between conservatism and Psychoticism"; however, three of the four non-book citations given by "Correcting" to support this claim explicitly reported a negative correlation.

Hatemi and Verhulst ascribed the error to the specific codebook used for the project, which inverted the codes for statements that counted towards psychoticism and the statements that counted against psychoticism in the surveys. Verhulst stated he didn't know whether the error originated from the authors or from the group that conducted the surveys, saying "I don’t know where it happened, all I know is it happened. It’s our fault for not figuring it out before."
