= MLQ =

MLQ may refer to:

== Publications ==
- Mathematical Logic Quarterly, a logic journal
- Modern Language Quarterly, a quarterly journal of literary history
- Mon Lapin quotidien, a French comic anthology series published by L'Association

== Codes ==
- ISO 639:mlq, language code for the Kassonke language in Mali and Senegal
- MLQ, the IATA code for Malalaua airport in Papua New Guinea
- MLQ, the station code for Malkera Junction railway station in Dhanbad, Jharkhand, India
- MLQ, the wireless call sign used for the Canadian cargo ship SS Mount Temple

== Other uses ==
- Major League Quidditch, a quidditch league based in the United States and Canada
- Manuel L. Quezon (1878–1944), Filipino president, known by his initials
- Mouvement de libération du Québec, a 1960s organization associated with the Front de libération du Québec
- Mouvement laïque québécois, a Canadian non-profit organization
- Multifactor Leadership Questionnaire, a psychological inventory

== See also ==
- Manuel L. Quezon University (MLQU), a private university in the Philippines
