= 2collab =

- Founded: November 2007
- Dissolved: April 15, 2011
- Creator: Elsevier
- Website: www.2collab.com
- Current status: Defunct

2collab was a scientific social network launched by Elsevier in November 2007 and discontinued on 15 April 2011.

== Overview ==
2collab was an online collaborative research tool that enabled researchers to share bookmarks, references or any linked materials with their peers and colleagues. Users could share, collaborate and discuss resources either in private groups or openly with the wider scientific community. Through the integration of 2collab into other scientific platforms such as ScienceDirect and Scopus researchers were enabled to transport not only the bookmark but also the bibliographic data of research papers into their accounts. Especially when they were the author of these bookmarked documents they could create an easy-to-use list and share it with others in their field of expertise and start a conversation.

Users could organize the wide breadth of information online by choosing tags that turn the vast amount of information into navigational structure that is called a folksonomy also known as user generated content.

2collab shut down its service on April 15, 2011.

== See also ==
- SSRN
- Mendeley
- Comparison of reference management software
