= Donald Templer =

American psychologist

Donald I. Templer was a retired American psychologist best known for ideas on race and intelligence, and his association with the white nationalist group American Renaissance. He was formerly a professor of psychology at Alliant International University in Fresno, California.

== Education and career ==
Templer received his Ph.D. from the University of Kentucky in 1967. He was a professor of psychology at Alliant International University in Fresno, California.

== Research ==
=== Death Anxiety Scale ===
Templer developed the Death Anxiety Scale, the best-known scale used to measure death anxiety, in 1970.

=== Race and intelligence ===
Templer's most recent studies focused on race and intelligence and he spoke on the subject at white nationalist American Renaissance conferences. Templer and Hiroko Arikawa argued in a 2006 study that colder climates favor higher IQs because it is more difficult to live in such areas. Templer described "race realists" as modern-day Galileos, and argued that the compensated sterilization of welfare recipients would be cost saving, and prevent "burdens" on society.

==== Retraction of 2012 article ====
On 17 June 2020, publisher Elsevier announced it was retracting an article that Templer and J. Philippe Rushton had published in 2012 in the Elsevier journal Personality and Individual Differences. The article claimed that there was scientific evidence that skin color was related to aggression and sexuality in humans.

=== Penis size ===
In 2002, he published the book Is Size Important?, which focuses on variations in human penis size and preferences for penises of certain sizes. He appeared on the Howard Stern Show to discuss this subject in 2007, where Stern referred to him as "Dr. Penis".
