= Personality and Individual Differences =

- Discipline: Personality psychology
- Language: English
- Edited by: Peter K. Jonason, Julie Aitken Schermer, Aljoscha Neubauer, Michelle Yik and Colin Cooper

Publication details
- History: Since 1980
- Publisher: Elsevier
- Frequency: 16/year
- Impact factor: 2.6 (2024)

Standard abbreviations
- ISO 4: Pers. Individ. Differ.
- NLM: Pers Individ Dif

Indexing
- CODEN: PEIDD9
- ISSN: 0191-8869
- LCCN: 85647765
- OCLC no.: 04965018

Links
- Journal homepage; Online access

Personality and Individual Differences is a peer-reviewed academic journal published 16 times per year by Elsevier. It was established in 1980 by Pergamon Press and is the official journal of the International Society for the Study of Individual Differences. The editors-in-chief are Peter K. Jonason, Julie Aitken Schermer, Aljoscha Neubauer, Michelle Yik and Colin Cooper. Previous editors include Donald H. Saklofske, Philip A. Vernon, Gísli Guðjónsson and Sybil B. G. Eysenck. The founding editor was Hans Jürgen Eysenck. The journal covers research about the structure of personality and other forms of individual differences, the processes which cause these individual differences to emerge, and their practical applications.

== Abstracting and indexing ==
The journal is abstracted and indexed in:

- Current Contents/Social & Behavioral Sciences
- PASCAL
- PsycINFO
- Scopus
- Social Sciences Citation Index

According to the Journal Citation Reports, the journal has a 2024 impact factor of 2.6.

== Retractions ==
On 17 June 2020 Elsevier announced it was retracting a 2012 article by J. Philippe Rushton and Donald Templer. The article falsely claimed that there was scientific evidence that skin color was related to aggression and sexuality in humans.

== See also ==
- 2010 conservatism-psychoticism correlation error
