= Medicine Publishing =

UK publisher

Medical Publishing
- Parent company: Elsevier
- Status: Active
- Founded: 1972
- Founder: Simon Campbell-Smith
- Country of origin: United Kingdom
- Headquarters location: Oxford
- Distribution: Worldwide
- Publication types: Medical journals
- Nonfiction topics: Medicine
- Official website: www.medicinepublishing.co.uk

Medicine Publishing was an academic publishing company established in 1972. Since 2005, it is an imprint of Elsevier.

== History ==
The company was founded with the establishment of its first journal, Medicine, by Simon Campbell-Smith in 1972. In 2000, Campbell-Smith and his shareholding managing director, Christian Benzing, sold Medicine and three sister titles to an international group, Vivendi Universal (Health). Two years later, the health division of Vivendi was sold to a consortium of venture capitalists and renamed MediMedia, which was in turn acquired by Elsevier in 2005 and the journals were brought in-house as an imprint within the Health Sciences division of Elsevier.
