= Wlodek Rabinowicz =

Polish-Swedish philosopher (born 1947)

- Born: 14 January 1947 (age 79); Warsaw, Poland

Philosophical work
- Era: 21st-century philosophy
- Region: Western philosophy
- School: Analytic Philosophy
- Main interests: Normativity, practical philosophy, decision theory, ethics, epistemology

Wlodek Rabinowicz (Włodzimierz Rabinowicz, born on 14 January 1947) is a Polish-Swedish philosopher and Professor Emeritus at Lund University. Rabinowicz's areas of expertise include ethics, normativity, decision theory and utilitarianism. From 1995 to 1998, he was editor-in-chief of Theoria.

== Biography ==
He began his undergraduate studies at the University of Warsaw, but after the 1968 Polish political crisis he moved to the University of Uppsala, where he graduated in 1970. He received his doctorate in 1979.

Rabinowicz is a former director (1994–1995) of the Swedish Collegium for Advanced Study in Uppsala, Sweden, as well as a multiple Residential Fellow at the same institute (Spring 1994, Spring 2004, Fall 2008, September 2009, Fall 2011, Fall 2014). He was appointed Professor of practical philosophy at Lund University in 1995. ).

== Bibliography ==
- Universalizability. A study in morals and metaphysics, D.Reidel Publ. Comp., Dordrecht 1979.
- Logic for a Change, Festschrift for Sten Lindström, redakcja, wraz z Svenem Ove Hanssonem, Uppsala Prints and Preprints in Philosophy 1995.
- Preference and Value - Preferentialism in Ethics, redakcja, Studies in Philosophy, Lund 1996.
- Value and Choice – Some Common Themes in Decision Theory and Moral Philosophy, redaktor, Lund Philosophy Reports 2000:1
- Value and Choice – Some Common Themes in Decision Theory and Moral Philosophy, vol. 2, redaktor, Lund Philosophy Reports 2001:1.
- Patterns of Value – Essays on Formal Axiology and Value Analysis, vol. 2, redaktor, wraz z Toni Rønnow-Rasmussenem, Lund Philosophy Reports 2004:1,
