= De Grote Donorshow =

Hoax reality television program

- The Great Donor Show logo (note the "o"'s substitution by the logo of the Dutch Kidney Foundation)
- Also known as: The Great Donor Show
- Genre: Reality television
- Created by: Endemol
- Presented by: Patrick Lodiers
- Country of origin: Netherlands
- Original language: Dutch

Production
- Producer: Endemol
- Production location: Aalsmeer

Original release
- Network: Nederland 3 (via BNN)

A screenshot of the television show. Patrick Lodiers, the host of the show (right), has just announced that no kidney donation is going to take place, and that the show was a hoax. The photo to the right of the screen is of BNN founder Bart de Graaff.

De Grote Donorshow (The Great Donor Show or The Big Donor Show) is a reality television program which was broadcast in the Netherlands on Friday, June 1, 2007, by BNN. The program involved a supposedly terminally ill 37-year-old woman donating a kidney to one of twenty-five people requiring a kidney transplantation. After a first selection, three people remained. Viewers were able to send advice on whom they thought she should choose to give her kidney to via text messages. The profit made by the text messages was given to the Dutch Kidney Foundation. The program, due to its controversial nature, had received heavy criticism from international media in the run-up to the broadcast. In the end, it was revealed during the course of the show that the "terminally ill" woman was, in reality, an actress, although the three candidates were, in fact, real kidney patients. They were aware that Lisa was an actress, and participated because they were supportive of BNN's cause to raise awareness of low organ donor rates in the Netherlands.

In a press statement after the show aired, Paul Römer, the director of the program's creator Endemol, stated that the show was necessary in order to get the organ donor shortage back on the political agenda.

== Background ==
Bart de Graaff, the BNN founder, had lifelong kidney issues after a car accident in his youth, which stunted his growth and required many operations. His work in television often focused on satire and crude humour. He obtained a donor kidney in 1997, and died in May 2002 from complications due to renal failure.

The studio from which the show was aired contained photos of him, as seen in the adjacent picture. De Graaff was an inspiration for the show, and some of the production work for the show was disguised as a show memorializing him.

== Criticism and reactions ==
=== Prior to the airing of the show ===
Joop Atsma, a member of the House of Representatives for the Christian Democratic Appeal, had attempted to censor the show. Dutch culture minister Ronald Plasterk, citing Dutch law, refused to prohibit the television program, although he found the program to be unethical due to its competitive element. Before the show aired, the Dutch Kidney Foundation told a reporter "they welcomed all the attention the show had brought on the subject" but also stated that "their way of doing it is not ours, and it will bring no practical solution". In a press statement, the foundation also stated that they had asked BNN to cease using their logo in The Great Donor Show's logo (note the icon of a kidney instead of an "o" in the logo, as seen at the top right of the page), for which BNN had never asked permission. The Dutch prime minister, Jan Peter Balkenende, had expressed his concerns for what he believed would damage the reputation of the Netherlands.

Laurens Drillich, the chairman of BNN at the time, defended the program and argued that the network deliberately wants to shock people and draw attention to the shortage of organ donors. "We very much agree that it's bad taste but we also believe that reality is even worse taste. I mean, it's going very, very bad with organ donorship in the Netherlands. We as a broadcaster, BNN, had someone who started our TV station who needed kidneys and was on a waiting list and died eventually at the age of 35. That happened five years ago and in the last five years the situation has only gotten worse in the Netherlands."

The international community condemned the broadcast. A co-chair of the UK National Kidney Foundation said the show was only operating on shock value, and that Endemol had not considered the ramifications of competing for a kidney on live TV.

=== After the airing of the show ===
In a press statement after the show, the director of Endemol, Paul Römer, stated "Let there be no misunderstanding, I would never make a program such as 'The Great Donor Show' for real. I do understand the massive outrage very well. But I also hope for people to understand why we did this. It was necessary to get the shortage of donors back on the political agenda. I call up everybody to get very angry about that, and to fill in a donor form."

Minister of Education, Culture, and Science Ronald Plasterk told the press he now thought that "the show had been a fantastic idea, and a great stunt". Joop Atsma, MP for the Christian Democrats, who had previously attempted to prohibit the show, has called it a "tasteless show", and claimed that he feels it didn't contribute to the solving of the problem.

A few hours after the show BNN had already received SMS messages from over 12,000 viewers who told the network that they would fill in a donor form. The day after, 30,000 donor forms were requested, and two days after the show the official Dutch TV news broadcast "NOS News" announced that 50,000 people had requested a donor form to be sent to them. In July, a month after the show aired, 7,300 new donors were registered by the Dutch donor registration.

In 2020, thirteen years later, all three participants in the show, Vincent Moolenaar, Charlotte Trieschnigg, and Esther-Clair Sasabone, were still alive.

==== Dutch TV moment of the year 2007 ====
On January 12, 2008, the scene during which Patrick Lodiers revealed that the show was a hoax with the purpose of drawing attention to the Dutch donor shortage problem was voted as the best Dutch TV moment of the year 2007. During a brief speech, the chairman of BNN, Laurens Drillich, said the following: "The show was aired in June, today is January. Dutch politicians promised to put donor shortage on their agenda. We're still waiting for a reaction."

==== Awards ====
The show won a 2008 International Emmy for non-scripted entertainment.
