= Aristide Saggino =

Italian psychologist and psychometrician

- Born: 1956 (age 69–70); Naples, Italy
- Education: Sapienza University of Rome; Pontifical Salesian University
- Known for: Advocacy of evidence-based psychotherapy; Teate Depression Inventory
- Scientific career
- Fields: Psychometrics, individual differences, cognitive behavioral therapy
- Workplaces: University of Chieti–Pescara

Aristide Saggino (born 1956) is an Italian psychologist and psychotherapist, and former full professor of psychometrics at the University of Chieti–Pescara. He is co-author of the Teate Depression Inventory and served two terms as national president of the Italian Association for Behaviour Analysis and Modification and Behavioural and Cognitive Therapy (AIAMC). He is known for his advocacy of scientifically grounded, evidence-based psychotherapy.

== Education and career ==
Saggino graduated in psychology from Sapienza University of Rome in 1979 and completed a specialization in clinical psychology there in 1992. He received a PhD in psychology from the Pontifical Salesian University in 2000, with a dissertation on the Myers–Briggs Type Indicator.

From 1979 to 2001 he worked as a psychologist in the Italian national health service in Campania, while conducting research on psychological testing at Sapienza University from 1985 to 1999. In 1994, supported by a NATO Senior Fellowship, he was a research fellow at the University of Exeter with psychometrician Paul Kline, with whom he co-authored studies of the Italian Myers–Briggs Type Indicator. Between 1998 and 2007 he was repeatedly a visiting professor at the Institute of Psychiatry, King's College London, working on personality theory and assessment.

He joined the University of Chieti–Pescara as associate professor in 2001 and was full professor from 2006 until his retirement in 2026. Since October 2026 he has been scientific director of the postgraduate schools of cognitive behavioural psychotherapy of the Centro per lo Studio della Personalità (CSP), which are recognised by the AIAMC. He chaired the undergraduate programme in psychological sciences from 2005 to 2012 and headed the university's Psychometrics Laboratory and its laboratory for research on cognitive behavioural and evidence-based psychotherapy (LARIPSI).

He was national president of the AIAMC from 2014 to 2017 and again from 2020 to 2024. During his first term, in March 2016, the AIAMC became the first Italian association to have its training programmes accredited by the European Association for Behavioural and Cognitive Therapies (EABCT). From 2017 to 2023 he was the AIAMC's representative to the EABCT. Since 2019 he has been vice-president of IACABAI, the Italy Associate Chapter of the Association for Behavior Analysis International formed by AIAMC and AARBA. From 2012 to 2020 he chaired the Abruzzo–Molise section of CICAP, the Italian skeptics' organization.

== Research ==
Saggino's research covers the construction and validation of psychological tests, individual differences with a focus on psychometric theories of intelligence, and cognitive behavioural therapy.

With Michela Balsamo he developed the Teate Depression Inventory (TDI), a self-report measure of depression built using the Rasch model. In the United States, the construct validity of the TDI has been the subject of graduate theses at Eastern Illinois University, including studies with Black/African American and Middle Eastern/Arab American samples.

He has also led Italian adaptations of several instruments, including the Myers–Briggs Type Indicator, the Eysenck Personality Profiler and the WPPSI-IV.

Since 2022 he has served on the scientific advisory board of the Treatments That Work series of Oxford University Press, edited by David H. Barlow.

He has also been active in public outreach on evidence-based psychotherapy; in 2015, for example, he spoke at Expo 2015 in Milan in a round table titled "Towards an evidence-based psychotherapy". On 26 October 2023 he testified as an expert before the 10th Standing Committee of the Italian Senate during its examination of bills on the employment of people with autism spectrum disorders.

He has also expressed critical views on the scientific status of contemporary cognitive behavioural therapy: at the 2022 CBT-Italia congress in Florence, speaking as president of the AIAMC, he described the field's crisis as "pathological" rather than healthy, a view discussed critically by Giovanni Maria Ruggiero.

== Awards ==
In 2024 he received the "Buona Sanità" (Good Healthcare) award, presented in Naples by the Buona Sanità association, for his contribution to research on and public dissemination of evidence-based psychotherapies.

== Selected works ==
- Saggino, A., & Kline, P. (1996). "The location of the Myers-Briggs Type Indicator in personality factor space". Personality and Individual Differences, 21, 591–597.
- Saggino, A. (2000). "The Big Three or the Big Five? A replication study". Personality and Individual Differences, 28, 879–886.
- Saggino, A. (2002). La teoria dei tipi psicologici. Una verifica empirica. Bari: Laterza.
- Ebisch, S. J., et al., & Saggino, A. (2012). "Common and unique neuro-functional basis of induction, visualization, and spatial relationships as cognitive components of fluid intelligence". NeuroImage, 62, 331–342.
- Balsamo, M., & Saggino, A. (2013). TDI – Teate Depression Inventory. Manuale. Florence: Hogrefe.
- Balsamo, M., Giampaglia, G., & Saggino, A. (2014). "Building a new Rasch-based self-report inventory of depression". Neuropsychiatric Disease and Treatment, 10, 153–165.
- Saggino, A., Pezzuti, L., Tommasi, M., Cianci, L., Colom, R., & Orsini, A. (2014). "Null sex differences in general intelligence among elderly". Personality and Individual Differences, 63, 53–57.
- Saggino, A., & Collevecchio, A. (2014). Psicoterapia e metodo scientifico. Un'analisi critica. Milan: FrancoAngeli.
- Tommasi, M., Pezzuti, L., Colom, R., Abad, F. J., Saggino, A., & Orsini, A. (2015). "Increased education level is related with higher IQ scores but lower g-variance: Evidence from the standardization of the WAIS-R for Italy". Intelligence, 50, 68–74.
- Carlucci, L., Saggino, A., & Balsamo, M. (2021). "On the efficacy of the unified protocol for transdiagnostic treatment of emotional disorders: A systematic review and meta-analysis". Clinical Psychology Review, 87, 101999.
