= Medicine (Elsevier journal) =

- Discipline: Internal medicine
- Language: English
- Edited by: Allister Vale, John Mucklow

Publication details
- History: 1972-present
- Publisher: Medicine Publishing
- Frequency: Monthly

Standard abbreviations
- ISO 4: Medicine (Abingdon)

Indexing
- ISSN: 1357-3039
- OCLC no.: 60618547

Links
- Journal homepage; Online archive; Journal page at publisher's website

Medicine is a continually updated, evidence-based medical review journal covering internal medicine and its specialties. It was established by Simon Campbell-Smith in 1972 and is published by Medicine Publishing. The editor-in-chief is Allister Vale (City Hospital, Birmingham).

== Scope ==
The journal aims to cover the fundamentals of internal medicine in a systematic way during a recurring four-year cycle – it can be seen as a general medicine textbook that is published "a chapter at a time". It covers the topics at a level appropriate to the non-specialist, providing clinicians with up-to-date, understandable clinical information. It is aimed specifically at trainees in internal medicine and its specialties who are preparing for postgraduate examinations. The journal is abstracted and indexed by Scopus and Embase.

== Editors-in-chief ==
The following persons have been editor-in-chief ("chairman of the board") of the journal:

- Sir John McMichael FRS (1972–1978)
- Sir John Badenoch (1979–1996)
- Alasdair Geddes (1996–2002)
- Allister Vale (2003–present)
