= Journal of Psychoeducational Assessment =

- Discipline: Educational psychology
- Language: English
- Edited by: Donald H. Saklofske

Publication details
- History: 1982-present
- Publisher: SAGE Publications
- Frequency: 8/year
- Impact factor: 1.424 (2017)

Standard abbreviations
- ISO 4: J. Psychoeduc. Assess.

Indexing
- ISSN: 0734-2829 (print); 1557-5144 (web)
- LCCN: 83645344
- OCLC no.: 8722578

Links
- Journal homepage; Online access; Online archive

The Journal of Psychoeducational Assessment is a peer-reviewed academic journal that publishes papers in the field of educational psychology. The journal's editor-in-chief is Donald H. Saklofske (University of Western Ontario). It was established in 1983 and is currently published by SAGE Publications. This journal is a member of the Committee on Publication Ethics (COPE).

== Abstracting and indexing ==
Journal of Psychoeducational Assessment is abstracted and indexed in Scopus and the Social Sciences Citation Index. According to the Journal Citation Reports, its 2017 impact factor is 1.424, ranking it 30 out of 59 journals in the category "Psychology, Educational".
