= Malcolm MacColl =

Scottish Anglican cleric and publicist (1831–1907)

The Reverend Malcolm MacColl
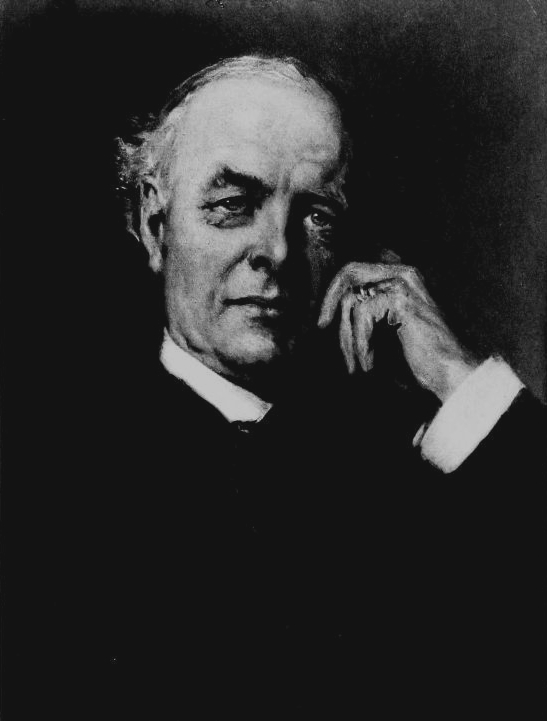
- Portrait of Malcolm MacColl by Hubert von Herkomer
- Born: Malcolm MacColl; 27 March 1831; Glenfinnan, Inverness-shire, Scotland
- Died: 5 April 1907 (aged 76); London, England
- Occupation: Anglican priest
- Known for: Anglo-Catholic activist, advocate for oppressed Christians in the Ottoman Empire, influencer of British foreign policy in the Balkans
- Relatives: Hugh MacColl (brother)

Malcolm MacColl (27 March 1831 – 5 April 1907) was a Scottish Anglican cleric and publicist, noted for his views on Islam and the Eastern Question.

== Early life ==
MacColl was a native Scots Gaelic speaker, the son of a poor crofter or labourer in Glenfinnan. His father died when he was still a boy. Despite difficulties, MacColl succeeded in obtaining an education. He claimed Jacobite descent, and seems early to have adopted high church Anglican views. He won a place at Trinity College, Glenalmond, for the Scottish Episcopal ministry, and was ordained a priest of the Episcopal Church in 1857.

In May 1858 MacColl approached William Ewart Gladstone in a letter warning him about measures against High Church bishops in the Scottish Episcopal Church, also alluding to his own financial circumstances. He tenaciously continued the correspondence, and eventually managed to meet Gladstone. There developed a lifelong friendship and political alliance. Gladstone secured preferment for his protégé, but MacColl never rose high in the Anglican Church. He refused to compromise his Anglo-Catholic theological views. Gladstone's first piece of assistance was to facilitate the young MacColl's transfer from Scotland to London and the Church of England.

MacColl was received as a priest of the Church of England in 1859, and then entered on a succession of curacies, in London and at Addington, Bucks. He also served between 1864 and 1867 as the Chaplain of the British Embassy in St. Petersburg, Russia, and Naples.

== Campaigner ==
Despite limited knowledge of foreign languages, MacColl corresponded with continental Roman Catholic dissidents after the First Vatican Council: Josip Juraj Strossmayer of Diakova, and Ignaz von Döllinger in Munich. He acted as a discreet intermediary between them and Gladstone. Both Strossmayer and Döllinger were interested in the "Eastern Question" and the ending of Turkish rule in the Balkans. This, as well as similar currents of opinion in the Liberal Party, may have been responsible for MacColl's own interest in combatting Turkish political power during the last three decades of his life. From 1876 onwards, MacColl was an active defender of the Christian inhabitants of the Ottoman Empire, writing a series of vitriolic attacks on the Ottoman Empire and its friends in Britain in letters to newspapers, articles in reviews, and publishing several books.

In August 1876, soon after the exposure of the killings of up to 15,000 Bulgarians the previous spring by Circassian irregulars in the Ottoman army, MacColl and Henry Liddon of St Paul's Cathedral travelled to Vienna and Serbia on a fact-finding tour. During a boat ride on the River Sava, then the frontier between Serbia and the Ottoman Empire, the two clergymen claimed to have seen an impaled human corpse. Though their testimony could not be independently confirmed, and was challenged by the local British Consul who suggested that the object in question might have been only a bag of beans, MacColl and Liddon used this sighting as proof of the iniquity of Turkish rule in the Balkans. This fitted in with a theme in their sermons that those in Britain (such as Gladstone's arch-opponent Benjamin Disraeli) who did not actively oppose Turkish rule were themselves guilty of its sins.

In his private correspondent with Gladstone after the Bulgarian atrocities, MacColl urged the Liberal leader to denounce the Ottomans and is perhaps partly responsible for the campaigning speeches Gladstone made on the issue in the last months of 1876 and early 1877. After returning to power Gladstone rewarded MacColl with the London living of St George Botolph Lane, in 1871, and with a canonry of Ripon in 1884. The latter posting aroused the active opposition of Queen Victoria who had not forgotten or forgiven MacColl's virulent campaign against the Ottoman Empire in 1876–78 after the 'Bulgarian Agitation'.

The living at Ripon was practically a sinecure. MacColl maintained a large house at Kirby Overblow, south of Harrogate, and continued to devote himself to political pamphleteering and newspaper correspondence, the result of extensive European travel, a wide acquaintance with the leading personages of the day, strong views on ecclesiastical subjects from a high-church standpoint, and particularly on the politics of the Eastern Question, the uprising in Crete, then still an Ottoman province, the cause of the Armenians and Islam.

== Later life and death ==
MacColl was on close terms with George I of Greece, and leaders of the Armenian movement. During the Greco-Turkish War of April 1897, he visited Athens to confer with the King, conveying the monarch's private views both to Gladstone and also to the Prime Minister Lord Salisbury. In the first years of the twentieth century, he was an opponent of the Muslim spokesmen Syed Ameer Ali and Halil Hâlid. He admonished them, arguing for instance that the Ottoman Sultan was not the Caliph of all Muslims.

MacColl died in London on 5 April 1907. In his will, he left his library to the Gladstone collection at Hawarden.

== Family ==
In 1904 MacColl married Consuelo Albinia Crompton-Stansfield, daughter of Major-General William Henry Crompton-Stansfield (1835–1888) of Esholt Hall.

MacColl had a younger brother, Hugh MacColl, who became known as a logician. He had tried to persuade Gladstone to pay for Hugh to be educated at the University of Oxford; but Hugh had refused to become an Anglican priest as Gladstone insisted.

== Works ==
Most of MacColl's earlier writings centred on the theology. After his arrival in London, he began to publish articles, writing with increasing proficiency. Major works include:

- Lawlessness, Sacerdotalism and Ritualism (1875), an attack on the Judicial Committee of the Privy Council, associated with controversy over the Public Worship Regulation Act 1874.
- The Eastern Question: Its Facts and Fallacies (1877), five editions.
- Three Years of the Eastern Question (1878), which appeared immediately after the Congress of Berlin had ended.

MacColl's research usually relied on British Blue Book collections of consular despatches, written up in a prosecutorial style.

== Sources ==
- Gladstone Correspondence, British Library, 1858.
- Gladstone Papers, 1884, British Library.
