= Sven Ove Hansson =

Swedish philosopher (born 1951)

Sven Ove Hansson (born 1951) is a Swedish philosopher. He is a professor of philosophy and chair of the Department of Philosophy and History of Technology at the Royal Institute of Technology (KTH) in Stockholm, Sweden. He is an author and scientific skeptic, with a special interest in environmental risk assessment, as well as in decision theory and belief revision.

== Career ==
Hansson obtained a bachelor's degree in medical science in 1972, and then worked for a Swedish trade union, followed by a job with the Swedish Social Democrats. He received a PhD in theoretical philosophy at Uppsala University in 1991, following which he was from 1993 to 1999 forskarassistent (the Swedish equivalent of an associate professor) at Uppsala. He received a second PhD in practical philosophy at the University of Lund in 1999, and since 2000 he has been a professor at KTH; he became department head in 2005.

The Swedish Government appointed Hansson to the Products Control Board (1976–1982; the predecessor of the National Chemicals Inspectorate), the National Board for Spent Nuclear Fuel (1981–1992) and the Natural Science Foundation (1989–1992). He continues to write on radiation exposure risk assessment. He was also a member of two temporary Commissions on environmental policies appointed by the Swedish Government, expert advisor to a 1999–2000 Swedish government committee the kemikaliekommittén, and a member of the board of the MISTRA project New Strategy for the risk management of chemical substances. Hansson's contributions on theories of risk assessment have been cited as recently as 2012.

Since December 2000, Hansson has been a member of forskningsberedningen, the Swedish government's advisory board of researchers.

Hansson has contributed to the development of belief revision theory, in particular, analysis of application of the AGM postulates. His work is also cited in discussions of ethics in institutional decision-making. Google Scholar lists 17,417 citations of his work and gives his h-index as 68 and i10-index as 271 . As of 2022 he continues to publish on ethics, logic and public health in major journals.

Since September 1999 he has been the Editor-in-Chief of Theoria, the only international, peer-reviewed, philosophy journal published in Sweden. He was the founding chairperson of the Swedish Skeptics (Vetenskap och Folkbildning), and is still a board member and editor of the organisation's journal Folkvett.

Hansson has criticized anthroposophy as a pseudo-science.

== Publications ==
He has published numerous articles and books in Swedish and in English.

=== Books in English ===
- Decision Theory: A Brief Introduction (PDF). Stockholm: Royal Institute of Technology (KTH). 2005 [1994].
- Setting the Limit. Occupational Health Standards and the Limits of Science. New York: Oxford University Press. 1998. ISBN 9780195121605. OCLC 37533943.
- A Textbook of Belief Dynamics, Theory Change and Database Updating. Dordrecht: Kluwer Academic Publishers. 1999. ISBN 9780792353249. OCLC 39856021.
- The Structure of Values and Norms. Cambridge, UK: Cambridge University Press. 2001. ISBN 9780521792042. OCLC 44841554.
- The Ethics of Risk: Ethical Analysis in an Uncertain World. New York: Palgrave Macmillan. 2013. ISBN 9781137333650. OCLC 842208555.

=== Selected journal articles in English ===
- "New operators for theory change". Theoria. 55 (2): 114–132. August 1989. doi:10.1111/j.1755-2567.1989.tb00725.x.
- "Dimensions of risk". Risk Analysis. 9 (1): 107–112. March 1989. Bibcode:1989RiskA...9..107H. doi:10.1111/j.1539-6924.1989.tb01225.x.
- "Belief contraction without recovery". Studia Logica. 50 (2): 251–260. June 1991. doi:10.1007/BF00370186. JSTOR 20015577. S2CID 206777162.
- "Reversing the Levi identity". Journal of Philosophical Logic. 22 (6): 637–669. December 1993. doi:10.1007/BF01054039. JSTOR 30226517. S2CID 206788140.
- Fuhrmann, André; — (January 1994). "A survey of multiple contractions" (PDF). Journal of Logic, Language and Information. 3 (1): 39–75. doi:10.1007/BF01066356. S2CID 7246932. Archived from the original (PDF) on 2014-12-22.
- "Kernel contraction" (PDF). Journal of Symbolic Logic. 59 (3): 845–849. 1 September 1994. doi:10.2307/2275912. JSTOR 2275912. Archived from the original (PDF) on 12 May 2014.
- "Semi-revision". Journal of Applied Non-Classical Logics. 7 (1–2): 151–175. 1997. doi:10.1080/11663081.1997.10510904.
- "A survey of non-prioritized belief revision". Erkenntnis. 50 (2/3): 413–427. May 1999. doi:10.1023/A:1005534223776. JSTOR 20012926. S2CID 117026488.
- Sandin, Per; Peterson, Martin; —; Rudén, Christina; et al. (2002). "Five charges against the precautionary principle". Journal of Risk Research. 5 (4): 287–299. doi:10.1080/13669870110073729. S2CID 145226582.
