= Bart de Graaff =

Dutch television presenter (1967–2002)

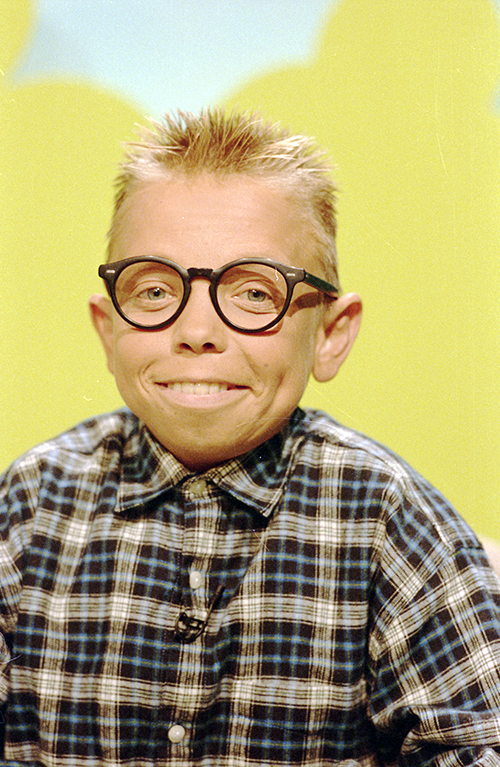
- Bart de Graaff in 1991
- Born: Bart Frederikus de Graaff; 16 April 1967; Haarlem, Netherlands
- Died: 25 May 2002 (aged 35); Leiden, Netherlands
- Occupations: Presenter, comedian

Bart Frederikus de Graaff (Dutch pronunciation: [ˈbɑrt freːdəˈrikʏz‿də ˈɣraːf]; (Note: In isolation, Frederikus is pronounced [freːdəˈrikʏs].) 16 April 1967 – 25 May 2002) was a Dutch television presenter, comedian and creator, as well as the founder and chairman of the public broadcasting network BNN.

== Early life ==
De Graaff was born in Haarlem in the Netherlands in 1967. At 9 years old, while playing outside, he got into an accident involving a car. This accident crushed his leg, leading to a bacterial infection which affected his kidneys. The kidney damage resulted in growth failure, causing him to never grow much taller than an average 12-year-old.

== Career ==
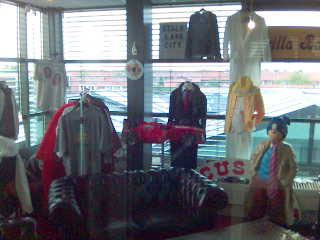
Collection of items of Bart de Graaff

In 1997, he founded a public broadcasting network, Bart's News Network (BNN). After his death, it was renamed to Bart's Neverending Network. Targeted at an audience of teens and young adults, the network quickly became known for its sometimes provocative programming. A television show inspired by his condition, De Grote Donorshow (The Big Donor Show), won an Emmy Award for Best Non-scripted Entertainment.

== Death ==
At the end of 1997, De Graaff received a donor kidney and was for a time able to live a relatively normal life. In 1999, his body rejected the kidney and his health deteriorated quickly. De Graaff died on 25 May 2002 at the age of 35.

De Graaff was posthumously awarded the Golden Statue ("Gouden Beeld" in Dutch) in the category Career Award ("Carrière-award" in Dutch) in 2002.
