= William Andrew (publisher) =

William Andrew is a technical publishing house and an imprint of Elsevier.

The publisher was founded as an independent publisher in 1990, providing technical databooks to the plastics industry. They are based in Norwich, New York. In 1999, they purchased Noyes Publications. After an 18-month shared distribution agreement, Elsevier purchased William Andrew in January, 2009.
