= Hugh MacColl =

Scottish mathematician and novelist (1837–1909)

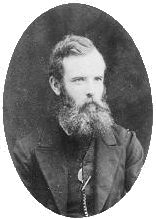
- MacColl in 1886
- Born: 11 January 1837; Strontian, Argyllshire, Scotland
- Died: 27 December 1909 (aged 72); Boulogne-sur-Mer, France
- Education: University of London (BA, 1876)
- Occupations: Mathematician; logician; novelist
- Known for: Early systems of propositional calculus and modal logic
- Relatives: Malcolm MacColl (brother)

Hugh MacColl (before April 1885 spelled as Hugh McColl; 1837–1909) was a Scottish mathematician, logician and novelist.

== Life ==
MacColl was the youngest son of a poor Highland family that was at least partly Gaelic-speaking. Hugh's father died when he was still an infant, and Hugh was educated thanks to the efforts of his elder brother Malcolm MacColl, an Episcopalian clergyman and friend and political ally of William Ewart Gladstone. Early in his acquaintanceship with Gladstone, Malcolm MacColl persuaded the Liberal politician to provide funds for Hugh's education at Oxford University. It was proposed to send him to Oxford University's St. Edmund Hall, but Gladstone made this conditional on Hugh MacColl agreeing to take orders in the Church of England. Hugh MacColl refused this condition and, as a result, never obtained a conventional residential university education, which may have limited his contribution to philosophy, and certainly prevented him from ever obtaining a formal academic position. He nevertheless earned a BA in mathematics from the University of London as an external student in 1876.

After a few years working in different areas of Great Britain, MacColl relocated to Boulogne-sur-Mer, in France on the Channel, where he developed the greater part of his work and became a French citizen. MacColl was not obscure during his time. He was a lifelong regular contributor to the Educational Times. His correspondents included the logicians William Stanley Jevons and Charles Sanders Peirce. He also corresponded, and argued in print, with the young Bertrand Russell, and reviewed Alfred North Whitehead's 1898 Universal Algebra for Mind magazine.

== Works ==
MacColl is known for three main accomplishments in formal and philosophical logic:

- During 1877–1879, while working out a problem involving integration, he published a four-part article establishing the first known variant of the propositional calculus, terming it the "calculus of equivalent statements", preceding Gottlob Frege's Begriffsschrift. He subsequently published 11 articles in Mind magazine, during the period 1880–1908, and a text, in an effort to attract the attention of philosophers to his work.
- Anticipation of Clarence Irving Lewis's systems of strict implication, in work with which Lewis was familiar.
- Construction of a logical system including later modal logics, namely the system T of Robert Feys and Georg Henrik von Wright, and system S5 of Lewis from 1918.

MacColl also published two novels, Mr. Stranger's Sealed Packet (1889), concerning a journey to Mars and a utopian Martian society, and Ednor Whitlock (1891), dealing with a crisis of faith occasioned by exposure to new scientific ideas. While described by a recent critic as "best left unread", the novels reveal social and moral values to which the author gave full expression in his 1909 publication Man's Origin, Destiny, and Duty, an apology for Christianity.

== Legacy ==
There is presently a long-term MacColl Project, a joint venture of Greifswald University in Germany and the University of Oslo, which intends to publish a critical edition of his work. Furthermore, the group of logic and epistemology at the University of Lille (France) develop MacColl's suggestions for a dynamic free logic. The December 1999 issue of the magazine Nordic Journal of Philosophical Logic published the proceedings of a 1998 conference devoted to MacColl's work.
