= Digital Commons (Elsevier) =

Institutional repository platform

Digital Commons is a commercial, hosted institutional repository platform owned by RELX Group. This hosted service, licensed by bepress, is used by over 600 academic institutions, healthcare centers, public libraries, and research centers to showcase their scholarly output and special collections.

== Features ==
Digital Commons is a hosted institutional repository and publishing platform. Digital Commons supports OAI-PMH version 2.0. Metadata is exposed through the OAI. Content published to Digital Commons institutional repositories is optimized for indexing by Google, Google Scholar, and other major search engines.

Digital Commons supports a variety of publication and editorial workflows, as well as peer review. Content is uploaded through batch uploads or via a customizable submit form. It can also link to documents hosted on an external website.

Digital Commons provides user notification tools and options for social sharing. These include RSS feeds and automatic email notification for reports of newly published content, mailing list manager to announce newly published research and social sharing buttons. Digital Commons also provides individual readership statistics to users through its Author Dashboard.

== History ==
In 2002, bepress, then known as the Berkeley Electronic Press, partnered with the California Digital Library to create the eScholarship Repository This entailed "hiding" some of the more sophisticated features of the existing journal publishing system, while adding features such as compliance with the OAI-PMH harvesting protocol.

In June 2004, bepress officially launched its Digital Commons institutional repository software at the American Library Association annual conference.

From 2004 to July 2007, Digital Commons was licensed exclusively by ProQuest Information and Learning. As of July 2007, bepress resumed licensing Digital Commons directly to subscribers.

In August 2017, it was announced that Elsevier had acquired bepress, drawing criticism from customers and the wider library community.
