= Patrick Lodiers =

Dutch television and radio presenter

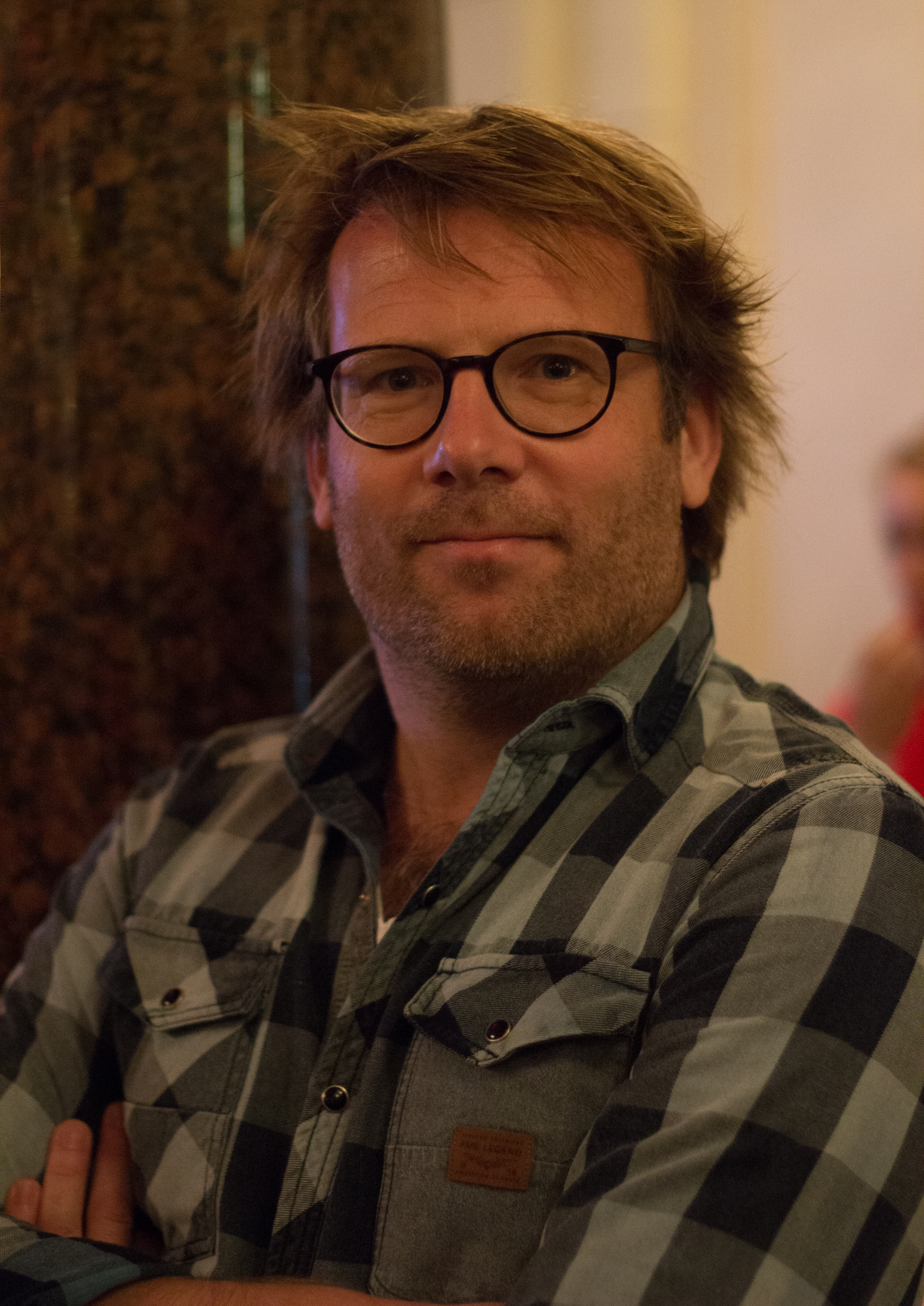
- Lodiers in 2015
- Born: Patrick Emanuel Martinus Lodiers; 25 October 1971 (age 55); Vlissingen, Netherlands
- Occupations: Television and radio presenter

Patrick Emanuel Martinus Lodiers (born 25 October 1971) is a Dutch television and radio presenter and former chairman of the broadcaster BNN. His television work includes the improvisational comedy programme De Lama's, the documentary series Over Mijn Lijk and The Big Donor Show.

== Early life ==
Lodiers was born in Vlissingen. He studied at the St. Lukas film academy in Brussels and made several short films after completing his education. He then worked in television at Canal Plus Vlaanderen as a director and columnist.

== Broadcasting career ==
Lodiers joined BNN in 2001, presenting Je zal het maar hebben, a programme in which young people talk about living with illness or a disability. His subsequent programmes included De Lama's and Over Mijn Lijk, which follows young people with terminal illnesses. De Lama's won the Gouden Televizier-Ring in 2006.

In 2007 Lodiers presented De Grote Donorshow (The Big Donor Show). The programme appeared to feature a terminally ill woman choosing which of three patients would receive her kidney. At the end of the broadcast, Lodiers revealed that the supposed donor was an actress; the patients were real and had participated in the deception. The show aimed to draw attention to the shortage of donor organs and had attracted criticism before it aired. It won the 2008 International Emmy for non-scripted entertainment. Lodiers dedicated the award to people waiting for organ transplants.

Lodiers became chairman of BNN on 1 December 2007 while continuing to present programmes. In Patrick in Uruzgan, he followed Dutch soldiers deployed to Afghanistan. He left BNN in 2014 for KRO-NCRV, where he became the presenter of De Reünie.

In 2017 Lodiers began presenting the current affairs programme De Nieuws BV on NPO Radio 1. His final broadcast on the programme was in February 2024; he said his departure was not his own choice. From 2023 he also presented the television quiz The Connection.

== Suicide prevention ==
In the 2021 television series Leven voor de Dood, Lodiers followed people living with suicidal thoughts. He became chairman of the 113 suicide prevention fund in 2023. The fund supports research and campaigns intended to prevent suicide.
