= Logical Analysis and History of Philosophy =

History of Philosophy & Logical Analysis
- Discipline: Philosophy
- Language: English, German

Standard abbreviations
- ISO 4: Log. Anal. Hist. Philos.

Links
- Journal homepage

History of Philosophy & Logical Analysis is a peer-reviewed journal of philosophy. The journal publishes original work, focusing on interpreting classical philosophical texts by drawing on the resources of modern formal logic. Logical analysis is an instrument of interpretation to shift the interpretive focus from the purely exegetical approach towards a given text to the systematic reconstruction of a theory that concerns the issues that are discussed. In this way, novel questions can be presented. New insight with regard to classical texts ensue, so that these are even more fruitful in dealing with the modern philosophy. Articles are published in English and German; the journal is also known as Philosophiegeschichte und logische Analyse.

== See also ==
- List of philosophy journals
