= Nordic Journal of Philosophical Logic =

- Discipline: Philosophical logic
- Language: English
- Edited by: Andrew J.I. Jones

Publication details
- History: 1996–2001
- Publisher: University of Oslo (Norway)
- Frequency: Biannual

Standard abbreviations
- ISO 4: Nord. J. Philos. Log.

Indexing
- ISSN: 0806-6205 (print); 0806-6213 (web)
- OCLC no.: 222264810

Links
- Journal homepage; Journal page at Taylor & Francis; Archive at Taylor & Francis

The Nordic Journal of Philosophical Logic was a biannual academic journal of philosophy started in May 1996. The journal considered submissions in any of the areas associated with philosophical logic and with the application of logic in conceptual analysis. The journal was edited at the Department of Philosophy, University of Oslo. Issues and articles were freely available over the internet, and are still available at the journal's website. Around 2000 the journal transferred to Taylor & Francis, who issued two volumes, but the last one appeared in 2001. The issues of the journal published before the transfer of the journal to Taylor & Francis are available at its archive at the University of Oslo.

== History ==
The Nordic Journal of Philosophical Logic was an English-language scholarly journal devoted to philosophical logic. It was published by Scandinavian University Press in Oslo and was associated with the Department of Philosophy at the University of Oslo. The journal was published from 1996 until 2001. It was peer-reviewed and had an international authorship. It was subsequently published by Taylor & Francis, which maintains an archive of the two volumes it published and records the publication of the last issue in 2001.

The journal was indexed in bibliographic databases including PASCAL/Francis and EBSCO Academic Search.

== Important articles ==
The journal published papers by the influential philosophers of mathematics and logicians Hao Wang, Per Martin-Löf, and Jaakko Hintikka as well as by other important logicians. In 1998 the journal had a special issue on the Scottish logician, Hugh MacColl.

== See also ==
- List of philosophy journals
