= Miscellanea Logica =

Miscellanea Logica is an academic journal of logic based at the Charles University in Prague. It is part of Acta Universitatis Carolinae.
