= Donald Saklofske =

Canadian psychologist

- Education: University of Calgary
- Known for: Differential psychology
- Awards: Fellowship in the Association for Psychological Science (2005)
- Scientific career
- Fields: Psychology
- Institutions: University of Western Ontario
- Thesis: An investigation of Berlyne's theory of aesthetics and psychobiology (1973)

Donald Harold Saklofske is a Canadian psychologist and professor in the Department of Psychology at the University of Western Ontario. He is a former president of the International Society for the Study of Individual Differences and the current editor-in-chief of its official journal, Personality and Individual Differences. He is also editor-in-chief of the Journal of Psychoeducational Assessment. He is a fellow of the Association for Psychological Science, the Canadian Psychological Association, and the Society for Personality and Social Psychology.
