= Paul Kline =

British psychologist (1937–1999)

- Born: 1937
- Died: 1999 (aged 61–62)

Academic background
- Education: University of Reading, University College Swansea, University of Aberdeen, University of Manchester
- Theses: An investigation into the attitudes to their teacher training of teachers with two years' experience (1963 (Aber)); Investigation into the Freudian Concept of the Anal Character (1967 (Man))

Academic work
- Discipline: Psychology
- Sub-discipline: Psychometrics
- Institutions: University of Exeter

Paul Kline (1937 – 25 September 1999) was a British psychologist noted for his contribution to psychometrics.

== Career ==
Kline was originally educated in classics, in education, and in statistics: he studied at the University of Reading, University College Swansea, the University of Aberdeen and the University of Manchester. When he first joined the University of Exeter, it was as a staff member in the university's then Institute of Education. However, in 1969 he joined the Department of Psychology as a Lecturer, rising eventually to become the university's first Professor of Psychometrics.

== Research ==
Kline was interested in depth psychology, especially theories of Sigmund Freud, the founder of psychoanalysis. He was also an expert in psychometrics and carried out extensive research in the statistical analysis of personality and intelligence.

In his 1972 book Fact and Fantasy in Freudian Theory, widely translated, he brought these two interests together, examining the objective evidence for various ideas of Freudian theory, finding that some, but not all, were supported by the evidence. He also wrote introductory books to psychometrics, for example An easy guide to factor analysis (1994). He was a prolific author, writing or editing at least 14 books, and over 150 scientific papers are listed under his name in Web of Science.

Among colleagues, Kline had a reputation as an opinionated controversialist who remained a genial and supportive colleague; he was revered by students for the wit and clarity of his lectures.

== Publications ==
- Fact and fantasy in Freudian Theory (1972/1981)
- Psychometrics and psychology (1979)
- Personality : measurement and theory (1983)
- A handbook of test construction : introduction to psychometric design (1986)
- Intelligence : the psychometric view (1991)
- The Handbook of Psychological Testing (1993/2000)
- An easy guide to factor analysis (1994)
- The new psychometrics : science, psychology, and measurement (2000/2014)
