= Pete Hatemi =

American political scientist

Peter Hatemi
- Education: University of Nebraska–Lincoln; Queensland Institute of Medical Research; Virginia Institute for Psychiatric and Behavioral Genetics
- Known for: Genetics of social and political traits
- Scientific career
- Fields: Political science Psychology; Behavior genetics
- Institutions: Pennsylvania State University
- Thesis: The genetics of political attitudes (2007)
- Doctoral advisor: John Hibbing

Peter K. Hatemi is an American political scientist and Distinguished Professor of Political Science, co-fund in Microbiology and Biochemistry at Pennsylvania State University. He is known for his research on the relationship between genetic factors and political attitudes and ideologies, the influence of narcissism on political attitudes as well as the underpinnings of violent behavior. He has also studied the relationship that other factors have to political orientations, finding that an individual's personality traits or moral foundations have no causal role in one's political orientations, but rather, that if there is a causal path, it is from political orientations to one's morals and personality traits.
