= Journal of Logical and Algebraic Methods in Programming =

- Discipline: Computer science
- Language: English

Publication details
- History: 1984–present
- Publisher: Elsevier
- Frequency: Bimonthly

Standard abbreviations
- ISO 4: J. Log. Algebr. Methods Program.

Indexing
- Journal of Logical and Algebraic Methods in Programming
- ISSN: 2352-2208 (print); 2352-2216 (web)
- LCCN: 2016205291
- Journal of Logic and Algebraic Programming
- CODEN: JLAPAJ
- ISSN: 1567-8326 (print); 1873-5940 (web)
- LCCN: 2001249000
- Journal of Logic Programming
- CODEN: JLPRE2
- ISSN: 0743-1066 (print); 1873-5789 (web)
- LCCN: sf96091377

Links
- Journal homepage

The Journal of Logical and Algebraic Methods in Programming is a peer-reviewed scientific journal established in 1984. It was originally titled The Journal of Logic Programming; in 2001 it was renamed The Journal of Logic and Algebraic Programming, and in 2014 it obtained its current title.

The founding editor-in-chief was J. Alan Robinson. From 1984 to 2000 it was the official journal of the Association of Logic Programming. In 2000, the association and the then editorial board started a new journal under the name Theory and Practice of Logic Programming, published by Cambridge University Press. Elsevier continued the journal with a new editorial board under the title Journal of Logic and Algebraic Programming.

According to the Journal Citation Reports, the journal has a 2013 impact factor of 0.383.

== See also ==
- Elsevier § Resignation of editorial boards
