= Theoria (philosophy journal) =

- Discipline: Philosophy
- Language: English
- Edited by: Sven Ove Hansson

Publication details
- History: 1935–present
- Publisher: Wiley-Blackwell on behalf of Stiftelsen Theoria
- Frequency: Quarterly

Standard abbreviations
- ISO 4: Theoria

Indexing
- ISSN: 0040-5825 (print); 1755-2567 (web)

Links
- Journal homepage; Online access

Theoria: A Swedish Journal of Philosophy and Psychology is a peer-reviewed academic journal publishing research in all areas of philosophy established in 1935 by Åke Petzäll (sv). It is published quarterly by Wiley-Blackwell on behalf of Stiftelsen Theoria. The current editor-in-chief is Sven Ove Hansson. Theoria publishes articles, reviews, and shorter notes and discussions.

== Editors ==
1935–1957	Åke Petzäll (sv)
1957–1964	Konrad Marc-Wogau (de)
1965–1969	Sören Halldén (sv), Mats Furberg (sv) and Dag Prawitz
1969–1978	Krister Segerberg
1978–1984	Peter Gärdenfors
1978–1994	Bengt Hansson
1995–1998	Wlodek Rabinowicz
1999–present	Sven Ove Hansson

== Notable articles ==
Among the contributions to philosophy, logic, and mathematics first published in Theoria are:

- Carl Gustav Hempel, Le problème de la vérité, Theoria 3, 1937, 206–244. (Hempel's confirmation paradoxes)
- Ernst Cassirer, Was ist "Subjektivismus"?, Theoria 5, 1939, 111–140.
- Alf Ross, Imperatives and Logic, Theoria 7, 1941, 53–71. (Ross' deontic paradox)
- Georg Henrik von Wright, The Paradoxes of Confirmation, Theoria 31, 1965, 255–274.
- Per Lindström, First Order Predicate Logic with Generalized Quantifiers, Theoria 32, 1966, 186–195. (Lindström quantifiers)
- Per Lindström, On Extensions of Elementary Logic, Theoria 35, 1969, 1–11. (Lindström's theorem)
- Richard Montague, Universal Grammar, Theoria 36, 1970, 373–398. (Montague's universal grammar)
- Michael Ruse, The Revolution in Biology, Theoria 36, 1970, 1–22.
- Charles Leonard Hamblin, Mathematical models of dialogue. Theoria 37, 1971, 130–155.
- David Lewis, Are We Free to Break the Laws?, Theoria 47, 1981, 113–121.
- Carlos E. Alchourrón & David Makinson, On the Logic of Theory Change: Contraction Functions and their Associated Revision Functions, Theoria 48, 1982, 14–37.
- W.V. Quine, Assuming Objects, Theoria 60, 1994, 171–183.
- Donald Davidson, On Quine's Philosophy, Theoria 60, 1994, 184–192.
- Donald Davidson & W.V. Quine, Exchange Between Donald Davidson and W.V. Quine Following Davidson's Lecture, Theoria 60, 1994, 226–231.
- Michael Dummett, Bivalence and Vagueness, Theoria 61, 1995, 201–216.
- Lars Bergström, Reflections on Consequentialism, Theoria 62, 1996, 74–94.
- David Lewis, Rights to Rights, Theoria 69, 2003, 160–165.
- Saul Kripke, Frege's Theory of Sense and Reference: Some Exegetical Notes, Theoria 74, 2008, 181–218.
