= Bulletin of the Section of Logic =

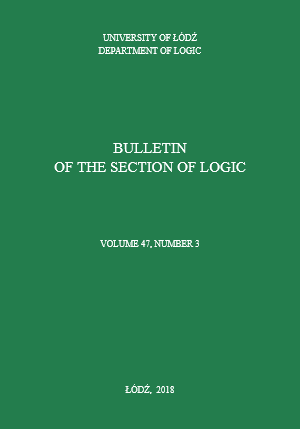
- Discipline: Logic
- Language: English
- Edited by: Grzegorz Malinowski

Publication details
- History: 1972–present
- Publisher: Lodz University Press (Poland)
- Frequency: Quarterly
- Open access: Yes

Standard abbreviations
- ISO 4: Bull. Sect. Log.
- MathSciNet: Bull. Sect. Logic Univ. Lódź

Indexing
- ISSN: 0138-0680 (print); 2449-836X (web)
- OCLC no.: 7831843665

Links
- Journal homepage; Online archive

The Bulletin of the Section of Logic is a quarterly peer-reviewed academic journal covering logic, published by Lodz University Press in collaboration with the Section of Logic of the Polish Academy of Sciences. It was established in 1972 by Ryszard Wójcicki (Polish Academy of Sciences), as a newsletter-journal designed for the exchange of results among members of the section with their national and international partners, as well as their collaborators. The journal focusses on logical calculi, their methodology, applications, and algebraic interpretations. The editor-in-chief is Andrzej Indrzejczak (University of Łódź).

== Abstracting and indexing ==
The journal is abstracted and indexed in Scopus, Philosopher's Index, and zbMath.
