= BNN (Dutch broadcaster) =

1997–2014 Dutch public broadcaster

- Type: Public broadcasting
- Country: Netherlands
- Availability: Netherlands
- Founded: 1997 by Bart de Graaff, Gerard Timmer, and Frank Timmer
- Dissolved: 1 January 2014
- Former names: Bart's News Network (1997–1998); Brutaal News Network (1998–2002)
- Official website: bnn.nl
- Replaced by: BNNVARA

BNN (Dutch pronunciation: [ˌbijɛnˈɛn]), short for Bart's Neverending Network (formerly Bart's News Network and later Brutaal News Network, as a pun on CNN), was a Dutch public broadcasting association supported by Netherlands Public Broadcasting. BNN was founded in 1997 by Bart de Graaff, Gerard Timmer and Frank Timmer and targeted teenagers and young adults. It produced entertainment and information television programming, radio programming, and feature films. Some of BNN's programming dealt with controversial subject matter, including most famously, a hoax reality special made to help raise awareness of the shortage of organ donors in the Netherlands.

== History ==
BNN became a public broadcasting association as a part of the Netherlands Public Broadcasting system on 15 August 1997, replacing former member Veronica. While Dutch media in general is known to be liberal in coverage of sexuality and drugs, even BNN's programming has been considered controversial.

Some of BNN's programs have included "Try Before You Die" – where presenters attempted to do things that they think people should do at least once in their life, made headlines when presenter Sander Lantinga acted as a streaker during a quarter-finals match at Wimbledon between Maria Sharapova and Elena Dementieva.

In May 2007, five years after the death of Bart de Graaff, who had suffered from kidney failure for almost all of his life, BNN announced "De Grote Donorshow" (The Big Donor Show), an initiative for promoting the filling in of a codicil for organ donation, in which three contestants would strive to be the recipient of a kidney donated by a terminally ill woman. The show aired on 1 June; at the end of the show it was revealed to be a hoax, attempting to draw attention to the low number of organ donors in the country.

BNN merged with the VARA on 1 January 2014 to form BNN-VARA.

== Notable television shows ==
- Cash Cab (Dutch version)
- De Grote Donorshow
- De Lama's
- Neuken doe je zo!
- Spuiten en Slikken

== Presenters ==
- Bart de Graaff (1998–2002)
- Bridget Maasland (2000–2005)
- Eric Corton (2005–2017)
- Edo Brunner (2006)
- Hanna Verboom (2004–2006, 2008)
- Katja Schuurman (2001–2008, 2013–2014)
- Ramon Stoppelenburg (2005)
- Nicolette Kluiver (2006–2013)
- Patrick Lodiers (2001–2014)
- Ruud de Wild (1998–2004)
- Sander Lantinga (2005–2015)
- Wouter van der Goes (2004–2006)
- Yolanthe Cabau van Kasbergen (2007–2008)
- Floortje Dessing (2009–2015)
