= Bepress =

Subsidiary of RELX Group

- Parent company: RELX Group
- Founded: 1999
- Founder: Robert D. Cooter and Aaron S. Edlin
- Country of origin: United States
- Headquarters location: Berkeley, California
- Official website: www.bepress.com

Bepress is a commercial, academic software firm owned by RELX Group. It began in 1999 as the Berkeley Electronic Press, co-founded by academics Robert Cooter and Aaron Edlin. It makes products and services to support scholarly communication, including institutional repository and publishing software. Until September 2011 it also published electronic journals.

In August 2017, Bepress was acquired by RELX Group for an undisclosed amount, reported to be around £100 million ($129.3 million). The acquisition drew criticism from the library community.

== Services ==
=== Open access publication tools ===
- Digital Commons is an institutional repository and publishing software suite that allows institutions to showcase and preserve their scholarly output.
- Selected Works enables individuals to create their own scholarly research pages.

=== Submission and editorial management tools ===
- ExpressO aids legal scholars in submitting their research to the law reviews of their choice.
- LawKit is a tool designed specifically for law review editors to track submissions, communicate with authors, and manage expedite requests.
- Edikit helps journal editors and conference organizers to manage the peer-review process.

=== Bepress portals ===
- The Digital Commons Network is a discovery tool for all Digital Commons sites
- The Law Review Commons is an index to law reviews published using Digital Commons
- The Bepress Legal Repository allows scholars and interested individuals to browse subject matter repositories in Law.
- Cobra allows scholars and interested individuals to browse subject matter repositories in Biostatistics.

== Journals ==
Bepress published electronic journals in the social sciences, law, medicine, and natural sciences, before selling the portfolio to Walter de Gruyter in September 2011. It published its first journals in December 2000, with the exception of Studies in Nonlinear Dynamics and Econometrics, which existed as a peer-reviewed academic journal prior to its incorporation into the Bepress system. The journals included The B.E. Journal of Economic Analysis and Policy, The B.E. Journal of Macroeconomics, and The B.E. Journal of Theoretical Economics.
