= Journal of Applied Non-Classical Logics =

- Discipline: Non-classical logic
- Language: English

Publication details
- History: 1991-present
- Publisher: Taylor & Francis

Standard abbreviations
- ISO 4: J. Appl. Non-Class. Log.

Indexing
- ISSN: 1166-3081 (print); 1958-5780 (web)

Links
- Journal homepage; Online access; Online archive

Journal of Applied Non-Classical Logics is a peer-reviewed academic journal published by Taylor & Francis. It focusses on non-classical logic, in particular formal aspects (completeness, decidability, complexity), applications to artificial Intelligence and cognitive science (knowledge representation, automated reasoning, natural language processing), and theoretical computer science (program verification, program synthesis). The journal was established in 1991 by Luis Fariñas del Cerro, who was its editor-in-chief until 2014. He was succeeded in 2015 by Andreas Herzig.
