= List of Elsevier periodicals =

This is a list of notable scientific, technical and general interest periodicals published by Elsevier or one of its imprints or subsidiary companies.

== A ==
- Acta Biomaterialia
- Acta Materialia
- Advanced Engineering Informatics
- Advances in Applied Mathematics
- Advances in Ecological Research
- Advances in Mathematics
- Advances in Space Research
- Ageing Research Reviews
- Agricultural and Forest Meteorology
- American Academy of Physical Medicine and Rehabilitation
- American Journal of Cardiology
- American Journal of Emergency Medicine
- The American Journal of Medicine
- American Journal of Obstetrics and Gynecology
- Analytica Chimica Acta
- Animal Behaviour
- Annals of Anatomy
- Annals of Emergency Medicine
- Annals of Epidemiology
- The Annals of Thoracic Surgery
- Annals of Pure and Applied Logic
- Antiviral Research
- AORN Journal
- Applied Energy
- Applied Geochemistry
- Aquatic Botany
- Aquatic Toxicology
- Artificial Intelligence
- Astroparticle Physics
- Atherosclerosis
- Atmospheric Research
- Australasian Journal of Bone & Joint Medicine
- Automation in Construction

== B ==
- Behavioural Brain Research
- Biochemical and Biophysical Research Communications
- Biochemical Pharmacology
- Biochimica et Biophysica Acta
- Biochimie
- Biological Psychiatry
- Bioorganic & Medicinal Chemistry
- Bioorganic & Medicinal Chemistry Letters
- Bioresource Technology
- Biosensors and Bioelectronics
- Birmingham Daily News
- Brain Research
- Brain Research Bulletin
- The Breast
- British Accounting Review
- Business Horizons

== C ==
- Cancer Epidemiology
- Cancer Letters
- Carbon
- Cell
- Cell Stem Cell
- Chemical Engineering Science
- Chemical Physics Letters
- Chemico-Biological Interactions
- Chemometrics and Intelligent Laboratory Systems
- Chemosphere
- Clinical Gastroenterology and Hepatology
- Cognitive Systems Research
- Comptes rendus de l'Académie des sciences
- Computational Biology and Chemistry
- Computational Materials Science
- Computer Law and Security Report
- Computer Networks
- Computer Physics Communications
- Computers and Mathematics with Applications
- Computers in Biology and Medicine
- Computers & Graphics
- Computers in Human Behavior
- Consciousness and Cognition
- Construction Law Journal
- Contemporary Clinical Trials
- Cortex
- Cretaceous Research
- Current Biology
- Current Opinion

== D ==
- Data and Knowledge Engineering
- Developmental Biology
- Discrete Mathematics
- DNA Repair
- Drug Discovery Today

== E ==
- Early Childhood Research Quarterly
- Earth and Planetary Science Letters
- Economics and Human Biology
- Economics Letters
- Education for Chemical Engineers
- Electronic Notes in Theoretical Computer Science
- Electronics Weekly
- Elsevier Weekblad
- Energy
- Energy Economics
- Energy Policy
- Energy Procedia
- Energy Reports
- Environmental Research
- eTransportation
- European Journal of Cancer
- European Journal of Cell Biology
- European Journal of Combinatorics
- European Journal of Integrative Medicine
- European Journal of Medicinal Chemistry
- European Journal of Pharmacology
- European Neural Network Society
- European Neuropsychopharmacology
- European Psychiatry
- European Safety and Reliability Association
- Evolution and Human Behavior
- Experimental Neurology
- Explorations in Economic History

== F ==
- FEBS Letters
- Fire Safety Journal
- Fitoterapia
- Flight International
- Fluid Phase Equilibria
- Food Research International
- Fungal Biology
- Fungal Genetics and Biology
- Futures
- Fuzzy Sets and Systems

== G ==
- Games and Economic Behavior
- Gastroenterology
- Gene
- Genomics
- Geobios
- Geochimica et Cosmochimica Acta
- Geoforum
- Gynecologic Oncology

== H ==
- Heart Rhythm
- Historia Mathematica
- Human Immunology

== I ==
- Icarus
- III-Vs Review
- Indagationes Mathematicae
- Information and Computation
- Information Processing Letters
- Infrared Physics and Technology
- Inorganica Chimica Acta
- Integrative Medicine Research
- Intelligence
- International Behavioral Neuroscience Society
- International Encyclopedia of Human Geography
- International Journal for Parasitology
- International Journal of Cardiology
- International Journal of Developmental Neuroscience
- International Journal of Forecasting
- International Journal of Greenhouse Gas Control
- International Journal of Hydrogen Energy
- International Journal of Mass Spectrometry
- International Journal of Oral and Maxillofacial Surgery
- International Journal of Pharmaceutics
- International Journal of Plasticity
- International Review of Cell and Molecular Biology
- International Society of Automation

== J ==
- Japan and the World Economy
- Journal de Mathématiques Pures et Appliquées
- The Journal for Nurse Practitioners
- The Journal of Academic Librarianship
- Journal of Algebra
- The Journal of Allergy and Clinical Immunology
- Journal of the American College of Cardiology
- Journal of the American Medical Directors Association
- Journal of the American Society for Mass Spectrometry
- Journal of Anthropological Archaeology
- Journal of Applied Economics
- Journal of Approximation Theory
- Journal of the Association of Nurses in AIDS Care
- Journal of Biomedical Informatics
- Journal of Catalysis
- Journal of Chemical Thermodynamics
- Journal of Chromatography B
- Journal of Cleaner Production
- Journal of Clinical Epidemiology
- Journal of Colloid and Interface Science
- Journal of Combinatorial Theory
- Journal of Computational Physics
- Journal of Computer and System Sciences
- Journal of Controlled Release
- Journal of Cultural Heritage
- Journal of Development Economics
- Journal of Economic Behavior and Organization
- Journal of Economic Dynamics and Control
- Journal of Economic Theory
- Journal of Electroanalytical Chemistry
- Journal of Endodontics
- Journal of Environmental Management
- Journal of Environmental Psychology
- Journal of Experimental Social Psychology
- Journal of Health Economics
- Journal of Human Evolution
- Journal of Infection
- Journal of International Economics
- Journal of International Money and Finance
- Journal of Invertebrate Pathology
- Journal of Luminescence
- Journal of Macroeconomics
- Journal of Magnetism and Magnetic Materials
- Journal of Manipulative and Physiological Therapeutics
- Journal of Mathematical Analysis and Applications
- Journal of Medieval History
- Journal of Memory and Language
- Journal of Molecular Biology
- Journal of Molecular Medicine
- Journal of Molecular Structure
- Journal of Monetary Economics
- Journal of Nuclear Materials
- Journal of Number Theory
- Journal of Oral and Maxillofacial Surgery
- Journal of Organometallic Chemistry
- Journal of Orthopaedic Nursing
- The Journal of Pediatrics
- Journal of PeriAnesthesia Nursing
- Journal of Phonetics
- Journal of Photochemistry and Photobiology
- Journal of Power Sources
- Journal of Pragmatics
- Journal of Psychosomatic Research
- Journal of Research in Personality
- Journal of Second Language Writing
- Journal of Sound and Vibration
- Journal of Symbolic Computation
- Journal of Systems and Software
- Journal of the Mechanics and Physics of Solids
- Journal of Theoretical Biology
- Journal of Thoracic and Cardiovascular Surgery
- The Journal of Urology
- Journal of Volcanology and Geothermal Research
- Journal of Web Semantics

== L ==
- The Lancet
- Language Sciences
- Le Praticien en Anesthésie Réanimation
- Learning and Individual Differences
- Lebensmittel-Wissenschaft & Technologie
- Life Sciences
- Lingua
- Lung Cancer

== M ==
- Magnetic Resonance Imaging
- Marine Chemistry
- Materials Science and Engineering R
- Materials Today
- Maturitas
- Mechanisms of Development
- Medical Hypotheses
- Metamaterials
- Molecular and Cellular Endocrinology
- Molecular Oncology
- Molecular Phylogenetics and Evolution
- Multichannel News
- Mutation Research

== N ==
- Nano Today
- Neural Networks
- Neurobiology of Aging
- Neurocomputing
- NeuroImage
- Neuromuscular Disorders
- Neuropharmacology
- Neuropsychologia
- Neuroscience
- Neuroscience & Biobehavioral Reviews
- Neuroscience Letters
- New Biotechnology
- New Scientist
- Nuclear Instruments and Methods in Physics Research
- Nuclear Physics

== O ==
- Ocean Modelling
- Optical Fiber Technology
- Optical Materials
- Optics Communications
- Optik
- Oral Oncology
- Oral Surgery, Oral Medicine, Oral Pathology, Oral Radiology, and Endodontology
- Orbis
- Osteoarthritis and Cartilage
- Osteopathic Family Physician

== P ==
- Polymer
- Palaeoworld
- Peptides
- Performance Evaluation
- Personality and Individual Differences
- Pharmacology & Therapeutics
- Photonics and Nanostructures: Fundamentals and Applications
- Physica
- Physics Letters
- Physics of the Earth and Planetary Interiors
- Physics Reports
- Physiology & Behavior
- Phytochemistry
- Placenta
- Planetary and Space Science
- Poetics
- Polyhedron
- Principles of Neural Science
- Procedia
- Process Biochemistry
- Progress in Lipid Research
- Progress in Materials Science
- Pulmonary Pharmacology & Therapeutics

== R ==
- Religion
- Renewable and Sustainable Energy Reviews
- Renewable Energy
- Reports on Mathematical Physics
- Respiratory Medicine
- Restaurants & Institutions
- Rheumatic Disease Clinics of North America

== S ==
- Safety Science
- Science and Consciousness Review
- Science and Technology of Advanced Materials
- Sexologies: European Journal of Sexual Health
- Smart Energy
- Social Science & Medicine
- The Social Science Journal
- Solar Energy
- Solar Energy Materials and Solar Cells
- Solid State Communications
- The Spine Journal
- Stochastic Processes and their Applications
- Surface Science Reports
- Surgical Outcomes Analysis and Research
- Synthetic Metals
- System

== T ==
- Talanta
- Taxation Magazine
- Technological Forecasting and Social Change
- Tetrahedron
- Theoretical Computer Science
- Theoretical Population Biology
- Thin Solid Films
- Time Matters
- Topology
- Topology and its Applications
- Toxicology
- Toxicology and Applied Pharmacology
- Toxicology Letters
- Toxicon
- Transplantation Proceedings
- Transportation Research Part A
- Transportation Research Part D
- Transportation Research Part E
- Trends in Food Science and Technology

== U ==
- Ultramicroscopy
- Urology

== V ==
- Vaccine
- Variety
- Veterinary Parasitology
- Virology
- Virus Research
- Vision Research

== W ==
- Water Research
- Wave Motion
- Wear
- World Development

== Z ==
- Zeitschrift für Evidenz, Fortbildung und Qualität im Gesundheitswesen

== See also ==
- 2collab
- Beilstein database
- ChoicePoint
- Compendex
- Concentration of media ownership
- The Cost of Knowledge campaign
- EMBASE
- LexisNexis
- ScienceDirect
- Scirus
- Scopus
