= FEBS Open Bio =

- Discipline: Molecular biology
- Language: English
- Edited by: Miguel De la Rosa

Publication details
- History: 2011-present
- Publisher: John Wiley & Sons on behalf of the Federation of European Biochemical Societies
- Frequency: Monthly
- Open access: Yes
- License: CC BY
- Impact factor: 2.79 (2021)

Standard abbreviations
- ISO 4: FEBS Open Bio

Indexing
- CODEN: FOBEB3
- ISSN: 2211-5463
- OCLC no.: 772465870

Links
- Journal homepage; Online archive

FEBS Open Bio is a monthly peer-reviewed open access scientific journal covering research and education in molecular and cellular life sciences. It was established in 2011 and is published by John Wiley & Sons on behalf of the Federation of European Biochemical Societies (FEBS). According to the journal, papers are not to be excluded on the basis of lack of perceived importance.

Articles originally submitted to other FEBS journals (FEBS Letters, The FEBS Journal, and Molecular Oncology) can be transferred to this journal with their original reviewer reports without the need to resubmit or reformat the manuscript.

== Abstracting and indexing ==
The journal is abstracted and indexed in:

- BIOSIS Previews
- Embase
- Scopus
- Science Citation Index Expanded

According to the Journal Citation Reports, the journal has a 2015 impact factor of 2.101, ranking it 197th out of 289 journals in the category "Biochemistry & Molecular Biology".
