= Kenneth Button (economist) =

British transport expert

Kenneth Button FAcSS
- Born: Kenneth John Button

Academic background
- Education: University of East Anglia; University of Leeds; Loughborough University

Academic work
- Discipline: Transport economics, applied economics
- Institutions: George Mason University; Loughborough University

Kenneth John Button (born 14 November 1948) is an economist and academic whose work has focused on applied economics, and especially transport policy, economic regulation, regional development, and environmental policy. He is University Professor Emeritus at George Mason University, where he was University Professor in the Schar School of Policy and Government from 1997 to 2023.

== Career ==
Button joined Loughborough University in 1971, serving in the Department of Economics as lecturer, senior lecturer and reader before becoming professor of applied economics and transport in 1989. He later directed the Centre for Research in European Economics and Finance at Loughborough.

Button held advisory roles with the Organisation for Economic Co-operation and Development in Paris, serving in the Environment Directorate in 1990 and later in the Secretary General's Advisory Unit from 1994 to 1996. He was also special adviser to the House of Commons Transport Committee in 1994.

In 1996, Button joined George Mason University, where he directed the Center for Transportation Policy, Operations and Logistics from 1996 to 2009 and the Aerospace Policy Research Center from 2003 to 2009. He was University Professor in the Schar School of Policy and Government from 1997 to 2023, becoming University Professor Emeritus in 2023.

Button has held academic positions as VSB Professor of Transport and the Environment at the Vrije Universiteit Amsterdam and MBP Professor in Economics at the National University of Singapore, as well as visiting appointments at the University of British Columbia, the University of California, Berkeley, the University of Bologna, the University of Porto, the European University Institute, and the University of Bergamo.

== Editorial and advisory work ==
Button was associate editor of Transportation Research Part A: Policy and Practice from 1989 to 1997. He was editor-in-chief of the Journal of Air Transport Management from 1997 to 2012 and the founding editor of Transportation Research Part D: Transport and Environment from 1996 to 2014. He was also associate editor of Annals of Tourism Research from 2005 to 2013.

Button has provided written or oral evidence and testimony to legislative and public bodies in the United Kingdom, the United States, and Canada. These include the House of Commons Transport Committee, the House of Lords Select Committee on Sustainable Development, the United States House Committee on Transportation and Infrastructure, the National Commission to Ensure Consumer Information and Choice in the Airline Industry, and the United States House Committee on Small Business.

== Published works ==
He is an author of texts, journals, and conference papers in the transport policy and economics field, and he is particularly well known for his work on road user charging, aviation, and environmental analysis. He has published over 80 books and 400 academic papers.

== Honours ==
Button is a Fellow of the Chartered Institute of Logistics and Transport, the Chartered Institution of Highways and Transportation, the Academy of Social Sciences, and the Royal Economic Society. In 2005, he received the Distinguished Transportation Researcher Award from the Transportation Research Forum. In 2011, he received the Distinguished Scholarship Award of the Transportation and Public Utilities Group of the American Economic Association. In 2014, he received the Herbert O. Whitten Service Award from the Transportation Research Forum. In 2015, he was named a Fellow of the Air Transport Research Society.

== Selected books ==
- Button, Kenneth (1977). The Economics of Urban Transport. Farnborough: Saxon House.
- Button, Kenneth; Pearman, A. D. (1981). The Economics of Urban Freight Transport. London: Macmillan.
- Button, Kenneth (1982). Transport Economics. London: Heinemann.
- Button, Kenneth (1984). Road Haulage Licensing and EC Transport Policy. Aldershot: Gower Press.
- Button, Kenneth; Pearman, A. D. (1985). Applied Transport Economics: A Practical Case Study Approach. London: Gordon and Breach.
- Button, Kenneth; Gillingwater, D. (1986). Future Transport Policy. London: Croom Helm.
- Button, Kenneth; Swann, D., eds. (1989). The Age of Regulatory Reform. Oxford: Oxford University Press.
- Button, Kenneth, ed. (1991). Airline Deregulation: An International Perspective. London: David Fulton.
- Button, Kenneth (1993). Transport, the Environment and Economic Policy. Cheltenham: Edward Elgar.
- Button, Kenneth; Haynes, K.; Stough, R. (1998). Flying into the Future: Air Transport Policy in the European Union. Cheltenham: Edward Elgar.
- Button, Kenneth; Stough, R. (2000). Air Transport Networks: Theory and Policy Implications. Cheltenham: Edward Elgar.
- Button, Kenneth; Hensher, D., eds. (2000). Handbook of Transport Modelling. Oxford: Pergamon.
- Button, Kenneth; Brewer, A.; Hensher, D., eds. (2001). Handbook of Logistics and Supply-Chain Management. Oxford: Pergamon.
- Button, Kenneth; Hensher, D., eds. (2003). Handbook of Transport and the Environment. Oxford: Pergamon.
- Button, Kenneth (2004). Wings Across Europe: Towards an Efficient European Air Transport System. Aldershot: Ashgate.
- Button, Kenneth; Hensher, D., eds. (2005). Handbook of Transport Strategy, Policy and Institutions. Oxford: Pergamon.
- Button, Kenneth (2010). Transport Economics (3rd ed.). Cheltenham: Edward Elgar.
- Button, Kenneth; Vega, H.; Nijkamp, P., eds. (2011). Dictionary of Transport Analysis. Cheltenham: Edward Elgar.
- Button, Kenneth (2016). The Economics and Political Economy of Transportation Security. Cheltenham: Edward Elgar.
- Button, Kenneth (2017). The Value of Applied Economics: The Life and Work of Arthur (A.J.) Brown. Cheltenham: Edward Elgar.
- Button, Kenneth; Finger, M., eds. (2017). Air Transport Liberalization: A Critical Assessment. Cheltenham: Edward Elgar.
- Button, Kenneth (2022). Transport Economics (4th ed.). Cheltenham: Edward Elgar.
- Button, Kenneth, ed. (2023). Airline Economics in Developing Economies. London: Emerald.
