= List of transportation and logistics journals =

List of academic journals in transportation and logistics

This is a list of transportation and logistics journals that are peer-reviewed, covering topics such as supply chain management, freight transport, marine transport, rail transport, intermodal freight transport, transport economics, urban mobility, and more.

== Transportation journals ==
- Transportation Science
- Transportation Research Part A: Policy and Practice
- Transportation Research Part B: Methodological
- Transportation Research Part C: Emerging Technologies
- Transportation Research Part D: Transport and Environment
- Transportation Research Part E: Logistics and Transportation Review
- Transportation (journal)
- Journal of Transport Geography
- Journal of Transportation Engineering
- Journal of Public Transportation
- Transportation Journal
- Transport Reviews
- Transport Policy
- EURO Journal on Transportation and Logistics
- European Transport Research Review
- World Review of Intermodal Transportation Research

== Logistics journals ==
- Journal of Business Logistics
- International Journal of Physical Distribution & Logistics Management
- Journal of Supply Chain Management
- Supply Chain Management: An International Journal

== See also ==
- List of economics journals
- Lists of academic journals
- Logistics automation
- Review of Maritime Transport
- Supply chain management
- Transportation engineering
- Transportation policy of the United States
- Transportation Research Board
- UC Irvine Institute of Transportation Studies
