= PEVA =

PEVA may refer to:

- Poly(ethylene-vinyl acetate)
- Performance Evaluation
- Pes equinovarus adductus or club foot
