= Birgit Vennesland =

Norwegian biochemist

- Born: 17 November 1913; Kristiansand
- Died: 15 October 2001 (aged 87)
- Education: doctorate
- Alma mater: University of Chicago
- Occupation: Biochemist; university teacher; researcher
- Awards: Garvan–Olin Medal (1964); honorary doctorate (1960, Mount Holyoke College)
- Academic career
- Institutions: University of Illinois College of Medicine; Harvard University; University of Chicago
- Doctoral students: Eric Conn

Birgit Vennesland (17 November 1913 — 15 October 2001) was a Norwegian-American biochemist. Vennesland spent the majority of her career as an academic for the University of Chicago from 1941 to 1968. While at Chicago, she compared the enzymes that animals use during metabolism to the enzymes used by plants in photosynthesis. After leaving Chicago for Germany, Vennesland was the director of the Max Planck Institute for Cell Biology from 1968 to 1970. She later was the director of an eponymous research facility by the Max Planck Society from 1970 until her retirement in 1981. During her career, Vennesland received the Stephen Hales Prize from the American Society of Plant Biologists in 1950 and the Garvan-Olin Medal from the American Chemical Society in 1964.

== Early life and education ==
On November 17, 1913, Vennesland was born in Kristiansand, Norway to Sigrid Kristine, a teacher, and Gunnuf Olaf, a timber merchant. For her first years, Vennesland grew up with her mother and twin sister in Norway, while her father immigrated to the United States. At the age of four, Vennesland and her family moved to the United States to live with her father in Chicago, Illinois. Vennesland received her undergraduate education at the University of Chicago on a scholarship. She graduated from Chicago with a Bachelor of Science in 1934 and a PhD in 1938, specializing in biochemistry.

== Career ==
While in college, Vennesland started her career with the University of Illinois Medical School as a research technician. After receiving her degrees, Vennesland worked at the University of Chicago for a year as a biochemist assistant before leaving for Harvard Medical School in 1939. Vennesland had planned to go to France for her career after she became an International Federation of University Women fellow. Due to World War II, Vennesland instead went to Harvard. Working as a research fellow at Harvard, Vennesland was part of a team that studied how carbon is transformed from carbon dioxide to glycogen. Vennesland returned to Chicago in 1941 and held multiple academic positions until 1968, ranging from instructor to professor.

Throughout this time period, Vennesland researched the enzymes animals use during metabolism and compared them to the enzymes plants use during photosynthesis. In 1953, Vennesland was a co-author of a publication about dehydrogenase called The Enzymatic Transfer of Hydrogen. She was also a co-author of a 1962 publication about the Hill reaction and carbon dioxide. During her tenure at Chicago, Vennesland also worked for the Office of Scientific Research and Development, United States Public Health Service and National Science Foundation.

Upon ending her career with Chicago, Vennesland emigrated to Germany to become the director for the Max Planck Institute for Cell Biology in 1968. There, Vennesland researched the effects of nitrate on chlorophyll. Vennesland continued working with the Max Planck Society as the director of the Vennesland Research Institute from 1970 to 1981. After her retirement in 1981, Vennesland became an adjunct professor for the University of Hawaii in 1987, teaching biophysics and biochemistry.

== Awards and honors ==
In 1950, Vennesland was the recipient of the Stephen Hales Prize from the American Society of Plant Biologists for her work in plant biochemistry. Years later, she received the Garvan-Olin Medal from the American Chemical Society in 1964.

== Death ==
On 15 October 2001, Vennesland died in Kaneohe, Hawaii.
