= Hans-Georg Schweiger =

German cell biologist (1927–1986)

Hans-Georg Schweiger (August 21, 1927 in Königsberg, Prussia – November 15, 1986 in Wilhelmsfeld) was a German cell biologist and a former director of the Max Planck Institute for Cell Biology.

== Education and career ==
Schweiger grew up in Königsberg. After serving in the Reich Labor Service for military service, being a prisoner of war in the United States and working as an assistant teacher, Schweiger began studying chemistry at the Humboldt University of Berlin in 1947. After his preliminary studies, he switched to medicine, where he passed the state examination in 1953. In 1955, Schweiger received his doctorate from the University of Hamburg with a thesis on glucose absorption in the intestinal mucosa.

After completing his doctorate, Schweiger worked at the Institute for Biochemistry at the Humboldt University of Berlin. In 1958 he moved to the Max Planck Institute for Marine Biology (since 1968 the Max Planck Institute for Cell Biology) in Wilhelmshaven, where he worked in the group of Joachim Hämmerling. In 1969, Schweiger was appointed director of the Max Planck Institute for Cell Biology. Under his direction, the institute moved to Ladenburg near Heidelberg in 1977.

Schweiger worked intensively on the interaction of the cell nucleus with the cytoplasm and in particular with the chloroplasts - this enabled him to demonstrate the transfer of chloroplast genes to the cell nucleus.

Schweiger was a founding member of the German Society for Cell Biology and its President from 1979 to 1981. From 1985 until his death, Schweiger was Editor-in-Chief of the European Journal of Cell Biology.
