= Kay Axhausen =

Swiss university teacher

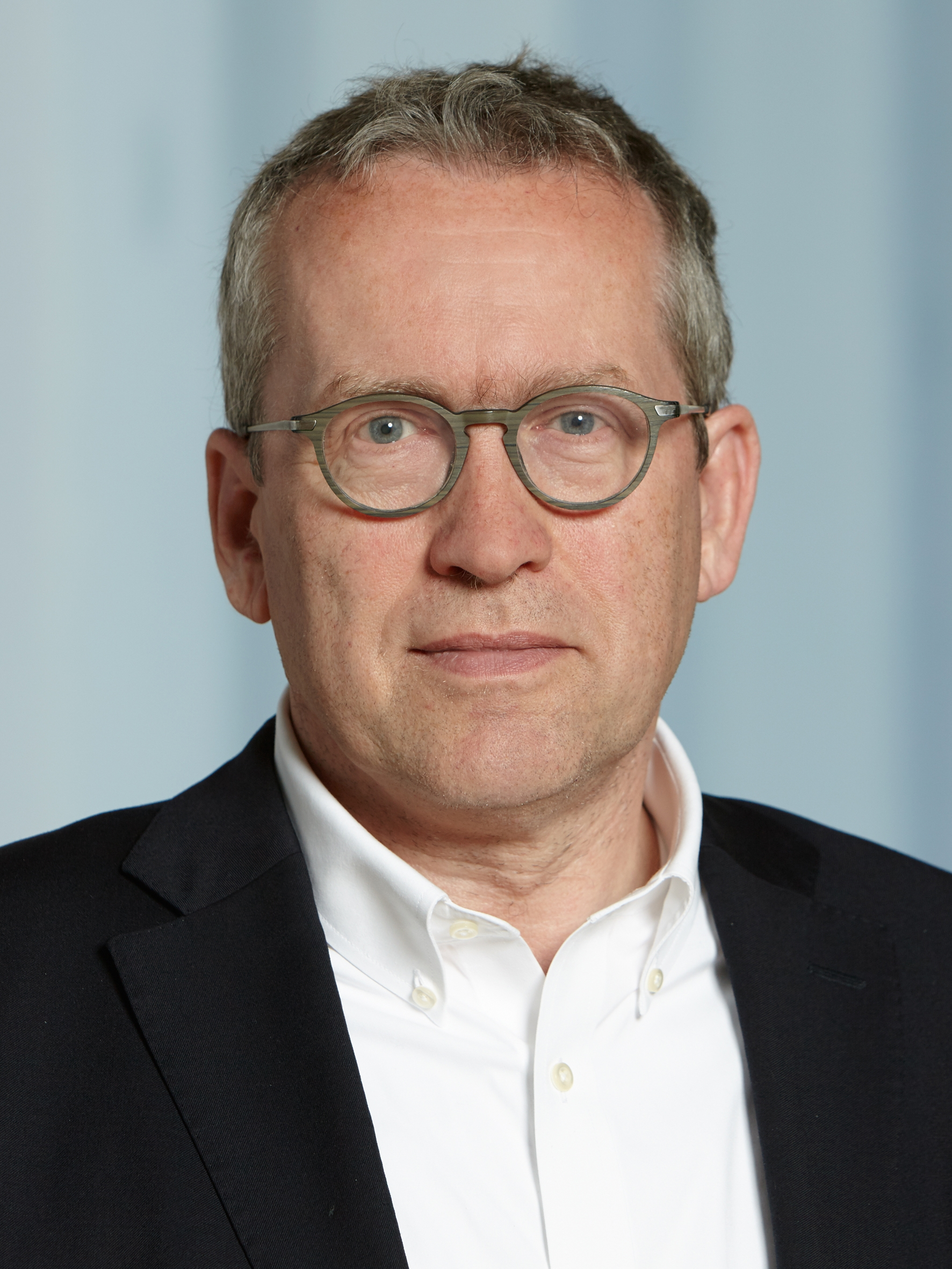
Kay Axhausen

Kay W. Axhausen (born 8 October 1958) was Professor and chair of transportation planning at the ETH Zurich, where he leads its Institute for Transport Planning and Systems. Before working at ETH, he worked at the University of Innsbruck, the Imperial College London and the University of Oxford. He holds Master of Science degree in civil and environmental engineering from the University of Wisconsin–Madison as well as Ph.D. in civil engineering from Karlsruhe Institute of Technology.

== Research ==
In 2013 he studied Singaporean bus lines and how often do people commute on the same bus. It is possible that the study will be used to predict the spread of diseases in urban areas.

In 2017 he published a study in which he said that according to the data, women are less likely to find a new job opportunity in comparison to men and the same year published another study in which he studied traffic jams in Switzerland. During that study he said that according to Zurich University of Technology data it showed that when a person changes a job, the journey from home to work becomes even longer.

== Publications and research data ==
Axhausen is known for writing several hundreds of papers, presentations and research data.

Axhausen is an editor in chief of Transportation, and serves on the editor's advisory board of Transportation Research A, and Travel Behaviour and Society.
