= William E. Fruhan Jr. =

American academic

- Education: Yale University; Harvard Business School
- Occupation: Academic

William E. Fruhan Jr. is an American academic. He is the George E. Bates Professor Emeritus at the Harvard Business School. He is the author of three books and over 140 business cases.

== Early life ==
William E. Fruhan Jr. graduated from Yale University, where he earned a Bachelor of Science degree. He earned a master in business administration (MBA) and a doctorate in business administration (DBA) from the Harvard Business School.

== Career ==
Fruhan is the George E. Bates Professor Emeritus at the Harvard Business School. He is the author of three books and the editor of Case Problems in Finance. He is also the author of many academic articles, and over 140 business cases.

In his first book, The Fight for Competitive Advantage, Fruhan analyzes ways to gain competitive advantage in the highly regulated airline carrier industry by using tools from finance, economics and public policy. He finds that corporate management cannot influence the profitability of airline carriers due to regulations, although he suggests the frequency of flights may do so. In a review for the Transportation Journal, University of Illinois professor Hale Barlett calls it "an excellent study" and "recommended reading for those who wish to deepen their knowledge of the air carrier industry and how firms compete in this regulated industry." In another review for The Journal of Business, Ohio State University professor C.C. Barnekov Jr. concludes that "the book would have been greatly improved if the author had paid a bit more attention to the standard cartel theory rather than "monopolistic" or predatory competition hypotheses", although he admits it is "interesting and readable." Meanwhile, professor Robert L. Thornton of Florida State University wrote in The American Political Science Review that Fruhan's analysis includes an "important inconsistency" in the role played by the Civil Aeronautics Board, which regulates the industry; however, he admits that other researchers have reached the same conclusions.

In his second book, Financial Strategy, Studies In The Creation, Transfer And Destruction Of Shareholder Value, Fruhan looks at business cases of companies with high returns on investment. In a review for The Accounting Review, Villanova University professor says it is "interesting reading if you have entrepreneurial inclinations" and it would be "appropriate for upper-level undergraduates or MBAs."

In his third book, Revitalizing Businesses: Shareholder/Work Force Conflicts, Furhan analyzes ways to restore profitability to a company by improving the relations between the shareholders and the workers.

In 2010, Fruhan was Harvard's highest paid faculty member, earning "$1,182,420, including $720,000 of retirement incentives."

== Works ==
- Fruhan, William E. Jr. (1972). The Fight for Competitive Advantage. Boston, Massachusetts: Harvard University Press. ISBN 9780875840970. OCLC 300168997.
- Fruhan, William E. Jr. (1979). Financial Strategy: Studies in the Creation, Transfer and Destruction of Shareholder Value. Homewood, Illinois: R. D. Irwin. OCLC 878176877.
- Fruhan, William E. Jr. (1985). Revitalizing Businesses: Shareholder/Work Force Conflicts. Boston, Massachusetts: Harvard University Press. ISBN 9780875841687. OCLC 11468648.
