= Seamus Martin =

Seamus Martin may refer to:

- Seamus Martin (journalist)
- Seamus Martin (biochemist)
