= BMCL =

BMCL may refer to:

- Bangkok Metro Company Limited
- Bioorganic & Medicinal Chemistry Letters
