= Mutation research =

Mutation research may refer to:

- Study of mutation, part of genetics
- Mutation Research (journal), a scientific journal
