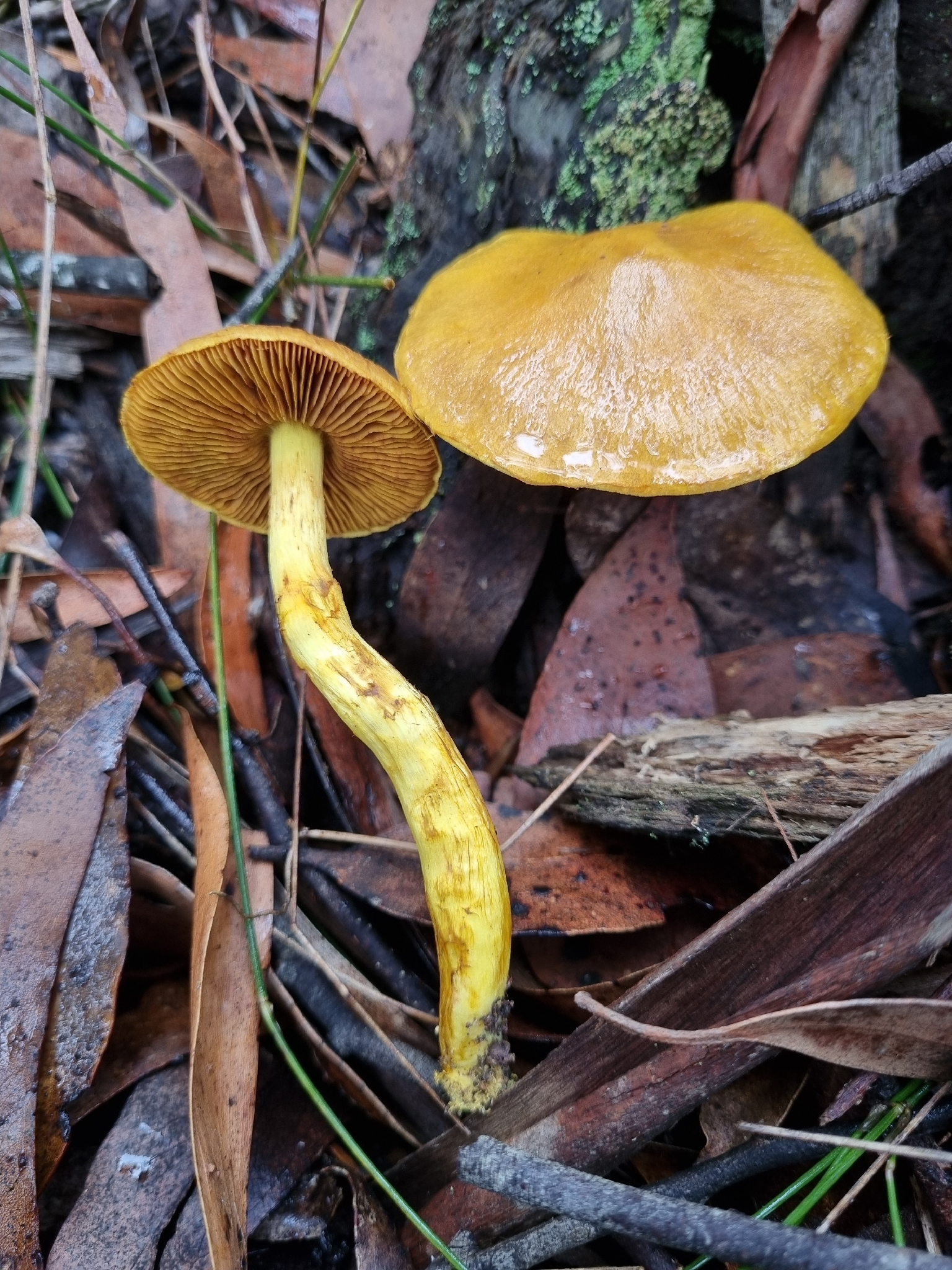
- C. canarius in Eucalyptus leaf litter

Scientific classification
- Kingdom: Fungi
- Division: Basidiomycota
- Class: Agaricomycetes
- Order: Agaricales
- Family: Cortinariaceae
- Genus: Cortinarius
- Species: C. canarius

Binomial name
- Cortinarius canarius (E.Horak) G.Garnier (1991)

Synonyms
- Dermocybe canaria E.Horak (1988)

= Cortinarius canarius =

Species of fungus

Cortinarius canarius
- Mycological characteristics
- Gills on hymenium
- Cap is convex or umbonate
- Hymenium is emarginate or decurrent
- Stipe has a ring or has a cortina
- Spore print is yellow to brown
- Ecology is mycorrhizal
- Edibility is unknown

Cortinarius canarius, commonly known as the canary webcap and the yellow skinhead, is a species of mushroom of the family Cortinariaceae. It was first described by the mycologist Egon Horak in 1988. The fungus is ectomycorrhizal, meaning it has symbiotic relationships with plants. C. canarius is present in Australia and New Zealand, where it grows on soil under various plants, such as Eucalyptus and Nothofagus. Fruiting primarily occurs from March to June, and the fruiting bodies are noted for their vibrant yellow colour.

== Taxonomy ==
Cortinarius canarius was first described by the mycologist Egon Horak in 1988 as Dermocybe canaria. The species was then transferred into the genus Cortinarius in 1991. C. canarius is categorised in the subgenus Leprocybe. C. canarius is commonly known as the canary webcap and the yellow skinhead.

== Description ==
The fruit bodies (basidiocarps) have caps (pilei) which can reach 60–80 millimetres (2.4–3.1 inches) wide. They can vary in shape, becoming convex when mature, with the centre being broadly umbonate to campanulate or flat and expanded. The caps are noted for their brilliant yellow to canary yellow colour, becoming yellow-brown with age, particularly towards the centre. The surface is finely to coarsely fibrous or slightly scaly when dry. In young specimens, the margin is covered with remnants of a fibrous veil. The gills (lamellae) are a golden yellow colour, turning mustard yellow then brown-yellow. The gills are crowded, emarginate, but can sometimes be decurrent. The stipes are yellow, becoming yellow-brown in older specimens, and have fusoid to bulbous root-like bases, and are rarely cylindrical. It has a veil below the cortina. The stipe is initially solid but becomes hollow. The taste of the mushroom is bitter, but the smell is non-distinctive.

The spore print is a rusty yellow to brown colour. The spores usually measure 7.5–8.5 × 4–5 µm. The spores are egg-shaped, mostly smooth when immature, and have a thin wall. The basidia measure 20–35 × 6–8 µm. The hyphae of the pileipellis measure 5–10 µm in diameter. The yellow colour of the fruiting bodies is attributed to several pigments, mainly physcion.

== Distribution and habitat ==
The species is native to Australia and New Zealand. In Australia, it is found in Tasmania and Victoria. In New Zealand, it is more common. In the North Island it is found in the Auckland Region, Waikato, the Manawatū-Whanganui and Wellington Region. It is found throughout the South Island. Fruiting bodies of C. canarius grows in leaf litter or peat moss on soil. They typically fruit from March to June. The fungus is ectomycorrhizal, meaning it has symbiotic relationships with plants, such as, Eucalyptus, Nothofagus, and rarely Leptospermum. Its habitat in New Zealand commonly includes conifers, such as Libocedrus bidwillii and Phyllocladus alpinus.

== Works cited ==
Books

- Sisson, Liv (2023). Fungi of Aotearoa: A Curious Forager's Field Guide. Auckland, New Zealand: Penguin Books. ISBN 978-1-76104-787-9.
- Sridhar, Kandikere R.; Deshmukh, Sunil K. (2021). Advances in Macrofungi: Industrial Avenues and Prospects. CRC Press. ISBN 978-1-000-46012-4.

Journals

- Gates, Genevieve M.; Mohammed, Caroline; Ratkowsky, David A.; Wardlaw, Tim; Davidson, Neil J. (2011). "Diversity and Ecology of Epigeous Ectomycorrhizal Macrofungal Assemblages in a Native Wet Eucalypt Forest in Tasmania, Australia". Fungal Ecology. 4 (4). Elsevier BV: 290–298. doi:10.1016/j.funeco.2011.02.002.
- Fiala, Johannes; Battlogg, Marion; Bösking, Julian; Buchauer, Katharina; May, Tom W.; Pannwitz, Andrea; Peintner, Ursula; Siewert, Bianka (2025). "Photoantimicrobial Anthraquinones in Australian Fungi of the Genus Cortinarius". Fitoterapia. 182 106402. Elsevier BV. doi:10.1016/j.fitote.2025.106402.
- Horak, E. (1991). "New species of Dermocybe (Agaricales) from New Zealand". Sydowia. 40: 81–112.
- Soop, Karl; Cooper, Jerry A.; Nilsen, Andy R.; Orlovich, David A. (2023). "Cortinarius Subgenus Leprocybe (Agaricales) in New Zealand". New Zealand Journal of Botany. 61 (4): 282–303. doi:10.1080/0028825X.2022.2129077.
- Stefani, Franck O.P.; Jones, Rodney H.; May, Tom W. (2014). "Concordance of Seven Gene Genealogies Compared to Phenotypic Data Reveals Multiple Cryptic Species in Australian Dermocyboid Cortinarius (Agaricales)". Molecular Phylogenetics and Evolution. 71: 249–260. doi:10.1016/j.ympev.2013.10.019.
- McKenzie, E. H. C.; Johnston, P. R.; Buchanan, P. K. (2006). "Checklist of Fungi on Teatree (Kunzea and Leptospermum species) in New Zealand". New Zealand Journal of Botany. 44 (3): 293–335. doi:10.1080/0028825X.2006.9513025.

Websites

- "Cortinarius canarius (E. Horak) G. Garnier, Bibliographie des Cortinaires, A-C (France): 106 (1991)". Index Fungorum. 2026.
- "Lost Agarics". Fungi Map. 2026. Archived from the original on 31 August 2025.
- "Victoria's Threatened List and Processes List" (PDF). Environment Victoria. 2026.
