= Kurt Julius Isselbacher =

German-born American physician (1925–2019)

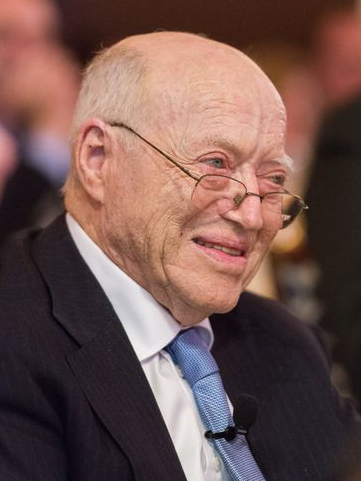
- Born: September 12, 1925; Wirges, Germany
- Died: July 18, 2019 (aged 93); Boston, Massachusetts, U.S.
- Education: Harvard College; Harvard Medical School
- Known for: Galactosemia; Liver disease Harrison's Principles of Internal Medicine; Gastrointestinal Unit at the Massachusetts General Hospital; Massachusetts General Hospital Cancer Center
- Spouse: Rhoda Solin Isselbacher (m. 1955–2015) (4 children)
- Awards: National Academy of Sciences; National Research Council; American Academy of Arts and Sciences; Institute of Medicine; American Gastroenterological Association; American Association for the Study of Liver Diseases; Association of American Physicians; Food and Drug Administration
- Scientific career
- Fields: Medicine; Oncology; Gastroenterology
- Workplaces: National Institutes of Health; Harvard Medical School; Massachusetts General Hospital

Kurt Julius Isselbacher (September 12, 1925 – July 18, 2019) was a German-born American physician and held the position of Mallinckrodt Distinguished Professor of Medicine at Harvard Medical School and director emeritus of the Massachusetts General Hospital Cancer Center.

== Early life ==
Isselbacher was born in Wirges, Germany, to Flori (Strauss), a homemaker, and Albert Isselbacher, a merchant. His family was Jewish. After suffering atrocities from the Nazis, they emigrated and took up residence in Portsmouth, New Hampshire.

== Education ==
After graduating high school in Portsmouth, Isselbacher attended Harvard College and then graduated from Harvard Medical School cum laude in 1950. After completing his residency in medicine at the Massachusetts General Hospital (MGH) in 1953, he became a clinical and research fellow at the National Institutes of Health (NIH).

== Career ==
In 1956, Isselbacher returned to MGH and Harvard and remained there for the remainder of his professional career. He also held the position of the Mallinckrodt Distinguished Professor of Medicine at Harvard Medical School and director emeritus of the Massachusetts General Hospital Cancer Center. He was elected to the National Academy of Sciences in 1973.

=== Academic and scholarly activities ===
In 1953, while still a medical resident he published work supporting the association of asbestos exposure and cancer of the lung. While at the NIH, he discovered the enzymatic defect causing the hereditary disorder of galactosemia. This work led to the development of a test for this disorder which is now being used in routine screening of newborns. In addition, he elucidated the enzymatic mechanism for the formation of glucuronide conjugates, important for the detoxification of many compounds by the liver.

After returning from the NIH in 1956, at the age of 31 he was chosen to head the Gastrointestinal Unit at the MGH. Over the subsequent 30 years, his division became one of the leading centers of training, research and treatment of gastrointestinal diseases in the United States. His research during this period included the description and elucidation of a new hereditary disorder of leucine metabolism called isovaleric acidemia, the definition of enzymatic defects in absorptive disorders, delineations of biochemical mechanism of nutrient absorption, malabsorption, and protein synthesis, derangements of metabolism and immunologic aspects of hepatic gastrointestinal diseases.

In 1987, he undertook the challenge of becoming the first director of the Massachusetts General Hospital Cancer Center, and in a relatively short period of time that Center emerged as a "premier" cancer research institute." He became director emeritus in 2003. For almost 30 years, (1966-1995) he served as chairman of the executive committee of Harvard's Departments of Medicine and played a pivotal role in the departments' growth and quest for excellence. Dr. Isselbacher trained over 140 clinical and research fellows both in gastroenterology and oncology and many of them have become leaders in their respective fields nationally and internationally. His publications included close to 400 journal articles and book chapters.

He served on the editorial boards of Journal of Clinical Investigation (1962-1972) and Gastorenterology (1963-1968) and was also consulting editor of Medicine (1962-1994). His leadership in medicine was also recognized nationally and internationally by virtue of his role as an editor of Harrison's Principles of Internal Medicine. This book is viewed by many as the leading text in internal medicine. It is used worldwide and has been translated into 18 languages. Dr. Isselbacher was a member and officer in many professional associations, including the National Academy of Sciences (NAS), the National Research Council, the American Academy of Arts and Sciences, and the Institute of Medicine. He served as president of the American Gastroenterological Association, the American Association for Study of Liver Diseases, and the Association of American Physicians. He also served as a member of the Science Advisory Board of the Food and Drug Administration. Dr. Isselbacher received many awards and honors including the Distinguished Achievement Award and the Friedenwald Medal of the American Gastroenterological Association, the John Phillips Memorial Award for Distinguished Achievement in Clinical Medicine, and from Squibb/Mead Johnson the Award for Distinguished Achievement in Nutrition Research. In 2001, he received the Kober Medal of the Association of American Physicians, which is the highest recognition that this Association can bestow on one of its members and also an honorary Doctor of Science degree from Northwestern University.

== Publications ==
Isselbacher's memoir, Don't Call Me Cookie, was first published in 2008. Isselbacher published a second edition in 2012 that outlined his research endeavors in greater detail. The second edition of Don't Call Me Cookie was released as an e-book in 2019.

Isselbacher authored over 470 publications throughout his career as a physician-scientist and researcher.

== Personal life ==
Kurt Isselbacher resided in Newton, MA and spent his summers in Woods Hole, MA, where he conducted research and subsequently served as a trustee for the Marine Biological Laboratory. Isselbacher was married for 60 years to Rhoda Solin Isselbacher who died on November 6, 2015. He is survived by three children, eight grandchildren, and two great-grandchildren. His eldest daughter died in 1997.
