= Mega journal =

Peer-reviewed academic open access journal

A mega journal (also mega-journal and megajournal) is a peer-reviewed academic open access journal designed to be much larger than a traditional journal by exercising low selectivity among accepted articles. It was pioneered by PLOS ONE. This "very lucrative publishing model" was soon emulated by other publishers.

== Definition ==
A mega journal has the following defining characteristics:

- broad coverage of different subject areas;
- accepting articles for publication based on whether they are technically sound rather than selecting for perceived importance; and
- using article processing charges to cover the costs of publishing, although it is also possible for a mega journal to function as a non-profit (one example is Open Library of Humanities).

Other less universal characteristics are

- "an accelerated review and publication process", "fast turnaround time";
- "academic editors", even "a large editorial board of academic editors", (instead of professional editors); and
- value-added services such as reusable graphics and data through Creative Commons licenses.

Mega journals are also online-only, with no printed version, and are fully open access, in contrast to hybrid open access journals. Some "predatory" open access publishers use the mega journal model.

== Influence ==
It has been suggested that the academic journal landscape might become dominated by a few mega journals in the future, at least in terms of total number of articles published. Mega journals shift the publishing industry's funding standard from the subscription-based model common to traditional closed access publications to article processing charges. Their business model may not motivate reviewers, who donate their time to "influence their field, gain exposure to the most current cutting edge research or list their service to a prestigious journal on their CVs." Finally, they may no longer serve as "fora for the exchange ... among colleagues in a particular field or sub-field", as traditionally happened in scholarly journals. To counter that indiscrimination, PLOS ONE, the prototypical megajournal, has started to "package relevant articles into subject-specific collections."

== List of mega journals ==
- PLOS ONE
- ACS Omega
- Scientific Reports
- SAGE Open
- Royal Society Open Science (Note: Self-declared:)
- BMJ Open
- PeerJ
- Medicine (Lippincott Williams & Wilkins journal)
- Biology Open
- IEEE Access (Note: Self-declared:)
- FEBS Open Bio
- AIP Advances
- G3: Genes, Genomes, Genetics
- Open Library of Humanities (Note: Self-declared:)
- De Gruyter Open imprint (Note: Self-declared:)
- Heliyon (Elsevier) (Note: Self-declared:)
- IET The Journal of Engineering (Note: Self-declared:)
