= Best Practice & Research: Clinical Rheumatology =

- Discipline: Rheumatology
- Language: English
- Edited by: Atul Deodhar

Publication details
- Former name(s): Baillière's Clinical Rheumatology
- History: 1987–present
- Publisher: Elsevier (England)
- Frequency: Bimonthly
- Impact factor: 2.727 (2019)

Standard abbreviations
- ISO 4: Best Pract. Res.: Clin. Rheumatol.
- NLM: Best Pract Res Clin Rheumatol

Indexing
- ISSN: 1521-6942 (print); 1532-1770 (web)
- LCCN: 2001252125
- OCLC no.: 47257348

Links
- Journal homepage; Online access

Best Practice & Research: Clinical Rheumatology is a medical journal covering evidence-based medicine as applied to clinical practice of musculoskeletal conditions. It is aimed at clinical physicians and trainees, to help them keep up to date with current practice. Issues contain review articles with a practical bent.

== Publication history ==
- Clinics in Rheumatic Diseases ISSN 0307-742X, published from 1975 to 1986 by W. B. Saunders, split into:
  - Baillière's Clinical Rheumatology ISSN 0950-3579, published from 1987 to 1998
  - Rheumatic Disease Clinics of North America
- Baillière's Best Practice & Research. Clinical Rheumatology, published 1999 to 2000 by Baillière Tindall
