= Wear (journal) =

- Discipline: Physics, chemistry, materials science
- Language: English
- Edited by: M. Papini, A. Fischer

Publication details
- Publisher: Elsevier
- Impact factor: 3.892 (2020)

Standard abbreviations
- ISO 4: Wear

Indexing
- ISSN: 0043-1648

Links
- Journal homepage

Wear is a scientific journal publishing papers on wear and friction. The papers may fall within the subjects of physics, chemistry, material science or mechanical engineering. It is published by Elsevier.

== See also ==
- List of periodicals published by Elsevier
