= Applied Geochemistry =

- Discipline: Geochemistry
- Language: English
- Edited by: Chen Zhu and Elisa Sacchi

Publication details
- History: 1986–present
- Publisher: Elsevier on behalf of the International Association of GeoChemistry
- Frequency: Monthly
- Open access: Hybrid
- Impact factor: 3.4 (2024)

Standard abbreviations
- ISO 4: Appl. Geochem.

Indexing
- CODEN: APPGEY
- ISSN: 0883-2927 (print); 1872-9134 (web)
- LCCN: 86643980
- OCLC no.: 164814949

Links
- Journal homepage; Online archive

Applied Geochemistry is a monthly peer-reviewed scientific journal published by Elsevier on behalf of the International Association of GeoChemistry. It covers research on environmental and regional geochemistry and was established in 1986. It is published by Elsevier and from 2012 to 2022 the editor-in-chief was Michael Kersten. He was succeeded by Zimeng Wang in 2023. Elisa Sacchi started as a co-Editor-in-Chief in 2025, and Chen Zhu succeeded Zimeng Wang in July 2026.

== History ==
Applied Geochemistry was established in 1986 as the official peer-reviewed journal of the International Association of GeoChemistry (IAGC). The journal was co-founded by Alfred A. Levinson, who served as Chairman of the IAGC Publications Committee, and Brian Hitchon, who served as its inaugural Executive Editor.

The creation of the journal reflected a strategic shift within the IAGC toward practical research applications in environmental protection, hydrogeochemistry, and resource exploration. Originally published bimonthly with six issues per volume, the journal transitioned to a monthly publication schedule under Elsevier as its scope expanded.

== Abstracting and indexing ==
The journal is abstracted and indexed in:

- CAB Abstracts
- Chemical Abstracts Service
- Current Contents/Physical, Chemical & Earth Sciences
- EBSCO databases
- Ei Compendex
- GEOBASE
- Science Citation Index Expanded
- Scopus

According to the Journal Citation Reports, the journal has a 2024 impact factor of 3.4.
