= Optical Fiber Technology =

Academic journal

- Discipline: Optics
- Language: English
- Edited by: Stefan Wabnitz

Publication details
- History: 1994–present
- Publisher: Elsevier
- Impact factor: 2.53 (2020)

Standard abbreviations
- ISO 4: Opt. Fiber Technol.

Indexing
- ISSN: 1068-5200

Links
- Journal homepage

Optical Fiber Technology is a scientific journal that is published by Elsevier (formerly by Academic Press). Established in 1994, it covers various topics in fiber-optic engineering, optical communications and fiber lasers.

== See also ==
- List of periodicals published by Elsevier
