= Federation of European Biochemical Societies =

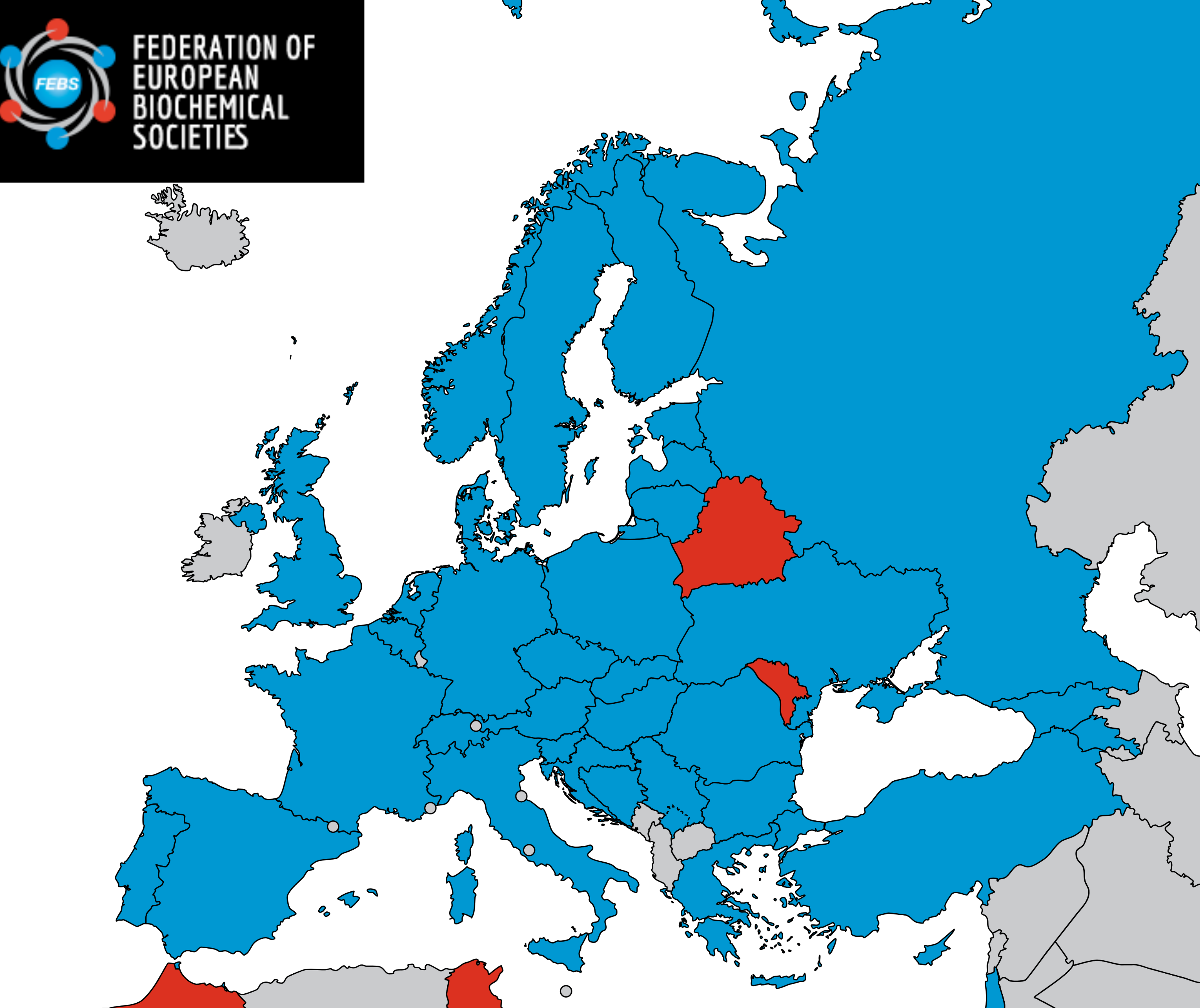
- Formation: 1 January 1964,
- Members: 35,000
- Website: www.febs.org

The Federation of the European Biochemical Societies (FEBS) is an international scientific society promoting activities in biochemistry, molecular biology and related research areas in Europe and neighbouring regions. It was founded in 1964 and includes over 35,000 members across 39 Constituent Societies.

== Present activities ==
FEBS activities include: publishing journals; providing grants for scientific meetings such as an annual Congress, Young Scientists' Forum and FEBS Advanced Courses; offering travel awards to early-stage scientists to participate in these events; offering research Fellowships for pre- and post-doctoral bioscientists; promoting molecular life science education; encouraging integration of scientists working in economically disadvantaged countries of the FEBS area; and awarding prizes and medals for research excellence. FEBS collaborates with related scientific societies such as its Constituent Societies, the International Union of Biochemistry and Molecular Biology (IUBMB) and the European Molecular Biology Organization (EMBO).

Awards presented by FEBS include the Sir Hans Krebs Medal, the FEBS/EMBO Women in Science Award (presented jointly with EMBO), the Datta medal and the Theodor Bücher medal.

== Journals ==
FEBS publishes four scientific journals: The FEBS Journal, FEBS Letters, Molecular Oncology and FEBS Open Bio. The FEBS Journal was previously entitled the European Journal of Biochemistry. Molecular Oncology and FEBS Open Bio are open-access journals.

== See also ==
- List of biochemistry awards
