= International Association of GeoChemistry =

- Abbreviation: IAGC
- Formation: 1967
- Type: INGO
- Region served: Worldwide
- Official language: English, French
- Parent organization: International Union of Geological Sciences (IUGS)
- Website: IAGC Official website

The IAGC (International Association of GeoChemistry, formerly known as the International Association of Geochemistry and Cosmochemistry) is affiliated with the International Union of Geological Sciences and has been one of the pre-eminent international geochemical organizations for over thirty-five years.

The principal objective of the IAGC is to foster co-operation in, and advancement of, geochemistry in the broadest sense. This is achieved by:

1. working with any interested group in planning symposia and other types of meetings related to geochemistry,
2. sponsoring publications in geochemistry of a type not normally covered by existing organizations and,
3. the activities of working groups which study problems that require, or would benefit from, international co-operation.

The scientific thrust of the IAGC takes place through its Working Groups (many of which organize regular symposia) and the official journal, Applied Geochemistry.

The specific objectives of the IAGC are:

1. To foster the use of the tools and techniques of chemistry to advance the understanding of the earth and its component systems for the benefit of mankind and modern society;
2. To contribute to advancement in geochemical research throughout the world, including both fundamental geochemical research aimed at understanding the global earth system and applied geochemical research that addresses problems of particular relevance to the welfare of mankind and society;
3. To promote international and education cooperation in geochemistry through outreach activities that include:
  - establishing internal specialty-area working groups in topic areas that would benefit from international scientific cooperation,
  - sponsoring international scientific meetings related to geochemistry,
  - disseminating new knowledge through publication of the journal “Applied Geochemistry,”
  - fostering communication in geochemistry across the international scientific community,
  - encouraging the early career development of young geochemists,
  - contributing to geochemical education,
  - enhancing the visibility of the science of geochemistry and demonstrating its importance to mankind and society.

== History ==
The International Association of Geochemistry and Cosmochemistry (IAGC) was formally founded on 8 May 1967. Prior to that time the organization of international geochemical affairs was largely carried out through the Inorganic Chemistry section of the International Union of Pure and Applied Chemistry (IUPAC) starting in 1960. It was at the twenty-first International Geological Congress (IGC) at Copenhagen in 1960 when the International Union of Geological Sciences (IUGS) was formally established and geochemists formed a close bond with the world geological community. Earl Ingerson, as Chairman or Secretary to three of the then existing international geochemical organizations, coordinated a meeting of members of the committees on geochemistry of the IGC, IUGG and IUPAC in New Delhi in 1964, but was himself unable to attend. This meeting, chaired by Ken Sugawara, drew up draft statutes and nominated temporary officers, with the result that in November 1965, Earl Ingerson called a meeting in Paris to name the association, complete the statutes, elect temporary officers and apply to IUGS for immediate affiliation. The first Council meeting was held on 8 May 1967 at UNESCO headquarters in Paris, presided over by Earl Ingerson.

Until 2000, the Association's governing body was the General Assembly which met during each IGC. The main internal financial support was provided by National Members who voted at the General Assembly. Some outside funding also came from UNESCO and IUGS Day-to-day operations between each General Assembly were carried out by a Council of five officers and eight Council members.

During its existence, IAGC has, through its various working groups and members, sponsored or co-sponsored more than 40 international meetings, which represent its main financial expenditure. Many of these meetings result from close cooperation with other associations affiliated with IUGS and IUGG, as well as various international, national, provincial and academic organizations. Proceedings of these meetings are usually published. In 1986 the IAGC launched its official journal, Applied Geochemistry.

At the General Assembly of the IAGC in Rio de Janeiro, National Memberships were terminated as it was widely felt that the IAGC was sufficiently mature and financially stable that the control and support of individual countries on the IAGC, through designated representatives (who may not have been geochemists), was redundant and potentially counter-productive. Thus, the IAGC evolved into a self-supported organization whose activities were controlled by its members, through an elected Executive and Council.

Recently, the Statutes of the IAGC have undergone important revisions to be more applicable to current plans and operations. Also, as described on the IAGC homepage, there has been a name change to reflect the applied geochemical nature of the IAGC (now the International Association of GeoChemistry).
