= Transportation (journal) =

Transportation: Planning - Policy - Research - Practice
- Discipline: Transportation
- Language: English
- Edited by: Kay Axhausen

Publication details
- History: 1972–present
- Publisher: Springer Science+Business Media
- Frequency: Bimonthly
- Impact factor: 3.3 (2024)

Standard abbreviations
- ISO 4: Transportation

Indexing
- ISSN: 0049-4488 (print); 1572-9435 (web)
- OCLC no.: 643846422

Links
- Journal homepage; Online access

Transportation is a peer-reviewed academic journal of research in transportation, published by Springer Science+Business Media. The journal focuses on issues of relevance to the formulation of policy, the preparation and evaluation of plans, and the day-to-day operations management of transport systems. It concerns itself with the policies and systems themselves, as well as with their impacts on and relationships with other aspects of the social, economic and physical environment. Its first issue was published in 1972.

== Abstracting and indexing ==
According to the Journal Citation Reports, it has a 2019 impact factor of 4.082, placing it 11th in the category "transportation science and technology". In a ranking of journals in all of economics produced as part of the Research Papers in Economics database, it was ranked 204th by impact factor and 195th by h-index.

== See also ==
- List of transportation and logistics journals
