= Journal of Heterocyclic Chemistry =

- Discipline: Organic chemistry
- Language: English
- Edited by: Lyle Castle

Publication details
- History: 1964–present
- Publisher: Wiley-Blackwell (United States)
- Frequency: Bimonthly
- Impact factor: 2.4 (2022)

Standard abbreviations
- ISO 4: J. Heterocycl. Chem.

Indexing
- CODEN: JHTCA
- ISSN: 0022-152X
- OCLC no.: 1783072

Links
- Journal homepage; Journal page at publisher's website; Online access

Journal of Heterocyclic Chemistry is a peer-reviewed scientific journal summarizing progress in the field of heterocycle chemistry. It is a source for the ChemSpider database.
