= Carl Neuberg =

German scientist (1877–1956)

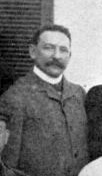
- Born: 29 July 1877; Hanover, Germany
- Died: 30 May 1956 (aged 78); New York City, United States
- Education: University of Würzburg, University of Berlin
- Known for: Theory for the alcoholic fermentation of glucose
- Spouse: Franziska Helene Lewinski
- Children: Two daughters: Irene Stephanie, Marianne
- Scientific career
- Fields: Biochemistry

Carl Alexander Neuberg (29 July 1877 – 30 May 1956) was an early pioneer in biochemistry, and he has sometimes been referred to as the "father of modern biochemistry". His notable contribution to science includes the discovery of the carboxylase and the elucidation of alcoholic fermentation which he showed to be a process of successive enzymatic steps, an understanding that became crucial as to how metabolic pathways would be investigated by later researchers.

== Personal life ==
Carl Sandel Neuberg was born on 29 July 1877 to a Jewish family in Hanover as the first child of Julius and Alma Neuberg. He was educated in the classical language gymnasium Lyceum I of the Ratsgymnasium until he was 15. In 1892 he moved with his parents to Berlin where he attended Friedrich-Werdersches Gymnasium. After graduating school in 1896, he studied astronomy, but soon switched to chemistry to comply with his father's wishes for him to become a master of brewery. He studied at the University of Würzburg and University of Berlin as well as Technischen Hochschule Charlottenburg.

On 21 May 1907, Neuberg married Franziska Helene (Hela) Lewinski, with whom he had two daughters, Irene Stephanie in 1908 and Marianne in 1911. His wife died from leukemia on 24 March 1929 at the age of 45. Neuberg was forced out of his job in 1934 under pressure from the Nazis. Just before the outbreak of the Second World War, he left Germany to work for a while at the University of Amsterdam, then travelled to Palestine via France during the war, eventually leaving in 1940 to move to the United States to join his daughters who had already settled there. He died on 30 May 1956 in New York after a prolonged illness.

== Career in science ==
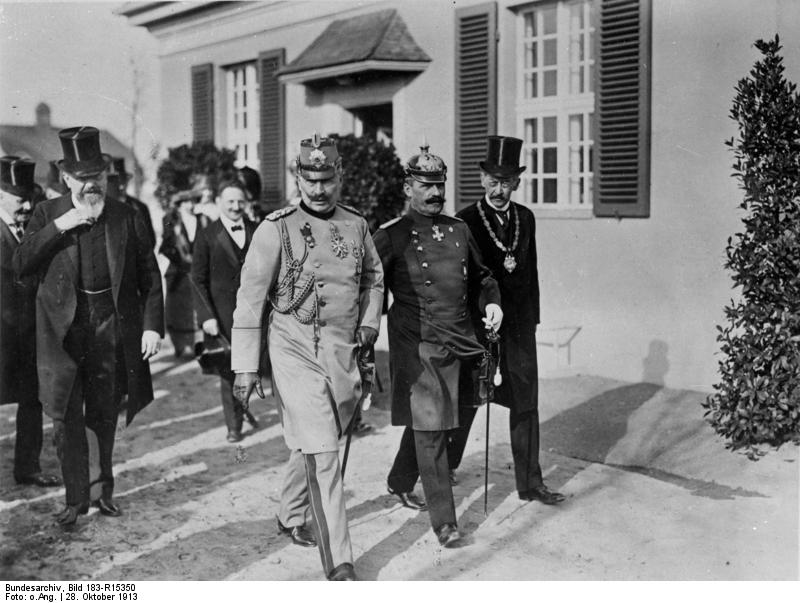
Carl Neuberg (fourth from right) walking in the background behind Kaiser Wilhem at the opening of the Kaiser Wilhelm Institute for Experimental Therapy in Dahlem in 1913.

Neuberg began his professional career working as an assistant in the physiological chemistry department of Charité in 1898 while he was still working on his doctoral thesis. He gained his PhD in 1900 working on the chemistry of glyceraldehyde under the supervision of Alfred Wohl at the University of Berlin. In 1903, Neuberg became a privatdozent, and in 1906 a professor at the University of Berlin.

Neuberg was the first editor of the journal Biochemische Zeitschrift that he founded in 1906, which became the European Journal of Biochemistry in 1967, and is now (since 2005) the FEBS Journal. In his early work in Germany, he worked on solubility and transport in cells, the chemistry of carbohydrates, photochemistry, as well as investigating and classifying different types of fermentation. He was also a pioneer in the study of the chemistry of amino acids and enzymes.

In 1913, Neuberg was invited to head the biochemistry section of the Kaiser Wilhelm Institute for Experimental Therapy, the director of which was August von Wasserman. In 1911 he discovered the enzyme pyruvate decarboxylase (EC 4.1.1.1, then called just "carboxylase") which catalyzes the decarboxylation of pyruvate to produce acetate. He also introduced methods for trapping of intermediate metabolites which allowed him to correctly interpret the steps and mechanisms of reactions, and formulate a theory for the alcoholic fermentation of glucose. Support for his theory was bolstered when he helped develop an industrial process that contributed materially to the German war effort in World War I, manufacturing glycerol—for the production of explosives—by the fermentation of sugar.

Neuberg made a particularly important discovery in 1916: hydrotropy, a solubilization process where the addition of large amounts of a second solute causes an increase in the aqueous solubility of a different solute. He also worked on catalase and the oxidation of fatty acids and amino acids, studied the structure of biochemicals, discovered other enzymes, and synthesized phosphorylated intermediates of carbohydrate metabolism. He is considered one of the founders and leaders of modern dynamic biochemistry.

Due to his Jewish origin, Neuberg was forced by the Nazis to end his work at the Kaiser Wilhelm Institute for Biochemistry in 1936 and he left Germany in 1937. The successor for his position at the Kaiser Wilhelm Institute for Biochemistry was Adolf Butenandt. Neuberg moved to the United States in 1940, however due to his age, he was unable to find a paid academic position, and he worked as a consultant for industry. Nevertheless, he was associated with a number of universities, and continued to work on enzymes and cell transport processes.

On 5 Nov 1947, he received a medal from the American Society of European Chemists and Pharmacists. He served as a professor at the Brooklyn Polytechnic Institute.

== See also ==
- Neuberg ester (fructose 6-phosphate)
