= Hydrotrope =

Chemical substance

A hydrotrope is a compound that solubilizes hydrophobic compounds in aqueous solutions by means other than micellar solubilization. Typically, hydrotropes consist of a hydrophilic part and a hydrophobic part (similar to surfactants), but the hydrophobic part is generally too small to cause spontaneous self-aggregation. Hydrotropes do not have a critical concentration above which self-aggregation spontaneously starts to occur (as found for micelle- and vesicle-forming surfactants, which have a critical micelle concentration (CMC) and a critical vesicle concentration (CVC)). Instead, some hydrotropes aggregate in a step-wise self-aggregation process, gradually increasing aggregation size. However, many hydrotropes do not seem to self-aggregate at all, unless a solubilizate has been added. Examples of hydrotropes include urea, tosylate, cumenesulfonate and xylenesulfonate.

The term hydrotropy was originally put forward by Carl Neuberg to describe the increase in the solubility of a solute by the addition of fairly high concentrations of alkali metal salts of various organic acids. However, the term has been used in the literature to designate non-micelle-forming substances, either liquids or solids, capable of solubilizing insoluble compounds.

The chemical structure of the conventional Neuberg's hydrotropic salts (proto-type, sodium benzoate) consists generally of two essential parts, an anionic group and a hydrophobic aromatic ring or ring system. The anionic group is involved in bringing about high aqueous solubility, which is a prerequisite for a hydrotropic substance. The type of anion or metal ion appeared to have a minor effect on the phenomenon. On the other hand, planarity of the hydrophobic part has been emphasized as an important factor in the mechanism of hydrotropic solubilization

To form a hydrotrope, an aromatic hydrocarbon solvent is sulfonated, creating an aromatic sulfonic acid. It is then neutralized with a base.

Additives may either increase or decrease the solubility of a solute in a given solvent. These salts that increase solubility are said to "salt in" the solute and those salts that decrease the solubility "salt out" the solute. The effect of an additive depends very much on the influence it has on the structure of water or its ability to compete with the solvent water molecules. A convenient quantitation of the effect of a solute additive on the solubility of another solute may be obtained by the Setschetow equation:

$$\log{\frac {S_0}{S}} = K \cdot C_a$$,

where

S_{0} is the solubility in the absence of the additive

S is the solubility in the presence of the additive

C_{a} is the concentration of the additive

K is the salting coefficient, which is a measure of the sensitivity of the activity coefficient of the solute towards the salt.

== Applications ==
Hydrotropes are in use industrially and commercially in cleaning and personal care product formulations to allow more concentrated formulations of surfactants. About 29,000 metric tons are produced (i.e., manufactured and imported) annually in the US. Annual production (plus importation) in Europe and Australia is approximately 17,000 and 1,100 metric tons, respectively.

Common products containing hydrotropes include laundry detergents, surface cleaners, dishwashing detergents, liquid soaps, shampoos and conditioners. They are coupling agents, used at concentrations from 0.1 to 15% to stabilize the formula, modify viscosity and cloud-point, reduce phase separation in low temperatures, and limit foaming.

Sodium xylene sulfonate, a commercial hydrotrope

Adenosine triphosphate, a proposed hydrotrope.

Examples of hydrotropes used for industrial and commercial purposes
Chemical	CAS#
Toluene sulfonic acid, Na salt	12068-03-0
Toluene sulfonic acid, K salt	16106-44-8 30526-22-8
Xylene sulfonic acid, Na salt	1300-72-7 827-21-4
Xylene sulfonic acid, ammonium salt	26447-10-9
Xylene sulfonic acid, K salt	30346-73-7
Xylene sulfonic acid, Ca salt	28088-63-3
Cumene sulfonic acid, Na salt	28348-53-0 32073-22-6
Cumene sulfonic acid, ammonium salt	37475-88-0

Adenosine triphosphate (ATP) has been shown to prevent aggregation of proteins at normal physiologic concentrations and to be approximately an order of magnitude more effective than sodium xylene sulfonate in a classic hydrotrope assay. The hydrotrope activity of ATP was shown to be independent of its activity as an "energy currency" in cells. Additionally, ATP function as biological hydrotope has been shown proteome-wide under near native conditions. In a recent study, however, the hydrotropic capabilities of ATP have been questioned as it has severe salting-out characteristics due to its triphosphate moiety.

== Environmental considerations ==
Hydrotropes have a low bioaccumulation potential, as the octanol-water partition coefficient is <1.0. Studies have found hydrotopes to be very slightly volatile, with vapor pressures <2.0x10-5 Pa. They are aerobically biodegradable. Removal via the secondary wastewater treatment process of activated sludge is >94%. Acute toxicity studies on fish show an LC50 >400 mg active ingredient (a.i.)/L. For Daphnia, the EC50 is >318 mg a.i./L. The most sensitive species is green algae with EC50 values in the range of 230–236 mg a.i./ L and No Observed Effect Concentrations (NOEC) in the range of 31–75 mg a.i./L. The aquatic Predicted No Effect Concentration (PNEC) was found to be 0.23 mg a.i./L. The Predicted Environmental Concentration (PEC)/PNEC ratio has been determined to be < 1 and, therefore, hydrotropes in household laundry and cleaning products have been determined to not be an environmental concern.

== Human health ==
Aggregate exposures to consumers (direct and indirect dermal contact, ingestion, and inhalation) have been estimated to be 1.42 ug/Kg bw/day. Calcium xylene sulfonate and sodium cumene sulfonate have been shown to cause temporary, slight eye irritation in animals. Studies have not found hydrotropes to be mutagenic, carcinogenic or have reproductive toxicity.
