= Journal of Nuclear Materials =

- Discipline: Nuclear engineering, materials science
- Language: English
- Edited by: Gary S. Was

Publication details
- History: 1959–present
- Publisher: Elsevier
- Frequency: Monthly
- Open access: Hybrid
- Impact factor: 2.936 (2020)

Standard abbreviations
- ISO 4: J. Nucl. Mater.

Indexing
- CODEN: JNUMAM
- ISSN: 0022-3115
- LCCN: 62030391
- OCLC no.: 39178747

Links
- Journal homepage; Online access

The Journal of Nuclear Materials is a monthly peer-reviewed scientific journal on materials research for accelerator physics, nuclear power generation and fuel cycle applications. It was established in 1959 and is published by Elsevier. The current editor-in-chief is Gary S. Was (University of Michigan).

== Abstracting and indexing ==
The journal is abstracted and indexed in:

- Chemical Abstracts Service
- Index Medicus/MEDLINE/PubMed
- Science Citation Index
- Current Contents/Physical, Chemical & Earth Sciences
- Current Contents/Engineering, Computing & Technology
- Scopus

According to the Journal Citation Reports, the journal has a 2020 impact factor of 2.936.
