= Energy Procedia =

- Discipline: Energy
- Language: English
- Edited by: Jinyue Yan

Publication details
- History: 2009-2019
- Publisher: Elsevier
- Frequency: Irregular

Standard abbreviations
- ISO 4: Energy Procedia

Indexing
- ISSN: 1876-6102

Links
- Journal homepage; Online access

Energy Procedia was a peer-reviewed scientific journal part of the Procedia series published by Elsevier. It was abstracted and indexed in EI-Compendex, Engineering Index, and Scopus. The journal published conference proceedings dealing with all aspects of industry research on energy. The journal stands discontinued as of 2019.
