= Lung Cancer (journal) =

- Discipline: Oncology
- Language: English
- Edited by: Rolf A. Stahel

Publication details
- History: 1985-present
- Publisher: Elsevier
- Frequency: Monthly
- Open access: Optional
- Impact factor: 5.705 (2020)

Standard abbreviations
- ISO 4: Lung Cancer

Indexing
- ISSN: 0169-5002 (print); 1872-8332 (web)
- OCLC no.: 13919021

Links
- Journal homepage; Online access

Lung Cancer is a peer-reviewed medical journal published by Elsevier originally published on behalf of the International Association for the Study of Lung Cancer (until 2006). As of 2015, it is published on behalf of the International Lung Cancer Consortium, the European Thoracic Oncology Platform, and the British Thoracic Oncology Group. It includes original research and review articles of relevance to lung cancer.

== Abstracting and indexing ==
The journal is abstracted and indexed in Current Contents/Clinical Medicine, EMBASE, BIOBASE, MEDLINE, Oncology Information Service, SciSearch, and Scopus. According to the Journal Citation Reports, Lung Cancer has a 2020 impact factor of 5.705, ranking it 13th out of 64 in the category Respiratory System.
