= Cancer Epidemiology (journal) =

- Discipline: Medicine
- Language: English

Publication details
- Publisher: Elsevier
- Frequency: Bimonthly
- Impact factor: 2.984 (2020)

Standard abbreviations
- ISO 4: Cancer Epidemiol.

Indexing
- ISSN: 1877-7821

Links
- Journal homepage

Cancer Epidemiology (formerly known as Cancer Detection & Prevention) is a peer reviewed journal devoted to epidemiological cancer research. According to the Journal Citation Reports, the journal has a 2020 impact factor of 2.984.

== Editor-in-Chief ==
- Eve Roman (University of York)
