= DNA Repair (journal) =

- Discipline: DNA repair, cell biology
- Language: English

Publication details
- Former name(s): Mutation Research/DNA Repair; Mutation Research/DNA Repair Reports
- History: 2002–present
- Publisher: Elsevier
- Frequency: Monthly
- Impact factor: 2.5 (2024)

Standard abbreviations
- ISO 4: DNA Repair

Indexing
- ISSN: 1568-7864 (print); 1568-7856 (web)
- OCLC no.: 48953587

Links
- Journal homepage; Online access

DNA Repair is a peer-reviewed scientific journal that covers cellular responses to DNA damage. Published monthly since January 2002 by Elsevier as the continuation of Mutation Research/DNA Repair, with Samuel H. Wilson as editor in chief. The journal publishes original research papers, short reviews, and book reviews concerning DNA repair, cell cycle regulation, cell death, and other biological responses to genetic damage.

According to the Journal Citation Reports, its 2024 impact factor is 2.5.
