= Rheumatic Disease Clinics of North America =

- Discipline: Rheumatology
- Language: English
- Edited by: Michael H. Weisman

Publication details
- History: 1987–present
- Publisher: W.B. Saunders, Elsevier (United States)
- Impact factor: 2.67 (2020)

Standard abbreviations
- ISO 4: Rheum. Dis. Clin. N. Am.

Indexing
- CODEN: RDCAEK
- ISSN: 1558-3163 (print); 0889-857X (web)
- LCCN: 87640478
- OCLC no.: 14091867

Links
- Journal homepage

Rheumatic Disease Clinics of North America is a medical journal addressing topics in rheumatology.

== See also ==
- Best Practice & Research: Clinical Rheumatology
