= International Journal of Greenhouse Gas Control =

- Discipline: Energy and fuel, Environmental science, Climate change
- Language: English
- Edited by: Professor Samuel Krevor

Publication details
- History: 2007–present
- Publisher: Elsevier
- Frequency: Monthly

Standard abbreviations
- ISO 4: Int. J. Greenh. Gas Control

Indexing
- ISSN: 1750-5836

Links
- Journal homepage

The International Journal of Greenhouse Gas Control is a monthly scientific journal covering industry research on greenhouse gas control through carbon capture and storage at large stationary emitters in the power sector and in other major resource, manufacturing and production industries.

It is peer-reviewed and published by Elsevier. As of 2025, the editor-in-chief is Professor Samuel Krevor, Imperial College London. The founding editor was John J Gale, employed by the International Energy Agency Greenhouse Gas Research and Development Programme, Cheltenham, United Kingdom. It was started in 2007 by contributors to the IPCC Special Report on Carbon Capture and Storage who identified the importance of having a peer-reviewed scientific journal to report on developments in carbon capture and storage.

According to the Journal Citation Reports in 2025, the journal had a 2024 impact factor of 5.2. It began as a quarterly publication in 2007, moved to publications every second month in 2009, and in 2014 it began to publish monthly issues.
