= Advances in Ecological Research =

Scientific journal

- Discipline: Ecology
- Language: English
- Edited by: David A. Bohan, Alex J. Dumbrell

Publication details
- History: 1962-present
- Publisher: Academic Press
- Frequency: Biannual
- Impact factor: 5.182 (2021)

Standard abbreviations
- ISO 4: Adv. Ecol. Res.

Indexing
- CODEN: AELRAY
- ISSN: 0065-2504 (print); 2163-582X (web)
- LCCN: 62021479
- OCLC no.: 1220531

Links
- Journal homepage; Online archive

Advances in Ecological Research is a peer-reviewed scientific journal that was established in 1962 and is published by Academic Press. It was originally published every two years, but began to be published annually starting with the fourth volume. As of 2004, two volumes are published per year. The first editor-in-chief was J. B. Cragg, while the current editors are David A. Bohan and Alex J. Dumbrell. Past editors include Guy Woodward. The journal covers all aspects of ecology.

== Abstracting and indexing ==
The journal is abstracted and indexed in the Science Citation Index, The Zoological Record, and BIOSIS Previews. According to the Journal Citation Reports, the journal has a 2021 impact factor of 5.182.
