= European Journal of Integrative Medicine =

- Discipline: Integrative medicine
- Language: English
- Edited by: Nicola Robinson

Publication details
- History: 2009-present
- Publisher: Elsevier
- Frequency: Quarterly
- Impact factor: 1.314 (2020)

Standard abbreviations
- ISO 4: Eur. J. Integr. Med.

Indexing
- ISSN: 1876-3820 (print); 1876-3839 (web)
- LCCN: 2010243439
- OCLC no.: 874531553

Links
- Journal homepage; Online archive

The European Journal of Integrative Medicine is a quarterly peer-reviewed medical journal covering integrative and alternative medicine. It was established in 2009 and is published by Elsevier. The editor-in-chief is Nicola Robinson (London South Bank University). According to the Journal Citation Reports, the journal has a 2020 impact factor of 1.314.
