= Transportation Research Part E =

Academic journal

Transportation Research Part E: Logistics and Transportation Review
- Discipline: Transportation, Logistics
- Language: English
- Edited by: Reza Zanjirani Farahani, Hans Wang

Publication details
- History: 1997-present
- Publisher: Elsevier
- Frequency: Monthly
- Open access: Hybrid
- Impact factor: 10.6 (2022)

Standard abbreviations
- ISO 4: Transp. Res. E

Indexing
- ISSN: 1878-5794

Links
- Journal homepage; Online archive

Transportation Research Part E: Logistics and Transportation Review is a monthly peer-reviewed academic journal which publishes information and articles about logistics and transportation research. It was established in 1997 and is published by Elsevier. The editors-in-chief are Reza Zanjirani Farahani (Paris School of Business) and Hans Wang (The Hong Kong Polytechnic University). It is ranked as a top journal in the Australian ABDC business school journal list (A*). According to the Journal Citation Reports, the journal has a 2022 impact factor of 10.6.

== See also ==
- Transportation Research Part A: Policy and Practice
- Transportation Research Part D: Transport and Environment
- List of transportation and logistics journals
