= Progress in Lipid Research =

- Discipline: Lipid biology
- Language: English
- Edited by: Makoto Arita, Kent Chapman, John Harwood, Gabor Tigyi, Markus Wenk

Publication details
- History: 1973-present
- Publisher: Elsevier
- Frequency: Quarterly
- Impact factor: 14.673 (2021)

Standard abbreviations
- ISO 4: Prog. Lipid Res.

Indexing
- CODEN: PLIRDW
- ISSN: 0163-7827
- LCCN: 79641904
- OCLC no.: 224522047

Links
- Journal homepage; Online archive

Progress in Lipid Research is a quarterly peer-reviewed scientific journal that covers research on all aspects of research on lipids. The journal was established in 1973 with Ralph Holman (University of Minnesota) as founding editor-in-chief and is published by Elsevier. The current editors-in-chief are Makoto Arita (RIKEN), Kent Chapman (University of North Texas), John Harwood (Cardiff University), Gabor Tigyi (University of Tennessee Health Science Center), Markus Wenk (National University of Singapore).

== Abstracting and indexing ==
The journal is abstracted and indexed in Chemical Abstract Service, Science Citation Index Expanded, and Scopus. According to the Journal Citation Reports, the journal has a 2021 impact factor of 14.673.
