= International Journal of Developmental Neuroscience =

- Discipline: Developmental neuroscience
- Language: English
- Edited by: Stefano Stifani

Publication details
- History: 1983-present
- Publisher: Wiley
- Frequency: 8/year
- Impact factor: 2.457 (2020)

Standard abbreviations
- ISO 4: Int. J. Dev. Neurosci.

Indexing
- CODEN: IJDND6
- ISSN: 0736-5748 (print); 1873-474X (web)
- OCLC no.: 09161012

Links
- Journal homepage; Online access (pre-2020)

The International Journal of Developmental Neuroscience is the official journal of the International Society for Developmental Neuroscience. It was published up to 2020 by Elsevier when it was transferred to Wiley. It publishes original work in developmental neuroscience.
