= III-Vs Review =

British magazine

III-Vs Review was a magazine published in Northampton, UK. It existed between 1987 and 2007.

== History and profile ==
It was founded in 1987 by XMT Ltd., in Northampton, UK. as Euro III-Vs Review. The founding editor was Roy Szweda, who continues as an associate editor contributing articles, editorials and news. The inspiration for the launch was the U.S. magazine III-Vs Technology Review. It featured articles on advanced semiconductor industry.

III-Vs Review was published nine times a year by Elsevier Science in Oxford until 2007.
