= European Journal of Medicinal Chemistry =

- Discipline: Medicinal chemistry
- Language: English
- Edited by: H. Galons

Publication details
- Former name(s): Chimica Therapeutica
- History: 1966–present
- Publisher: Elsevier
- Frequency: Monthly
- Impact factor: 6.7 (2022)

Standard abbreviations
- ISO 4: Eur. J. Med. Chem.

Indexing
- CODEN: EJMCA5
- ISSN: 0223-5234 (print); 1768-3254 (web)
- OCLC no.: 38945632

Links
- Journal homepage; Online access

The European Journal of Medicinal Chemistry is a monthly peer-reviewed scientific journal covering medicinal chemistry and published by Elsevier. It was established in 1966 as Chimica Therapeutica (CODEN: CHTPBA) and obtained its current title in 1974. From 1974 to 1981 the journal was still subtitled as Chimica Therapeutica and from 1982 to 1986 the subtitle was Chimie Thérapeutique, indicating its French origin. And now it is the journal of the French Société de Chimie Thérapeutique.

The journal covers research on all aspects of medicinal chemistry and publishes original papers, laboratory notes, short or preliminary communications, and invited reviews.

The European Journal of Medicinal Chemistry is abstracted and indexed in the Index medicus and MEDLINE since 2000.
