= Max Planck Institute for Cell Biology =

German research institute

Coordinates: 49°28′12″N 8°38′14″E

The Max Planck Institute for Cell Biology was located in Ladenburg, Germany. It was founded 1947 as Max Planck Institute for Oceanic biology in Wilhelmshaven, after renaming in 1968, it was moved to Ladenburg 1977 under the direction of Hans-Georg Schweiger. It was closed 1 July 2003. It was one of 80 institutes in the Max Planck Society (Max Planck Gesellschaft).
