= Bioorganic & Medicinal Chemistry =

- Discipline: Molecular structure of organisms; drug action
- Language: English

Publication details
- Publisher: Elsevier (U.S.)
- Impact factor: 3.641 (2020)

Standard abbreviations
- ISO 4: Bioorg. Med. Chem.

Indexing
- ISSN: 0968-0896

Links
- Journal homepage

Bioorganic & Medicinal Chemistry is a scientific journal focusing on the results of research on the molecular structure of biological organisms and the interaction of biological targets with chemical agents.

== Publisher ==
It is published by Elsevier, which also publishes the related journal Bioorganic & Medicinal Chemistry Letters.
