= The FEBS Journal =

- Cover of volume 288, issue 22, November 2021
- Discipline: Biochemistry
- Language: English
- Edited by: Seamus Martin

Publication details
- Former names: Biochemische Zeitschrift, European Journal of Biochemistry
- History: 1906–present
- Publisher: John Wiley & Sons on behalf of the Federation of European Biochemical Societies
- Frequency: Biweekly
- Open access: Delayed
- Impact factor: 5.62 (2021)

Standard abbreviations
- ISO 4: FEBS J.

Indexing
- CODEN: FJEOAC
- ISSN: 1742-464X (print); 1742-4658 (web)
- LCCN: 2004243956
- OCLC no.: 57253365

Links
- Journal homepage; Online access; Online arcbhive

The FEBS Journal is a biweekly peer-reviewed scientific journal published by John Wiley & Sons on behalf of the Federation of European Biochemical Societies. It covers research on all aspects of biochemistry, molecular biology, cell biology, and the molecular bases of disease. The editor-in-chief is Seamus Martin (Trinity College Dublin), who took over from Richard Perham (University of Cambridge) in 2014.

Content is available for free 1 year after publication, except review content, which is available immediately. The journal also publishes special and virtual issues focusing on a specific theme.

Since 2021, the journal has given an annual award, "The FEBS Journal Richard Perham Prize", for an outstanding research paper published in the journal. The winners receive a €5,000 cash prize (to be divided equally between the first and last authors) and the senior author of the study is invited to give a talk at the FEBS Annual Congress. The journal also gives more frequent poster prize awards to early-career scientists presenting at conferences.

== History ==
The journal was established in 1906 by Carl Neuberg, who also served as the first editor-in-chief. Its original name was Biochemische Zeitschrift. It was renamed to the European Journal of Biochemistry in 1967, with Claude Liébecq as editor-in-chief, succeeded by Richard Perham, during whose tenure the name became the FEBS Journal, in 2005.

== Notable papers ==
During the early years the Biochemisches Zeitschrift published numerous papers important in the history of biochemistry, including that of Michaelis and Menten.

The two name changes make it difficult to compare all the most notable papers published in the journal, but some are the following:

=== Biochemische Zeitschrift ===
- Michaelis, L.; Menten, M.L. (1913). "Die Kinetik der Invertinwirkung" [The kinetics of invertase action]. Biochemische Zeitschrift. 49 (17): 333–369. (3667 citations)
- Warburg, O.; Christian, W. (1942). "Isolierung und Kristallisation des Gärungsferments Enolase" [Isolation and crystallization of yeast enolase]. Biochem. Z. 310: 384–421. (2188 citations)
- Hagedorn, H.C.; Jensen, B.N. (1923). "On the micro-determination of blood-sugar by means of ferric cyanide". Biochem. Z. 135: 46–58. (1237 citations)

=== European Journal of Biochemistry ===
- Laskey, Ronald A.; Mills, Anthony D. (1975). "Quantitative Film Detection of ^{3}H and ^{14}C in Polyacrylamide Gels by Fluorography". European Journal of Biochemistry. 56 (2): 335–341. doi:10.1111/j.1432-1033.1975.tb02238.x. PMID 1175627. (9207 citations)
- Marklund, S.; Marklund, G. (1974). "Involvement of superoxide anion radical in autoxidation of pyrogallol and a convenient assay for superoxide-dismutase". Eur. J. Biochem. 47 (3): 469–474. doi:10.1111/j.1432-1033.1974.tb03714.x. PMID 4215654. (4971 citations)
- Bonner, William M.; Laskey, Ronald A. (1974). "A Film Detection Method for Tritium-Labelled Proteins and Nucleic Acids in Polyacrylamide Gels". European Journal of Biochemistry. 46 (1): 83–88. doi:10.1111/j.1432-1033.1974.tb03599.x. PMID 4850204. (4925 citations)

=== FEBS Journal ===
- Gialeli, Chrisostomi; Theocharis, Achilleas D.; Karamanos, Nikos K. (2011). "Roles of matrix metalloproteinases in cancer progression and their pharmacological targeting". FEBS Journal. 278 (1): 16–27. doi:10.1111/j.1742-4658.2010.07919.x. PMID 21087457. S2CID 2260074. (964 citations)
- Zelensky, Alex N.; Gready, Jill E. (2005). "The C-type lectin-like domain superfamily". FEBS Journal. 272 (24): 6179–6217. doi:10.1111/j.1742-4658.2005.05031.x. PMID 16336259. S2CID 7084402. (807 citations)
- Yoshida, Hiderou (2007). "ER stress and diseases". FEBS Journal. 274 (3): 630–658. doi:10.1111/j.1742-4658.2007.05639.x. PMID 17288551. S2CID 25715028. (758 citations)

== Abstracting and indexing ==
The journal is abstracted and indexed in:

- Academic Search Elite
- AGRICOLA
- Biological Abstracts
- BIOSIS Previews
- CAB Abstracts databases
- Chemical Abstracts Service
- CSA databases
- Current Contents/Life Sciences
- Embase/Excerpta Medica
- EMBiology
- Food Science & Technology Abstracts
- Index Medicus/MEDLINE/PubMed
- InfoTrac
- International Nuclear Information System
- ProQuest databases
- Science Citation Index
- Scopus
- VINITI Database RAS

According to Journal Citation Reports, the journal has a 2019 impact factor of 4.392.
