= Medicine (Lippincott Williams & Wilkins journal) =

- Discipline: Medicine
- Language: English

Publication details
- History: 1922–present
- Publisher: Wolters Kluwer
- Frequency: Bimonthly
- Impact factor: 1.889 (2020)

Standard abbreviations
- ISO 4: Medicine (Baltimore)

Indexing
- CODEN: MEDIAV
- ISSN: 0025-7974 (print); 1536-5964 (web)
- LCCN: 32003850
- OCLC no.: 807498951

Links
- Journal homepage; Online access; Online archive

Medicine is an open access peer-reviewed medical journal published by Lippincott Williams & Wilkins, an imprint of Wolters Kluwer. It was established in 1922. Of general medical journals still in publication since 1959, Medicine had the highest number of citations per paper between 1959 and 2009. The journal covers all aspects of clinical medicine and publishes in over 43 specialty subjects.

Medicine is now a fully open access mega journal publication, publishing original research across a broad spectrum of medical scientific disciplines and sub–specialties.

== Abstracting and indexing ==
The journal is abstracted and indexed in:

- Index Medicus/MEDLINE/PubMed
- Science Citation Index
- Current Contents/Clinical Medicine
- Current Contents/Life Sciences
- BIOSIS Previews

== 2025 retractions ==
In 2025, a team of Iraqi researchers published a paper in the journal describing an asymptomatic case of Ectopia cordis interna. A private inquiry later indicated that the report had been based on a 2015 hoax. The journal eventually retracted the article, and 5 others articles by the same authors.
