= Regional geochemistry =

Regional geochemistry is the study of the spatial variation in the chemical composition of materials at the surface of the Earth, on a scale of tens to thousands of kilometres. Important parameters to consider when designing or evaluating a geochemical survey are:

- Areal extent of the survey
- Sampling density
- The type of samples collected (soil, stream water, vegetation, bedrock, etc.)
- Post-collection treatment of the samples (e.g. sieving of soil samples into different particle size fractions)
- Methodology of chemical analysis

Garrett et al. (2008) describe how the discipline has evolved from its beginnings in Russia in the 1930s. The first surveys were aimed at mineral exploration. In recent years, many surveys have emphasised a more broad-based environmental mapping approach. Numerous government agencies around the world have initiated multi-year systematic geochemical mapping projects, aimed at producing baseline geochemical maps of very large areas. See, for example, the description by Johnson et al. (2005) of the British Geological Survey's G-BASE project.
