= Sexologies =

- Discipline: Sexology
- Language: English, French
- Edited by: Mireille Bonierbale, Robert Porto

Publication details
- History: 1992-
- Publisher: Elsevier
- Frequency: quarterly

Standard abbreviations
- ISO 4: Sexologies

Indexing
- ISSN: 1158-1360

Links
- Journal homepage

Sexologies, subtitled European Journal of Sexual Health, is a peer-reviewed scientific journal published by Elsevier and is the official journal for the European Federation of Sexology (EFS). Its co-Editors-in-Chief are Mireille Bonierbale and Robert Porto.

Articles in Sexologies contain original, synthetic articles on human sexuality, its dysfunctions and its management. The journal is interdisciplinary in nature, including contributions from anatomy and physiology; psychodynamic, cognitive, behavioural, and relational psychology; epidemiology; sociology; forensics; and the neurochemistry of substances that have sexological effects.

It is indexed in Bibliosex and EMBASE/Excerpta Medica.
