= Seamus Martin (biochemist) =

Irish molecular biologist

Seamus J. Martin is an Irish molecular biologist and immunologist working at The Smurfit Institute of Genetics in Trinity College Dublin. Since 1999, he has held the Smurfit Chair of Medical Genetics at Trinity College Dublin, and his research focuses on the links between cell death, cell stress, and inflammation. Martin is known for his contributions to understanding the molecular control of the mode of regulated cell death known as apoptosis. Martin received the 'GlaxoSmithKline Award' of the Biochemical Society in 2006, the British Science Association's 'Charles Darwin Award' in 2005, and The 'RDS-Irish Times Boyle Medal' in 2014, for his work on deciphering the role of caspases in apoptosis. In 2006, he was elected to the Royal Irish Academy, in 2009 he awarded EMBO Membership, and in 2023 he was elected to the Academia Europaea. His research work is widely cited and he received a European Research Council Advanced Research award in 2021.

Martin is an author of the 11th, 12th, and 13th editions of the award-winning textbook, Essential Immunology, and since 2014, he has served as Editor-in-Chief of The FEBS Journal (Cambridge, UK), an international life sciences academic journal.

== Biography ==
Martin studied biology and chemistry as an undergraduate at The National University of Ireland, Maynooth (NUIM), followed by a PhD in Cell Biology working with Tom Cotter at Maynooth University. After completion of his PhD, he moved to the Dept. of Immunology at University College London (UK) to carry out a post-doctoral fellowship working on HIV immunopathology with internationally known immunologist Ivan Roitt, FRS. Supported by a Wellcome Trust International Prize Fellowship, he then relocated to the La Jolla Institute for Immunology, University of California, San Diego, USA, to undertake a second post-doc with US Immunologist and National Academy Member Douglas R. Green. In 1999 Martin moved to the Dept. of Genetics, Trinity College Dublin, where he was appointed to the Smurfit Chair of Medical Genetics.

== Scientific contributions ==
Martin's research focuses on the molecular mechanisms governing regulated cell death and inflammation. Initially working on the role of proteases in coordinating programmed cell death (apoptosis), he made contributions to our understanding of how caspases become activated during apoptosis, the order of caspase activation events in the intrinsic and extrinsic caspase activation cascades, and how caspases coordinate apoptosis through proteolysis of hundreds of substrate proteins. More recently, his work has focused on how caspases coordinate inflammatory cascades downstream of death receptor engagement. In parallel to his work on caspases, he has also made contributions to our understanding of how neutrophil proteases promote inflammation through processing and activation of members of the extended IL-1 family and has championed the idea that IL-1 family members represent the canonical ‘damage-associated molecular patterns’ that promote inflammation upon release from necrotic cells

While working with Doug Green at La Jolla, Martin pioneered annexin V labeling as a probe for apoptotic cells which has become the ‘gold standard’ for the measurement of apoptosis. He also established a mammalian ‘cell-free’ system for the study of caspase activation pathways in mammals,^{[13][14]} and continued this work upon establishing his own laboratory.^{[15][16][17][18]} Martin's recent work has focused on exploring the links between cell death signals and inflammatory signaling cascades. His laboratory has published a series of studies demonstrating that essentially all initiators of programmed cell death can also promote inflammation^{[19][20][21]} and his current research is focused upon understanding how chemotherapeutic drugs can frequently trigger inflammation that may be detrimental to killing cancer cells.^{[222]}

== Select publications ==
- Martin, S. J., Amarante-Mendes, G. P., Shi, L., Chuang, T.-H., Casiano, C. A., O'Brien, G. A., Fitzgerald, P., Tan, E. M., Bokoch, G. M., Greenberg, A. H., and Green, D. R. (1996) The cytotoxic cell protease granzyme B initiates apoptosis in a cell-free system by proteolytic processing and activation of the ICE/CED-3 family protease, CPP32, via a novel two-step mechanism. EMBO Journal. 15, 2407-2416.
- Slee, E.A., Harte, M.T., Kluck, R.M., Wolf, B.B., Casiano, C.A., Newmeyer, D.D., Wang, H.-G., Reed, J.C., Nicholson, D.W., Alnemri, E.S., Green D.R., and Martin S.J. (1999) Ordering the Cytochrome c-Initiated Caspase Cascade: Hierarchical Activation of Caspases -2, -3, -6, -7, -8 and -10 in a Caspase-9-Dependent Manner. The Journal of Cell Biology 144:281-292.
- Lüthi, A.U., Cullen, S.P., McNeela, E.A., Duriez, P.J., Afonina, I.S., Sheridan, C., Brumatti, G., Taylor, R.C., Kersse, K., Vandenabeele, P., Lavelle, E.C. and Martin SJ (2009) Suppression of IL-33 Bioactivity through Proteolysis by Apoptotic Caspases. Immunity 31:84-98.
- Cullen, SP, Henry CM, Kearney, CJ, Logue SE, Feoktistova M, Tynan GA, Lavelle EC, Leverkus M, and Martin SJ (2013) Fas/CD95-Induced Chemokines can Serve as ‘Find-Me’ Signals for Apoptotic Cells. Molecular Cell, 49, 1034–1048.
- Hollville, E., Carroll, R., and Martin SJ. (2014) Bcl-2 Family Proteins Participate in Mitochondrial Quality Control by Regulating Parkin/PINK1-Dependent Mitophagy. Molecular Cell 55:451-66.
- Henry CM and Martin SJ (2017) Caspase-8 Acts in a Non-enzymatic Role as a Scaffold for Assembly of a Pro-inflammatory "FADDosome" Complex upon TRAIL Stimulation. Molecular Cell, 65, 715-729.
- Sullivan GP, O'Connor H, Henry CM, Davidovich P, Clancy DM, Albert ML, Cullen SP, and Martin SJ. (2020) TRAIL Receptors Serve as Stress-Associated Molecular Patterns to Promote ER-Stress-Induced Inflammation. Developmental Cell 52, 714-730.
- Sullivan GP, Davidovich P, Muñoz-Wolf N, Ward RW, Hernandez Santana YE, Clancy DM, Gorman A, Najda Z, Turk B, Walsh PT, Lavelle EC, and Martin SJ. (2022) Myeloid cell-derived proteases produce a pro-inflammatory form of IL-37 that signals via IL-36 receptor engagement. Science Immunology 7, eade5728 1-15.
