= Journal of Transportation Engineering =

- Language: English

Publication details
- Former names: Journal of the Highway Division; Transportation Engineering Journal of ASCE
- Publisher: American Society of Civil Engineers

Standard abbreviations
- ISO 4: J. Transp. Eng.

Indexing
- ISSN: 0733-947X (print); 1943-5436 (web)

Journal of Transportation Engineering was a journal published by the American Society of Civil Engineers. Prior to 1968, it was known as Journal of the Highway Division, and from 1968 to 1982 it was known as the Transportation Engineering Journal of ASCE, taking the current name in 1983. In 2017 it split into

- Journal of Transportation Engineering, Part A: Systems
- Journal of Transportation Engineering, Part B: Pavements
