= Process Biochemistry =

- Discipline: Biochemistry
- Language: English
- Edited by: Joseph Boudrant

Publication details
- History: 1966-present
- Publisher: Elsevier
- Frequency: Monthly
- Impact factor: 4.885 (2021)

Standard abbreviations
- ISO 4: Process Biochem.

Indexing
- CODEN: PBCHE5
- ISSN: 1359-5113 (print); 1873-3298 (web)
- LCCN: 11442889
- OCLC no.: 781521978

Links
- Journal homepage; Online archive

Process Biochemistry is a monthly peer-reviewed scientific journal that covers the study of biochemical processes and their applications in industries, such as food, pharmaceuticals, and biotechnology. The journal was established in 1966 and is published by Elsevier. The editor-in-chief is Joseph Boudrant (University of Lorraine). The journal covers a wide range of topics related to biochemical processes, including enzyme and microbial technology, protein engineering, metabolic engineering, biotransformations, and bioseparations. The journal publishes research articles, review articles, and case studies.

== Abstracting and indexing ==
The journal is abstracted and indexed in the Science Citation Index Expanded and Scopus. According to the Journal Citation Reports, the journal has a 2021 impact factor of 4.885.
