= American Journal of Emergency Medicine =

- Discipline: Emergency medicine
- Language: English
- Edited by: William J. Brady

Publication details
- History: 1983–present
- Publisher: Elsevier (United States)
- Frequency: 9/year
- Impact factor: 2.9 (2026)

Standard abbreviations
- ISO 4: Am. J. Emerg. Med.

Indexing
- CODEN: AJEMEN
- ISSN: 0735-6757 (print); 1532-8171 (web)
- OCLC no.: 08996781

Links
- Journal homepage; Online access

The American Journal of Emergency Medicine, the oldest (1983) independent peer-reviewed medical journal, covering emergency medicine, is a monthly journal covering all aspects of emergency medicine care. The editor-in-chief is William J. Brady and it is published by Elsevier.
