= Procedia =

Academic journal

Procedia is an open access journal series published by Elsevier.

The purpose of Procedia is to publish, for a fee, "proposed conference proceedings" in a "dedicated online issue". Elsevier advertises this product as having a focus on delivering high quality content and maintains "Peer-review is under the responsibility of the conference organizers."

== Controversy ==
Elsevier formerly published Procedia - Social and Behavioral Sciences in which authors were permitted to directly self-publish. The only requirements for publishing in this journal were to grant Elsevier exclusive publishing rights, to promise the paper would be peer-reviewed at some point in the future and to promise the paper was their own original work and of course, pay the publishing fee.

In 2011, Iranian political prisoner and mystic, Mohammad Ali Taheri, was sentenced to a five-year prison sentence. Among his charges were "interfering in medical science" and "illegitimate use of academic titles". Many of his claims of medical research were published in Procedia - Social and Behavioral Sciences.

In 2017, it was discovered that a fake example reference listed on Elsevier's citation guide had been cited over 400 times in published articles. Over 90% of these citations occurred in Procedia journals.

In 2018, Albania was hit with a scandal in which high-ranking politicians had faked their academic credentials by publishing fraudulent articles in Procedia.

== See also ==
- Energy Procedia
