= Electronic Notes in Theoretical Computer Science =

- Discipline: computer science
- Language: English
- Edited by: Michael W. Mislove

Publication details
- History: 1995-2021
- Publisher: Elsevier (Netherlands)

Standard abbreviations
- ISO 4: Electron. Notes Theor. Comput. Sci.

Indexing
- ISSN: 1571-0661

Links
- Journal homepage; Online access

Electronic Notes in Theoretical Computer Science is an electronic computer science journal published by Elsevier, started in 1995. Its issues include many post-proceedings for workshops, etc. The journal is abstracted and indexed in Scopus and Science Citation Index.

Electronic Notes in Theoretical Computer Science has been discontinued as of 2021.
