= International Journal of Oral and Maxillofacial Surgery =

- Discipline: Oral and maxillofacial surgery
- Language: English
- Edited by: Nabil Samman

Publication details
- Former name: International Journal of Oral Surgery
- History: 1972–present
- Publisher: Elsevier (Netherlands)
- Frequency: Monthly
- Impact factor: 2.789 (2020)

Standard abbreviations
- ISO 4: Int. J. Oral Maxillofac. Surg.

Indexing
- CODEN: IJOSE9
- ISSN: 0901-5027
- LCCN: sv86004992
- OCLC no.: 13320581

Links
- Journal homepage; Online access; Journal page at Elsevier

The International Journal of Oral and Maxillofacial Surgery is a peer-reviewed medical journal covering oral and maxillofacial surgery, oral pathology, and related topics. It is published monthly by Elsevier for the International Association of Oral and Maxillofacial Surgeons.
