= FEBS Letters =

- Cover of the Mirroring the multifaceted roles of RNA and its partners in gene expression Special Issue, FEBS Lett. 592 (17)
- Discipline: Molecular biosciences
- Language: English
- Edited by: Michael Brunner

Publication details
- History: 1968–present
- Publisher: Wiley on behalf of FEBS
- Frequency: 24/year
- Open access: After 12 months/Hybrid
- Impact factor: 4.124 (2020)

Standard abbreviations
- ISO 4: FEBS Lett.

Indexing
- CODEN: FEBLAL
- ISSN: 0014-5793 (print); 1873-3468 (web)
- LCCN: 68006508
- OCLC no.: 1569056

Links
- Journal homepage

FEBS Letters is a not-for-profit peer-reviewed scientific journal published on behalf of the Federation of European Biochemical Societies (FEBS) by Wiley. It covers all aspects of molecular biosciences, including molecular biology and biochemistry. The aim of the journal is to publish primary research in the form of Research Articles, Research Letters, Communications and Hypotheses, as well as secondary research in the form of Review articles. The journal also publishes a News and Views column. The editorial office of FEBS Letters is based in Heidelberg, Germany. The journal income is reinvested in science.

== History ==
The initial idea of FEBS Letters as a journal for rapid communication of short reports in biochemistry, biophysics and molecular biology was proposed by the Secretary General of FEBS, W.J. Whelan, at the 4th FEBS Meeting held in Oslo in 1967. After further discussions and preparations, the first issue of FEBS Letters appeared in July 1968 with Satya Prakash Datta acting as Managing Editor. The initial editorial policy urged the authors to submit their manuscripts directly to a member of the editorial board, who independently evaluated them and, if needed, consulted external referees. Apart from original research articles, early on FEBS Letters started publishing short reviews, hypotheses, discussion articles and meeting reports, as well as a number of supplements to regular issues extensively covering topical subjects. In 2000 the handling of manuscripts was centralized and the editorial process amended and standardized.

Satya Prakash Datta, who served as Managing Editor until 1985, was succeeded by Giorgio Semenza (1986-2000) and Matti Saraste (2000-2001). Between 2001 and 2021, the Managing Editor was Felix Wieland. The current Editor in Chief is Michael Brunner.

The journal published 144 articles in 1968, and from then on steadily increased its output to reach an all-time high of 1733 published articles in 1999.

== Editorial and publishing concept ==
FEBS Letters staff consists of the Editor in Chief, the Editorial Office and the editorial board. The editorial board is composed of Academic Editors, who are active scientists working in different fields of the molecular biosciences.

In accordance with the Editor in Chief, the staff at the Editorial Office evaluates all submissions based on editorial policy and general scientific criteria. Manuscripts that pass through the pre-screening process are distributed to appropriate Academic Editors. The Academic Editors evaluate the manuscripts, supervise the peer-review process and make final decisions autonomously. The handling time from submission to first decision is on average 2.3 weeks. Manuscripts accepted for publication are processed by Wiley and published online, bundled in 24 issues per year.

FEBS Letters follows a typical scientific society publishing model, where the income generated by the journal is used by FEBS to fund its activities, i.e. FEBS fellowships, advanced courses and workshops, congresses, and travel grants.

=== Special Issues ===
Special Issues are collections of topical Review articles written by distinguished scientists covering the latest developments on specific topics in the molecular biosciences. Special Issue articles are commissioned, but, nevertheless, undergo the usual evaluation procedure exerted by the journal. Every year a Special Issue is directly associated with the FEBS Congress and consists of a compilation of Review articles contributed by speakers presenting their work at the congress.

== Access ==
All accepted articles are published online by Wiley on behalf of FEBS. The FEBS Letters archive is completely digitalized and available back to the first issue in 1968. FEBS Letters follows a subscription-based model with a delayed and hybrid open access policy. All articles are made available to non-subscribers for free after 12 months, with Review articles being available for free immediately.

== FEBS Letters Award ==
Every other year FEBS Letters offers a prize of €10,000 to the senior author of an outstanding Research Letter published in FEBS Letters during the previous two calendar years. The winning article is selected in an unbiased fashion by a special Award Committee formed by appointed members of the editorial board plus one external member. The awardee is invited to give a plenary lecture at the FEBS Congress, where she/he is presented with the award. The award has been presented regularly since 2003.

=== Winners ===
Year	Name	Affiliation
2020	Tim Bartels	UK Dementia Research Institute at UCL, United Kingdom
2018	David Stuart	University of Oxford, United Kingdom
2016	Kim Nasmyth; Jan Löwe	University of Oxford, United Kingdom; MRC Laboratory of Molecular Biology, Cambridge, United Kingdom
2014	Susanna Törnroth-Horsefield	Lund University, Sweden
2013	Susumu Mitsutake	Hokkaido University, Sapporo, Japan
2012	Megumi Funakoshi-Tago	Keio University, Tokyo, Japan
2011	Shiro Suetsugu	University of Tokyo, Japan
2010	Hideo Iwai	University of Helsinki, Finland
2009	Frank Sargent	University of Dundee, United Kingdom
2008	Kaspar Locher	ETH Zurich, Switzerland
2007	Noboru Mizushima	Tokyo Medical and Dental University Graduate School, Japan
2006	Theresia Stradal	GBF, Braunschweig, Germany
2005	Elke Deuerling	ZBMH, Heidelberg, Germany
2004	Jie-Oh Lee	KAIST, Daejon, South Korea
2003	Kun Ping Lu	Harvard Medical School, Boston, United States

== Abstracting and indexing ==
The journal is indexed in:

- BIOBASE
- Biological Abstracts
- BIOSIS Previews
- Current Contents
- EMBASE/Excerpta Medica
- Genetics Abstracts
- MEDLINE
- Neuroscience Citation Index
- Science Citation Index
- Scopus
