= Molecular Oncology (journal) =

- Discipline: Molecular oncology
- Language: English
- Edited by: Kevin Ryan

Publication details
- History: 2007-present
- Publisher: Wiley on behalf of the Federation of European Biochemical Societies
- Frequency: Monthly
- Open access: Yes
- License: CC BY
- Impact factor: 6.6 (2022)

Standard abbreviations
- ISO 4: Mol. Oncol.

Indexing
- CODEN: MOONC3
- ISSN: 1574-7891 (print); 1878-0261 (web)
- OCLC no.: 231822388

Links
- Journal homepage; Online access; Online archive

Molecular Oncology is a monthly peer-reviewed open-access medical journal covering research in molecular oncology. It is published by Wiley on behalf of the Federation of European Biochemical Societies. The journal regularly publishes thematic issues with review articles focusing on specific topics of basic, translational, or clinical cancer research. According to the Journal Citation Reports, the journal has a 2022 impact factor of 6.6
