= Mutation Research (journal) =

- Discipline: genetics, biochemistry
- Language: English, French, German
- Edited by: R. A. Baan, D. M. DeMarini, L. R. Ferguson, L. H. F. Mullenders, T. Nohmi, M. D. Shelby, P. J. Stambrook, M. D. Waters

Publication details
- History: 1964-present
- Publisher: Elsevier (Netherlands)
- Frequency: 60/year

Standard abbreviations
- ISO 4: Mutat. Res.

Indexing
- Mutation Research
- CODEN: MUREAV
- ISSN: 1383-5718
- LCCN: QH431
- OCLC no.: 20379572
- Fundamental and Molecular Mechanisms of Mutagenesis
- ISSN: 0027-5107
- Genetic Toxicology and Environmental Mutagenesis
- ISSN: 1383-5718
- Reviews in Mutation Research
- ISSN: 1383-5742

Links
- Journal homepage

Mutation Research is a peer-reviewed scientific journal that publishes research papers in the area of mutation research which focus on fundamental mechanisms underlying the phenotypic and genotypic expression of genetic damage. There are currently three sections:

- Mutation Research/Fundamental and Molecular Mechanisms of Mutagenesis
  (ISSN 0027-5107, impact factor 2020: 2.433)
- Mutation Research/Genetic Toxicology and Environmental Mutagenesis
  (ISSN 1383-5718, impact factor 2020: 2.873)
- Mutation Research/Reviews in Mutation Research
  (ISSN 1383-5742, impact factor 2020: 5.657)

Two previous sections

- Mutation Research/DNA Repair Reports (ISSN 0167-8817)
- Mutation Research/DNA Repair (ISSN 0921-8777)

are now continued as DNA Repair.
