= Transportation Journal =

- Discipline: Transportation, logistics
- Language: English
- Edited by: Evelyn Thomchick

Publication details
- History: 1961-present
- Publisher: Penn State University Press (United States)
- Frequency: Quarterly

Standard abbreviations
- ISO 4: Transp. J.

Indexing
- ISSN: 0041-1612 (print); 2157-328X (web)
- JSTOR: 00411612
- OCLC no.: 1588960

Links
- Journal homepage

Transportation Journal is an academic journal devoted to transportation, logistics and related fields. The journal is published quarterly by the Penn State University Press on behalf of the American Society of Transportation and Logistics.
