= Performance Evaluation =

- Discipline: Computer science
- Language: English
- Edited by: Giuliano Casale

Publication details
- History: 1981–present
- Publisher: Elsevier
- Frequency: Quarterly
- Open access: Hybrid
- Impact factor: 1.0 (2023)

Standard abbreviations
- ISO 4: Perform. Eval.

Indexing
- ISSN: 0166-5316 (print); 1872-745X (web)
- OCLC no.: 858343621

Links
- Journal homepage; Online archive

Performance Evaluation is a quarterly peer-reviewed scientific journal covering modeling, measurement, and evaluation of performance aspects of computing and communications systems. The editor-in-chief is Giuliano Casale (Imperial College London). The journal was established in 1981 and is published by Elsevier.

== Editors-in-chief ==
The following persons are or have been editor-in-chief:

- 1981–1986: Hisashi Kobayashi
- 1987–1990: Martin Reiser
- 1991–2007: Werner Bux
- 2008–2017: Philippe Nain
- 2018-2022: Benny van Houdt
- 2023-present: Giuliano Casale (Imperial College London)

== Abstracting and indexing ==
The journal is abstracted and indexed in:

- Current Contents/Engineering, Computing & Technology
- EBSCO Databases
- Ei Compendex
- Inspec
- Science Citation Index Expanded
- Scopus
- zbMATH Open (1981–2003)

According to the Journal Citation Reports, the journal has a 2023 impact factor of 1.0.
