= Peptides (journal) =

- Discipline: Peptides
- Language: English
- Edited by: Karl-Heinz Herzig

Publication details
- History: 1980–present
- Publisher: Elsevier
- Frequency: Monthly
- Impact factor: 3.867 (2021)

Standard abbreviations
- ISO 4: Peptides

Indexing
- CODEN: PPTDD5
- ISSN: 0196-9781
- LCCN: 80644016
- OCLC no.: 5926089

Links
- Journal homepage; Online access

Peptides is a monthly peer-reviewed scientific journal covering the biochemistry, neurochemistry, pharmacology, and biological functions of peptides. It was established in 1980 and is published by Elsevier. The editor-in-chief is Karl-Heinz Herzig (University of Oulu).

== Abstracting and indexing ==
The journal is abstracted and indexed in:

- BIOSIS Previews
- Chemical Abstracts Service
- Current Contents/Life Sciences
- EMBASE
- EMBiology
- Elsevier BIOBASE
- Index Medicus/MEDLINEPubMed
- Science Citation Index
- Scopus

According to the Journal Citation Reports, the journal has a 2020 impact factor of 3.75.

== Notable articles ==
According to Scopus, the following are the top three cited articles published in this journal:

- Pan, W; Tu, H; Kastin, A (2006). "Differential BBB interactions of three ingestive peptides: Obestatin, ghrelin, and adiponectin". Peptides. 27 (4): 911–6. doi:10.1016/j.peptides.2005.12.014. PMID 16476508.
- Steckelings, U; Kaschina, E; Unger, T (2005). "The AT2 receptor—A matter of love and hate". Peptides. 26 (8): 1401–9. doi:10.1016/j.peptides.2005.03.010. PMID 16042980.
- Naleid, A; Grace, M; Cummings, D; Levine, A (2005). "Ghrelin induces feeding in the mesolimbic reward pathway between the ventral tegmental area and the nucleus accumbens". Peptides. 26 (11): 2274–9. doi:10.1016/j.peptides.2005.04.025. PMID 16137788.
