= Bioorganic & Medicinal Chemistry Letters =

- Discipline: Molecular structure of organisms; drug action
- Language: English

Publication details
- Publisher: Elsevier (U.S.A)
- Impact factor: 2.823 (2020)

Standard abbreviations
- ISO 4: Bioorg. Med. Chem. Lett.

Indexing
- ISSN: 0960-894X

Links
- Journal homepage

Bioorganic & Medicinal Chemistry Letters is a scientific journal focusing on the results of research on the molecular structure of biological organisms and the interaction of biological targets with chemical agents. It is published by Elsevier, which also publishes Bioorganic & Medicinal Chemistry for longer works.
