= European Journal of Cell Biology =

- Discipline: Cell biology
- Language: English
- Edited by: Miguel Vicente-Manzanares, Klemens Rottner

Publication details
- Former name: Cytobiologie
- History: 1969-present
- Publisher: Urban & Fischer Verlag
- Frequency: Monthly
- Impact factor: 6.6 (2022)

Standard abbreviations
- ISO 4: Eur. J. Cell Biol.

Indexing
- CODEN: EJCBDN
- ISSN: 0171-9335
- LCCN: 79649139
- OCLC no.: 5045176
- Cytobiologie
- ISSN: 0070-2463

Links
- Journal homepage; Online access

European Journal of Cell Biology is a monthly peer-reviewed scientific journal that was established in 1969 as Cytobiologie. It is published by Elsevier. Since March 2021, the editor in chief is Dr. Miguel Vicente-Manzanares (IBMCC, CSIC, Salamanca, Spain) and the Deputy Editor is Dr. rer. nat. Klemens Rottner (Zoological Institute Technische Universität Braunschweig). The current editorial team took over from the editorial team of Stefan Linder (University Medical Center Hamburg-Eppendorf), Manfred Schliwa (LMU Munich), and Sabine Werner (ETH Zurich). The journal covers research on cell biology. Publishing formats include original research articles, reviews, and short communications. Its current impact factor is 6.6.

== Abstracting and indexing ==
European Journal of Cell Biology is abstracted and indexed in:

- Animal Breeding Abstracts
- BIOSIS Previews
- Biological Abstracts
- Chemical Abstracts
- Current Advances in Ecological Sciences
- Current Contents
- Dairy Science Abstracts
- EMBASE
- Helminthological Abstracts
- INIS Atomindex
- Index to Dental Literature
- Index to Scientific Reviews
- MEDLINE
- Mir@bel
- Protozoological Abstracts
- Science Citation Index
- Scopus
