= Transportation Research Part D =

Scientific journal

Transportation Research Part D: Transport and Environment
- Discipline: Transportation, Policy, Environmental science
- Language: English
- Edited by: Ying-En(Ethan) Ge, Jane Lin

Publication details
- History: 1996-present
- Publisher: Elsevier
- Frequency: Bimonthly
- Open access: Hybrid
- Impact factor: 4.051 (2018)

Standard abbreviations
- ISO 4: Transp. Res. D

Indexing
- ISSN: 1361-9209

Links
- Journal homepage; ScienceDirect

Transportation Research Part D: Transport and Environment is a peer-reviewed, international scientific journal which publishes work relating to land, sea, and air transportation systems and their impact on environmental systems. It was established in 1996 and is published by Elsevier. The editors-in-chief are Ying-En(Ethan) Ge (Chang'an University) and Jane Lin (University of Illinois Chicago).

== See also ==
- Transportation Research Part A: Policy and Practice
- Transportation Research Part E: Logistics and Transportation Review
- List of transportation and logistics journals
