= Fitoterapia =

- Discipline: Phytotherapy, pharmacology
- Language: English
- Edited by: Orazio Taglialatela-Scafati

Publication details
- Former name: Estratti Fluidi Titolati
- History: 1930–present
- Publisher: Elsevier
- Frequency: 8/year
- Impact factor: 3.4 (2022)

Standard abbreviations
- ISO 4: Fitoterapia

Indexing
- CODEN: FTRPAE
- ISSN: 0367-326X (print); 1873-6971 (web)
- LCCN: sn86008958

Links
- Journal homepage; Online access

Fitoterapia is a peer-reviewed medical journal covering research on the use of medicinal plants and bioactive natural products of plant origin in pharmacotherapy.

According to the Journal Citation Reports, Fitoterapia has a 2022 impact factor of 3.4. Since 2023 the Editor in Chief is prof. Orazio Taglialatela-Scafati.
