= Transportation Research Part A =

Transportation Research Part A: Policy and Practice
- Discipline: Transportation
- Language: English
- Edited by: Juan de Dios Ortuzar, Elisabetta Cherchi

Publication details
- Former name: Transportation Research Part A: General
- History: Since 1979
- Publisher: Elsevier
- Impact factor: 6.8 (2024)

Standard abbreviations
- ISO 4: Transp. Res. A

Indexing
- ISSN: 0965-8564 (print); 1879-2375 (web)
- LCCN: 93646088
- OCLC no.: 67357338

Links
- Journal homepage; Online archive

Transportation Research Part A: Policy and Practice is a bimonthly peer-reviewed scientific journal covering research on transportation policy and related issues. It was established in 1979 as Transportation Research Part A: General, obtaining its current name in 1992. The editors-in-chief are Juan de Dios Ortuzar (Pontificia Universidad Católica de Chile) and E. Cherchi (Newcastle University). According to the Journal Citation Reports, the journal has a 2024 impact factor of 6.8.

== See also ==
- Transportation Research Part D: Transport and Environment
- Transportation Research Part E: Logistics and Transportation Review
- List of transportation and logistics journals
